= History of Aubing =

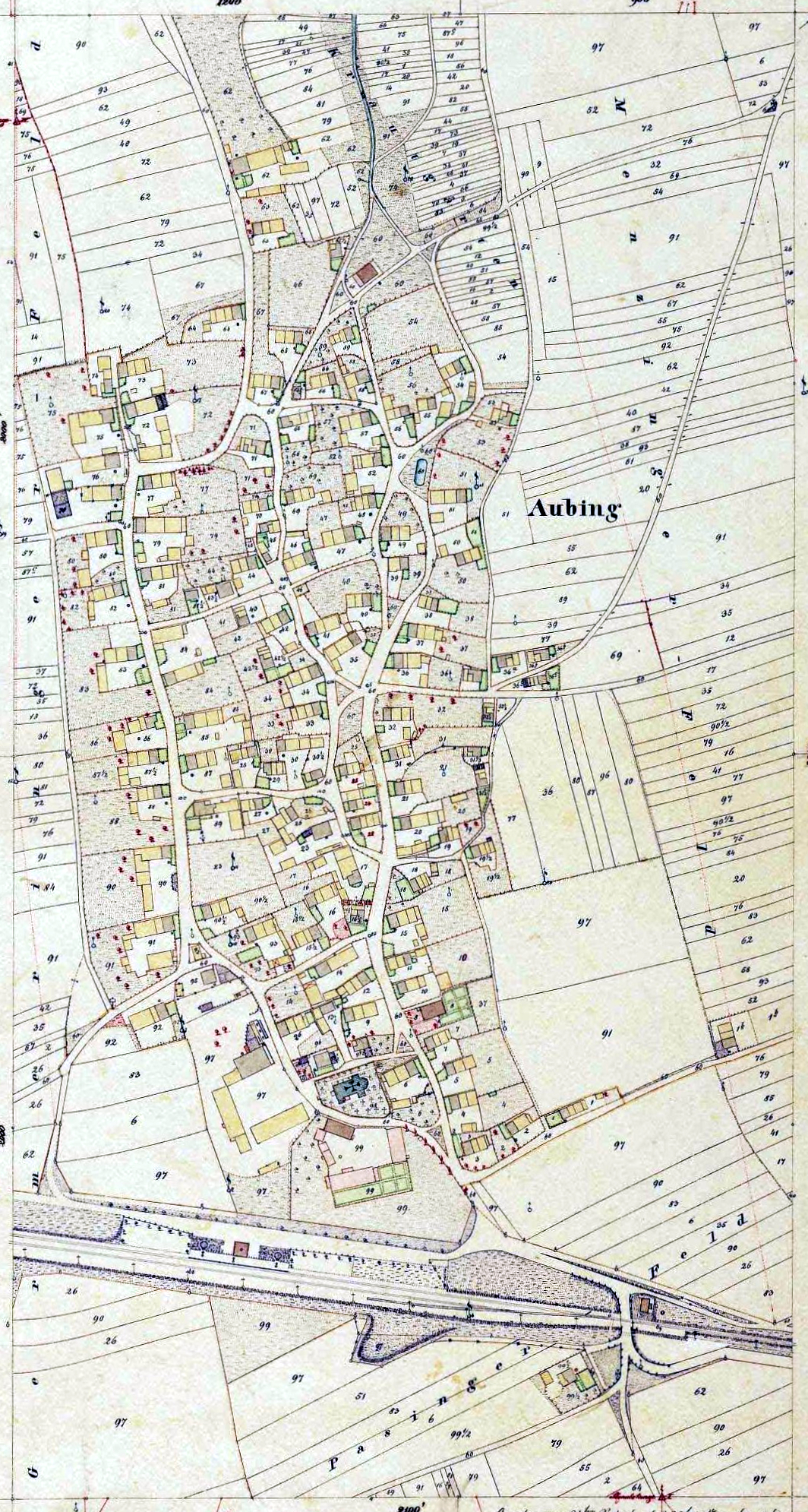
The map of the municipality of Aubing from 1873 depicts the newly constructed railroad line and station to the south.

The written history of Aubing begins with a document from the year 1010, but archaeological traces in the area of today's Munich district of Aubing go back further and suggest a continuous settlement since pre-Roman times. A terraced burial ground from the 5th to 7th century is of supra-regional importance.

In the aforementioned document dated April 16, 1010, King Henry II grants the Polling Abbey the ownership rights to Aubing. However, according to the documents, Aubing probably remained part of the Bavarian ducal estate, as Ludwig the Bavarian donated Aubing to Ettal Abbey in 1330 as part of the founding endowment. The Ettal rule lasted for almost 500 years until the process of secularization in Bavaria. When the independent municipality was formed in 1818, the former Hofmark Freiham was assigned to Aubing for the first time. The railroad connection in the second half of the 19th century marked the start of a period of strong population growth, which is continuing. Since the beginning of the 20th century, new districts have been established, including Neuaubing, Aubing-Ost, Am Westkreuz, and Freiham in the 21st century.

For centuries, Aubing was the most populous village west of Munich. The parish of Aubing included the neighboring villages to the east, from Allach to Laim. In neighboring Pasing, however, the population grew even faster after the construction of the railroad, so that it surpassed Aubing at the end of the 19th century. In 1942, Aubing was incorporated into Munich and constituted a borough in its own right until it was absorbed into the borough of Aubing-Lochhausen-Langwied in 1992.

== Archaeological finds ==
The earliest evidence of human habitation in the Aubing Gemarkung was discovered in 1995/1996, situated to the south of Bodenseestraße (Bundesstraße 2) within the Freiham development area. The single-body burial uncovered at that time, dating to the late Neolithic period, included grave goods such as Corded Ware vessels, which were dated to a period between approximately 2900 and 2300 BC. Additionally, approximately 40 house foundations could be reconstructed based on postholes, including some from the Early Bronze Age. Subsequently, burial finds of the early Urnfield Culture were discovered, as they also came to light in the wider area, for example in 2005 in a well under the Aubinger Weg in the form of a clay temple. The archaeological findings indicate a cessation in the settlement history for the subsequent centuries, which only resumes in the Moosschwaige region west of Neuaubing with burial finds from the considerably younger Hallstatt period. In 2009, a pre-Roman foundation and three additional, presumably Roman building remains were discovered to the north of Bodenseestraße. The discovery of further Roman artifacts and the remains of the Bronze Age and later Iron Age in the local area indicates that the Aubing area was continuously inhabited from an early period.

In 2010, findings from the Corded Ware period were also unearthed to the north of Bodenseestraße, east of Freihamer Weg, during pre-construction investigations conducted by the State Office for the Preservation of Monuments. A stool burial of an adult male in a supine position with bent arms and legs was discovered in a circular ditch measuring six and a half meters in diameter. The grave goods included an axe made of amphibolite, an axe made of gneiss, a dagger made of flint, and the remains of a ceramic vessel.

The origins of the village of Aubing can be traced back to the 5th century AD. Approximately one-kilometer northeast of the town center, on the current edge of the development north of Bergsonstraße, there was a grave field from the 5th to 7th centuries with 862 graves in which 881 individuals were interred. The site was discovered and partially excavated in 1938 but was subsequently removed during subsequent archaeological investigations between 1961 and 1963. The excavated objects are now in the Bavarian State Archaeological Collection. The cemetery is of historical significance because it is one of the largest in Bavaria from the period of upheaval between the end of Roman rule and the first recorded mentions of the Baiuvarii. The numerous grave goods, which can be dated to approximately 40 years ago, provide a highly detailed insight into the way of life at the time. These include two bronze finger rings with Christian symbols, the oldest evidence of Christianity in the diocese of Munich-Freising, which occurred 200 years before the time of St. Corbinian. In women's graves, the most frequently found objects are colorful glass beads from necklaces or robe decorations. In the case of wealthy women, these graves also include brooches. Men's graves from the 6th century AD included swords and other weapons. From the middle of the 7th century, the number of grave goods decreased significantly. The number of burials suggests that the cemetery was used by several farms. These structures were likely situated in the vicinity of the present-day village center, in proximity to the church of St. Quirin. However, the buildings were constructed from wood and other perishable materials, and thus no traces have survived in Aubing.

Early medieval grave goods from Aubing

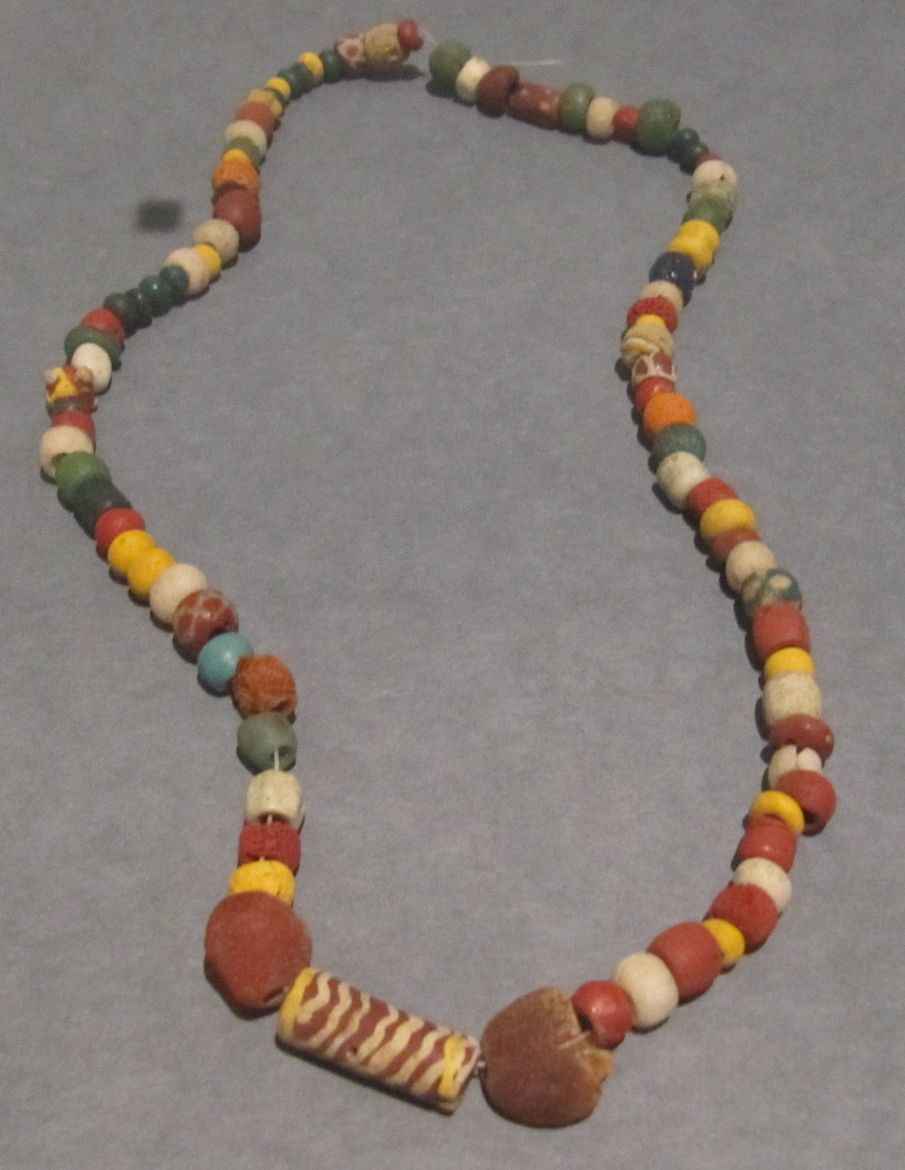
Glass and amber beads

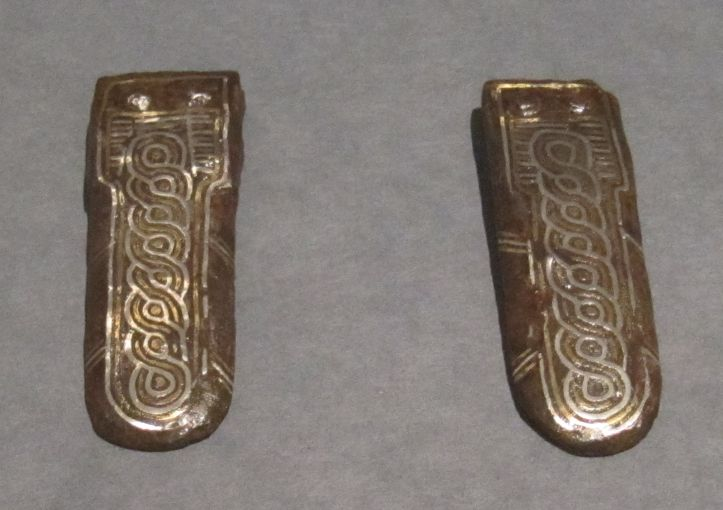
Belt ends with silver and brass inlays

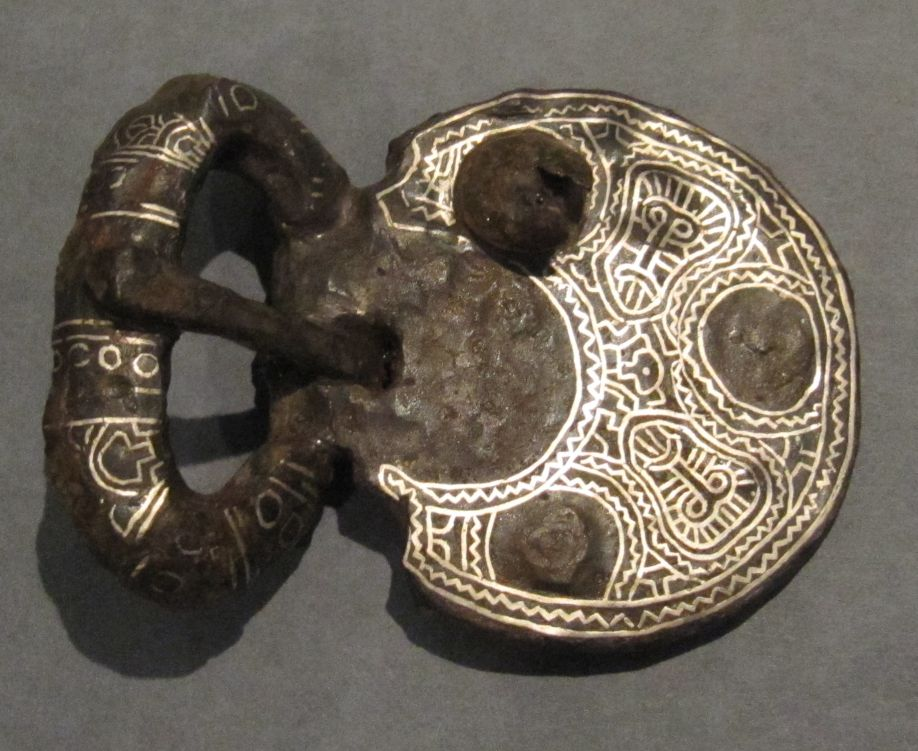
Belt buckle with faces, iron with silver inlay

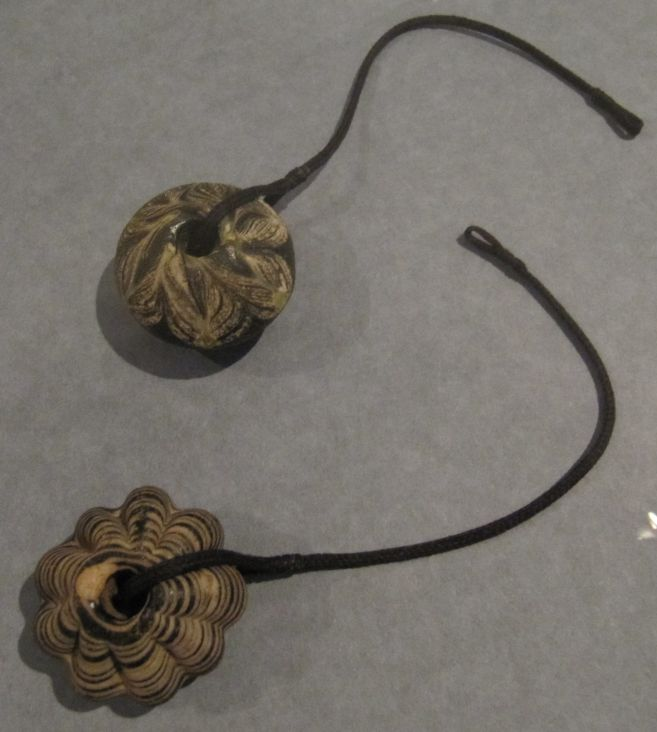
Pendants

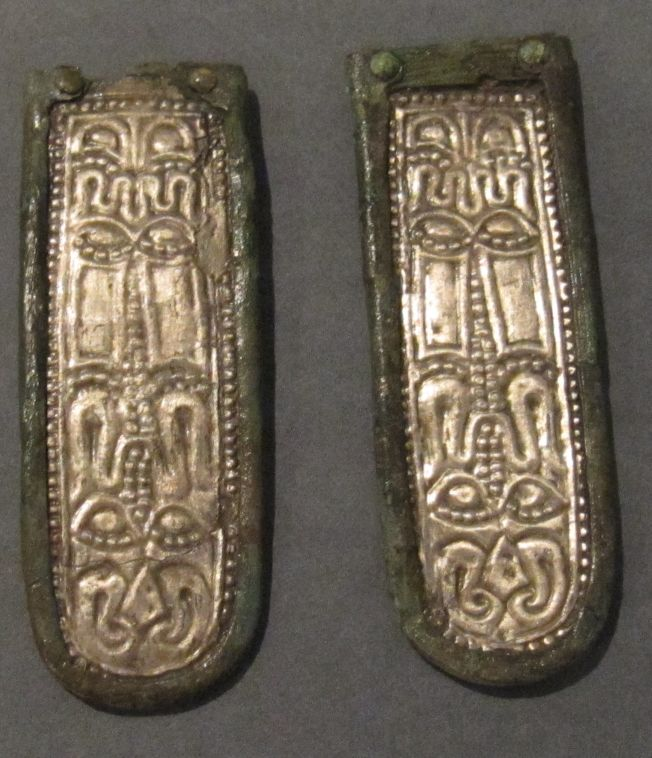
Strap ends, silver and bronze, decorated with pressed sheet metal

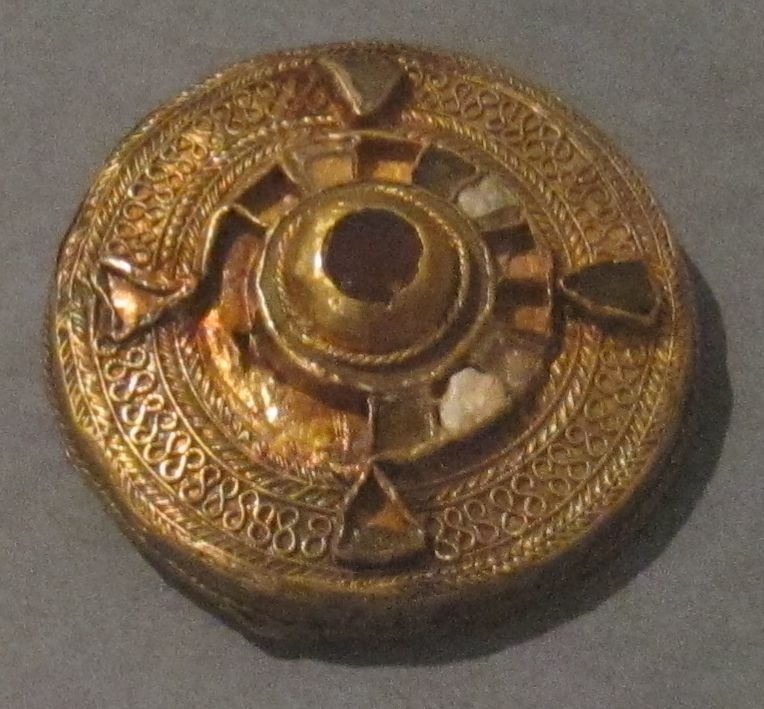
Golden robe clasp

A motte-and-bailey castle in the Aubinger Lohe, the foundations of which have been partially preserved, was probably built in the 10th/11th century and abandoned in the 14th century. The current name "Teufelsburg" (Devil's Castle) is not historically documented for the period of use, and its origin is unclear. In addition to the obvious possibility of the devil, a derivation from "Tuifel" (depression, pond) is also a possible interpretation, as a reference to the damp area of the Dachauer Moos below. It may have served as a refuge for the people of Aubing and to protect the road passing by. In the nineteenth century, the tuff foundations were transferred to a master bricklayer from Aubing, who was remunerated with an annual fee of 45 Kreuzer for their exploitation.

== 1010–1330 ==
=== First documented mention ===
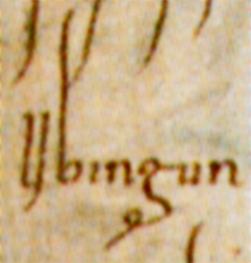
Detail from the document of the first mention of Ubingun. In the first occurrence, the name is abbreviated; a few lines further on, as shown here, it is written out in full.

The oldest surviving documented mention of Ubingun is a deed from King Henry II dated April 16, 1010, which was sealed in the Reich Chancellery in Regensburg. The etymology of the name Ubingun and thus the derived Aubing is uncertain; there is no evidence to support the assumption that it is derived from the Bavarian male name Ubo.

This document indicates that Henry returned to Polling Abbey property in eight villages that, according to the document, "apparently" belonged to the abbey in the past. This may be a reference to an expropriation of the abbey by the former Bavarian Duke Arnulf I to finance his army during the Hungarian invasions. In addition to Aubing, the restitution affected the villages of Polling, Weilheim, Rieden, Landstetten, Aschering and Wangen, all situated to the west and north of Lake Starnberg, as well as a Pfaffenhofen, presumably Oberpfaffenhofen. The Aubing tithe, which was to be paid to the abbey, is also mentioned. The document, measuring 46 cm by 58 cm, is written in Latin and diplomatic minuscule script. It can be found in the Bavarian Main State Archives, with the inventory designation BayHStA Kl. Polling Urk. 1.

The transfer of land in Aubing to Polling Abbey, as described in the document, is open to question as to whether it was more than a declaration of intent. The details are vague, and no reference is made to specific buildings or lists of properties, as was done in comparable cases of retransfer. In 1136, Polling Abbey received confirmation from Pope Innocent II of its claims to Aubing, as evidenced by the document of 1010. This act was interpreted as a warning to the secular ruler to finally fulfill these claims. However, likely, the property that Polling Abbey had been deprived of by Arnulf remained in the treasury of the Duchy of Bavaria. The tithe from Aubing to Polling Abbey is documented in the following centuries. However, the transportation costs to the nearest collection point, the toe box in Aschering, were likely to exceed the value of the goods. Finally, in the 18th century, Polling Abbey sold the rights to the Aubing tithe to a Munich merchant.

By 1500, approximately 200 additional documents had been discovered in which Aubing or Aubinger were mentioned. The earliest known Aubinger was Engilmar(us) de Ubingen. He was a ministerial servant at the Benediktbeuern Abbey and provided testimony regarding a foundation based there, which can be traced between 1062 and 1090. This indicates that Benediktbeuern owned land in Aubing, as Engilmarus would have been obliged to perform this service. Other servants with the name "von Aubing" are documented for the monasteries of Beuern, Neustift, Schäftlarn, and Weihenstephan. Heinrich von Aubing (Heinricus de Ubingen), mentioned between 1155 and 1174, was politically influential as a ministerialis and retainer of Duke Henry the Lion.

=== 1180-1330: Wittelsbach ducal estate ===
In 1180, the year of the transfer of power in the Duchy of Bavaria from the Welf Henry the Lion to the Wittelsbach Otto I, the knight Otto von Aubing (Otto miles de Ubingen) emerged as the first Wittelsbach ministerial. He attested to a donation from "his lord," the Wittelsbach Count Palatine Frederick II, to Polling Abbey. This leads to the conclusion that the ducal possessions in Aubing also fell to the Wittelsbachs along with the duchy. It is not known whether there were other landlords in Aubing besides the duke and the local church, nor whether Ritter Otto was related to earlier von Aubing knights.

To obtain an overview of their estates, the Wittelsbach dukes had their chancellery in Landshut draw up Urbarium, lists of the property and rights of the duchy, which had evidential value, similar to today's land registrations. The first of these Urbarium, produced between 1227 and 1237, provides insight into the state of Aubing at that time. In this document, Aubing is first assigned to the "Ampt ze Dachowe," the later district court of Dachau. Prior to the separation of jurisdiction and administration in the 19th century, the courts were also responsible for administration. Of the 62 "whole farms" belonging to the duchy in this office, 19, or almost a third, were located in Aubing. The next largest villages had only five such farms. Although the Urbar does not mention farms belonging to other landlords, this suggests that Aubing was already an above-average-sized village at the time. The farms were not described in detail, but the annual taxes were recorded precisely. These amounted to 18 pigs, 30 geese, 90 chickens, 1,500 eggs, as well as grain, turnips, and peas for the 19 farms, the amount of which is given in "Mutt des Herzogs," a unit of volume, the size of which is no longer known. It is notable that, in contrast to other villages, no cheese was obtained from Aubing, suggesting that there were not many dairy cattle. Monetary payments were not part of the taxes paid by the farms to the lord of the manor. However, money was required as a tax for a "tree garden" and a mill.

Following the initial division of Bavaria, a second urbarium for the Duchy of Upper Bavaria was compiled between 1269 and 1271. The data on Aubing is largely consistent with that presented in the initial urbarium, although the number of farms has increased to 29. In the third ducal charter from the 1340s, it is only noted that the entire village of Aubing, including the entire manor, now belonged to Ettal Abbey.

There is evidence of other landlords at the same time as the Wittelsbach dukes. In 1314, a "Wiesmahd" from the Altenhohenau Abbey was exchanged for other goods with Dukes Rudolph and Ludwig of Bavaria. According to the registers of 1315, Aubing paid 20 "scaffas" of wheat to the diocese of Freising.

== 1330-1803: Rule of the Ettal Abbey ==
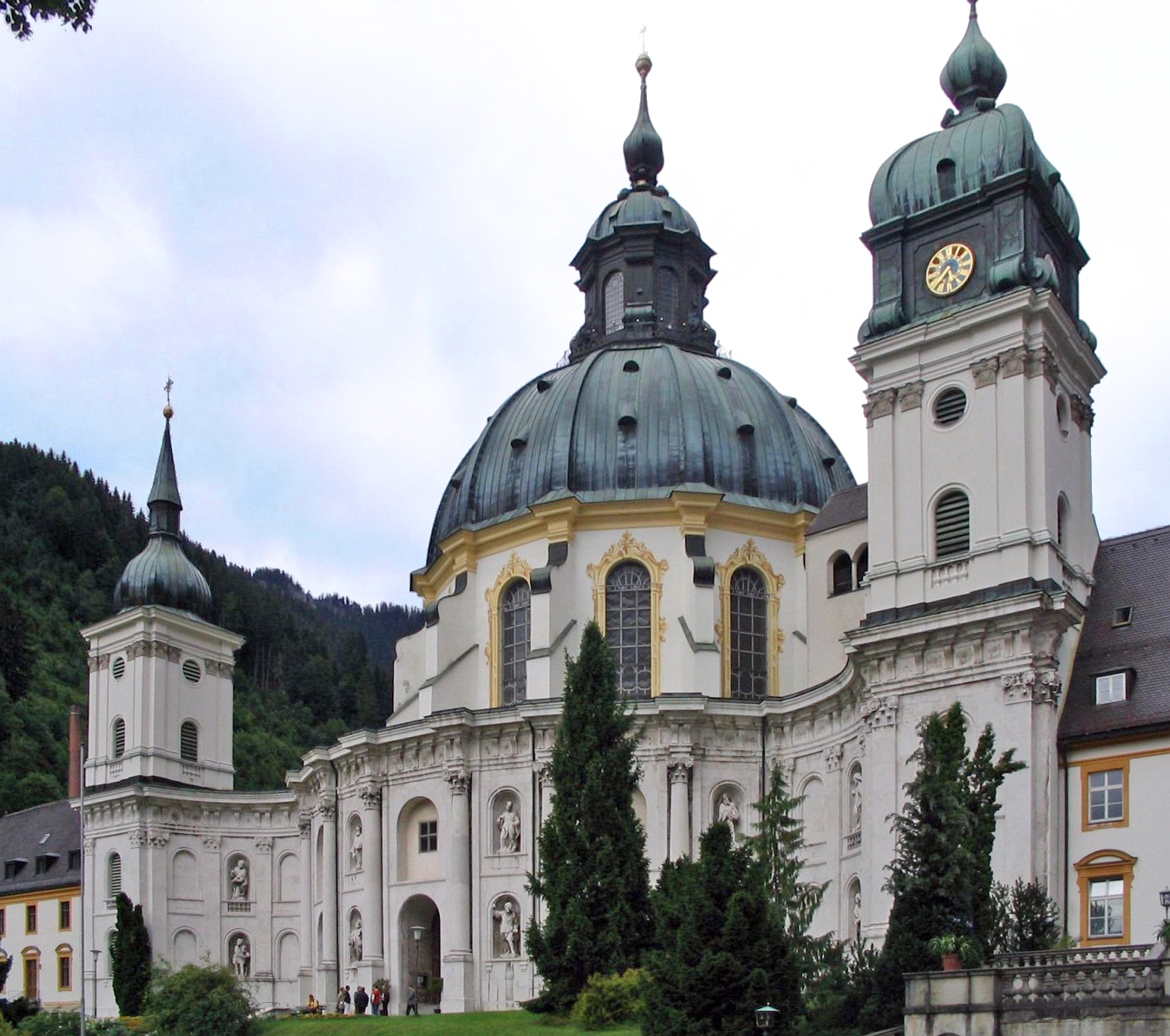
Ettal Abbey

Emperor Ludwig the Bavarian († October 11, 1347) established the Ettal Abbey in 1330. In order to guarantee the abbey's financial stability, the Abbey was endowed with agricultural estates and the associated landowners. The Latin document indicates that this also included "Tota villa in Awbingen cum omnibus suis pertinentiis ...," which translates to the entire village of Aubing with all its appurtenances. Additionally, the document specifies three farms in Lochhausen, two farms and six Huben in Überacker (which is currently a district of Maisach). In the case of "Tota villa," or the entire village, pproximately one-quarter of the Aubing farms were under the ownership of other lords and therefore did not transfer to the Ettal Abbey. For instance, the records of the Heilig-Geist-Spital in Munich indicate that it owned two farms in Aubing in 1390. It retained its ownership of Aubing until 1800. In addition to the aforementioned landowners, the parish of Aubing and various citizens of Munich also held land in the area. These included Orlando di Lasso, the court chapel master of the ducal court, and his heirs, who owned land in Aubing from 1578 to 1617. The tithing rights of Polling Abbey and the religious assignment of the parish of Aubing to the diocese of Freising remained unaffected by the donation to Ettal.

Before the nationalization of the Ettal Abbey in 1803, the Benedictine order exercised authority over the land and law. The majority of the people of Aubing were serfs of the abbey. Its rule was relatively benevolent compared to that of the nobility. For instance, it is unclear whether Ettal expelled its peasants from the house in the event of payment difficulties. The Ettal Hofmark also provided financial support for the Aubing school and teachers' salaries regularly. Pupils are documented in Aubing as early as the 15th century, and the name of the first Ludimagister (schoolmaster) is known from 1649. It can be reasonably assumed that a school was held in the sacristan's house from around 1669, with the Benedictines of Ettal likely playing a role in its establishment. This is evidenced by the fact that the first teachers were in the service of the church as sacristan, organist, or choirmaster. Financial support from Ettal for Aubing is documented for 1770, following a major crop failure.

=== The Bavarian War (1420-1422) ===
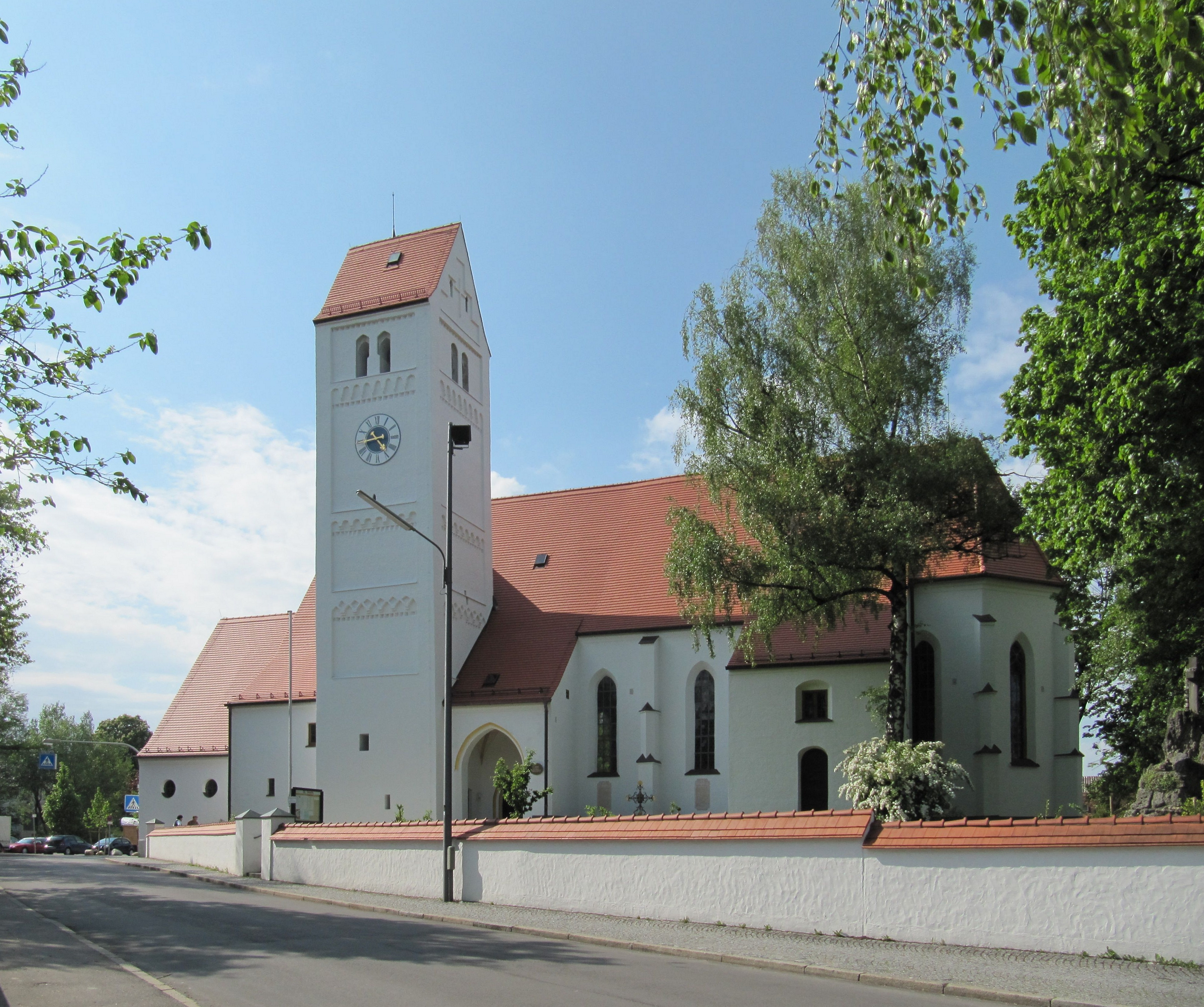
South view of St. Quirin. The Romanesque tower from the 13th century is the only surviving building in Aubing from the time before the Bavarian War.

During the Bavarian War in August 1422, Louis VII, Duke of the Partial Duchy of Bavaria-Ingolstadt, invaded the Partial Duchy of Bavaria-Munich, which was ruled by his cousins Ernest and William III. The residential city of Munich was well equipped for defense, so Ludwig did not attack directly. However, he wanted to disrupt the city's food supply, so he had the villages of Gauting, Germering, Pasing and Aubing burnt down. It is not known how many lives and houses were destroyed in Aubing. What is certain is that the nave of the church burned down, presumably it was made of wood. Only the stone tower (built after 1270), which has survived to this day, remained standing. In the Battle of Alling, two villages away, the Dukes of Munich finally defeated their cousin Ludwig on September 19, 1422. The new nave of St. Quirin's Church was consecrated in 1489.

=== Division of power by Duke Sigismund, 1476 ===
The ducal authority in Aubing had been represented by the Dachau district court since the 13th century. Aubing was on the edge of the district court, the neighboring Freiham and Pasing already belonged to the Starnberg district court. The district court was responsible for public order and high jurisdiction. It also controlled the lower courts, in Aubing before the Ettal period a village court belonging to a nobleman. Owning a court was financially attractive due to the fees levied, but taxes also had to be paid to the duke. There is evidence that the village court was now owned by Ettal in 1440. Elsewhere, namely at the Murnau district court, Ettal was also responsible for high jurisdiction. In Aubing, however, there was a dispute between Ettal and the district court over jurisdiction and the associated fees.

This dispute was settled in 1476 by a decision of Duke Sigismund. Sigismund had retired from government in favor of his younger brother Albert, lived in nearby Blutenburg Castle and was the lord of Dachau. He defined the responsibilities as follows: Ettal was granted lower jurisdiction over all the people of Aubing, including the serfs of other landlords. Aubing thus became a closed Hofmark of Ettal. The district court retained high jurisdiction, i.e. all proceedings that could end with the death penalty. However, confiscated property of these criminals remained with the lower court if they were arrested in the area of the lower court. The district judge and the Dachau officials were not allowed to enter the Hofmark, and the handover point for criminals was precisely defined. The district court retained sovereign duties such as the mustering of the Aubingers for the ducal army; a preserved list from the 16th-century lists 81 Aubingers fit for military service by name. The supervision of weights and measures was a joint task, and the lower court was responsible for imposing related punishments.

Ettal established a common seat of justice for all properties in the Dachau district court area. Although Aubing was the largest of these estates, it was in a peripheral location, so the judge's seat was moved to the more central Maisach. A copy of the Wittelsbach Code was also kept there. An amtmann of the Hofmark lived in Aubing, who took over the police function and also organized official meetings in the inn, for which the judge came to Aubing. However, not all judges made the journey to Aubing, so the people of Aubing had to walk to Maisach, three hours away.

=== Further events of the 15th century ===
In 1433, Aubing briefly became the focus of Bavarian state history when the Aubing parish priest and provosts of St. Ulrich's Church in Laim sold two properties in Untermenzing, near Blutenburg Castle, to the "honorable maiden Agnes Bernauer". The corresponding document is the first evidence of Bernauerin's first name.

Whether the plague claimed as many victims in Aubing in the 15th century as elsewhere is not reported in the known sources. The only mention is found in a diary kept by the Aubing priest Michael Gotzmann, who writes that his father died of the plague in 1483.

=== Village ordinance around 1530 ===
All Aubing farmers were serfs of their respective landlords. The social status and the amount of taxes and duties to be paid depended on the size of the farmed estate. Four village elders were elected as spokesmen for the Gmain, i.e. the community of villagers. Whole farms were the largest farming estates, but there were also half, quarter, and sixth farms. There was also a barber establishment, which offered basic medical care as well as shaves a bath, and a metalsmith. Other professions such as merchants, millers, tailors, or cordwainers are only to be found in Aubing much later or not at all. The inhabitants were therefore largely self-sufficient in this respect.

Living together in the Aubing Gmain was governed by fixed rules. The Ettal court magistrate Ulrich Steger, a lawyer trained at the University of Ingolstadt, recorded these rules in writing in 1530 in a code of conduct. This was therefore not a new introduction, but a description of what was considered binding. These rules contained five sections. The land regulations regulated how the agricultural land and groves belonging to the Gmain, the commons, were to be used and maintained. For example, a full-time farmer was entitled to more meadow cutting than a quarter-farm farmer. Fines were imposed for violations. The second part described the farmers' obligation to keep field fences to prevent game from entering the fields. After collecting the tithe, farmers were allowed to drive their livestock onto the harvested fields. The felling of fruit-bearing trees was forbidden on pain of a fine. The third part regulated which tradesmen were employed by the municipality. These included the barber and the blacksmith. The former received payments from the adult men, and the latter received a fixed amount of natural resources from each farmer each year and did some work for free in return. The fourth part regulated the payment of service providers who only worked in certain seasons. These included the field keeper, the keeper of the communal herd, the herdsman for breeding cattle, and the watchman. The last part regulated the catering of the judge in the tavern. The fines to be paid were to be used for this first. If these were insufficient, the villagers had to help out.

=== The Thirty Years' War (1618-1648) ===
Aubing experienced extensive devastation during the Thirty Years' War. Initially, the war's impact on daily life was minimal, as hostilities primarily occurred in other regions of Germany. In 1629, several individuals from Aubing were confirmed in Dachau by the Prince-Bishop of Freising, Veit Adam von Gepeckh. In May 1632, the army of the Swedish King Gustav II Adolf stood outside Munich. He had promised Munich protection if the city was surrendered without a fight, to which the city agreed. However, the king allowed his soldiers to plunder the surrounding villages in the west on May 17 or 18. There is a report from the parish priest of Lochhausen, north of Aubing, about the loss of money, valuables, livestock, and other items, but he does not mention any fires. There are no eyewitness accounts from Aubing, but a list from the Ettal Abbey from 1637 and a tax book from the Dachau district court from 1670 indicate that at least 19 farms were destroyed by fire. Historians assume the fire affected at least 40 of the 80 existing properties.

The village of Brunham, situated between Lochham and Pasing, was last referenced in connection with the events of 1632. It is likely that the village burned down and was subsequently abandoned. The Brunham road from Aubing to Lochham serves as a reminder of the former village. Between the fall of 1632 and 1634, imperial troops passed through the area on several occasions, and their soldiers were also responsible for stealing food.

In 1646, the Swedish army once again traversed the region. As with the initial incursion, numerous inhabitants of Aubing sought refuge in Munich. The records of the parish of St. Peter indicate that one marriage and ten baptisms were conducted for individuals hailing from Aubing. Some sources suggest that, in contrast to other locales, Aubing experienced less devastation during the second Swedish invasion than during the initial incursion.

The "Leibgeldregister" of the district court of Dachau, a register of households liable to pay taxes, still lists 44 Aubing names in 1640, only half as many as in 1619. In 1649, there are still 30, and in 1657, 41. It is uncertain whether the households that were no longer listed were no longer extant or were omitted due to wartime poverty. A considerable number of the inhabitants of Aubing were no longer mentioned after 1632, and several Aubing family names are no longer traceable after the Thirty Years' War. Ettal directories often state that "the whole farm was burned and everything died." However, new names also appear. In one instance, it is documented that the newcomer hailed from Tyrol. At this time, the landlords of the Aubing farmers were not solely the Ettal Abbey; they also included the Munich parishes of Heilig Geist and St. Peter, as well as some Munich citizens. Following the war, they attempted to enhance agriculture by rebuilding residential and farm buildings. Nevertheless, it was not until several decades later that it was possible to resume farming at the pre-war scale. Consequently, an area to the south of the village, near the current Bodensee road, became overgrown. Until the nineteenth century, there were undeveloped areas in the village, probably caused by burning buildings.

=== Wars of the 18th century ===
The extent of the damage suffered by Aubing during the wars of 1703/04 in the War of the Spanish Succession and 1741–1745 in the War of the Austrian Succession remains unclear. Only lists from the respective Aubing parish priest have survived, in which forced levies, stolen food, animals and objects as well as a burnt down farm, which was liable to the parish priest, are listed. It cannot be assumed that other Aubing residents fared any better. In 1744, marauding soldiers stabbed a 22-year-old man from Aubing who was on his way to Munich in a wagon.

== The Aubing parish from the Middle Ages to the 20th century ==
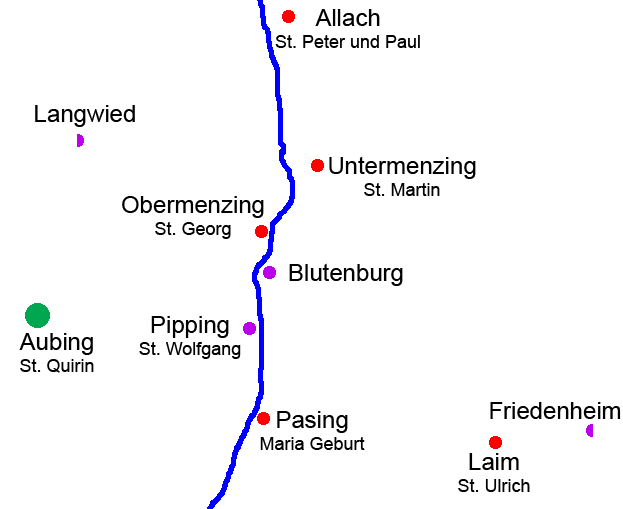
The Aubing parish from the Middle Ages to the 19th century. Branches mentioned in 1315 in red, those mentioned later in purple, the Würm in blue. Langwied and Friedenheim partly belonged to the parish. From St. Quirin to St. Ulrich (Laim) is 6.5 km as the crow flies.

In addition to the Ettal Abbey and the Dachau district court, the parish of St. Quirin in Aubing was the third most influential local authority in the Middle Ages and early modern period. This extensive original parish, which belonged to the diocese of Freising, not only included Aubing itself, but also numerous neighboring villages to the east and north. Five branches were mentioned in the Conradine register of the diocese from 1315: The parish of St. Quirin in Aubing was extensive, encompassing not only the village of Aubing itself but also numerous neighboring villages to the east and north. The Conradine register of the diocese from 1315 lists the following villages as belonging to the parish: Pasing, Allach, two Menzings, Laim with cemeteries. The two Menzings are Obermenzing and Untermenzing. The document also records the amount of grain and money that the parish had to pay to the diocese. Later, the following villages were also recorded as belonging to the parish: Blutenburg and Pipping (St. Wolfgang) with their own churches and parts of Friedenheim and Langwied without a church. In contrast, the southwestern Freiham was part of the northern parish of Lochhausen. In 1438, a benefice was established in Pasing, with a separate priest assigned to the Church of the Nativity of the Virgin Mary. This priest continued to belong to the Aubing parish.

The earliest known parish priest in Aubing was a "Chunrad," who appears as a witness in documents in 1311 and 1330. St. Quirin was a wealthy parish, which brought the priest corresponding benefices. A Dachau district judge described it as the richest benefice in the district court. The vicarage was alternately assigned by the bishop and the duke. Both took advantage of this to provide for favorites. Consequently, the Aubing priests included canons of Freising and court chaplains of the duke. Some of them were represented by local lieutenant priests while they themselves continued to reside at their lord's court, particularly around 1500. For example, Michael Gotzmann served as vicar (deputy) to Stephan Sundersdorfer, a Freising canon, who documented the financial and personal circumstances of the parish in a register from 1524. In 1525, Gotzmann, born in 1480 as a serf in Aubing, became a parish priest himself. It seems probable that he was the uncle of Georg Gotzmann, who was known as Georgius Theander and held the posts of professor of theology and vice-rector of Ingolstadt University. He was also born in Aubing. The name Theander is derived from the Greek word for "God's man."

Theander had studied in Vienna and brought back an early mathematical text from there in 1537, which today belongs to the collection of the Austrian National Library as part of the manuscript CVP 5277. Theander, also known as an exegete, was, among other things, ducal commissioner of a commission of the diocese of Freising, who visited the parish of Aubing during the Counter-Reformation in 1560. The surviving report indicates that the entire parish, including its branches, had 850 "communicants," or individuals who received communion (not first communion). This suggests a total population of over 1,000. In addition to the Aubing priest, there was a chaplain in Menzing and two "Fruemesser," or deacons, in Pasing and Aubing. Wolfgang Gotzmann, who may have been a nephew of Michael Gotzmann, served as the parish priest in Aubing from 1581 to 1616. The family name remains in Aubing today, as evidenced by the street name Gotzmannstraße and the adjacent school.

The Hofmark of the von Berchem family was situated east of Aubing. It expanded until it encompassed all the Aubing branch villages on the Würm. From 1672, they also owned Blutenburg Castle. In 1686, Pastor Prugg recorded the baptism of two Turkish boys in the "Baronial Berchem Castle Chapel" in the baptismal register. The two boys had been brought by "Your Excellency Baron von Berchem during the siege and capture of the fortress of Neuhäusl in Hungary," that is, from the campaign against the Turks. Ali and Osman became Anton and Joseph. In Aubing itself, a Mehmet became Johannes Antonius Turco in the same way in 1690.

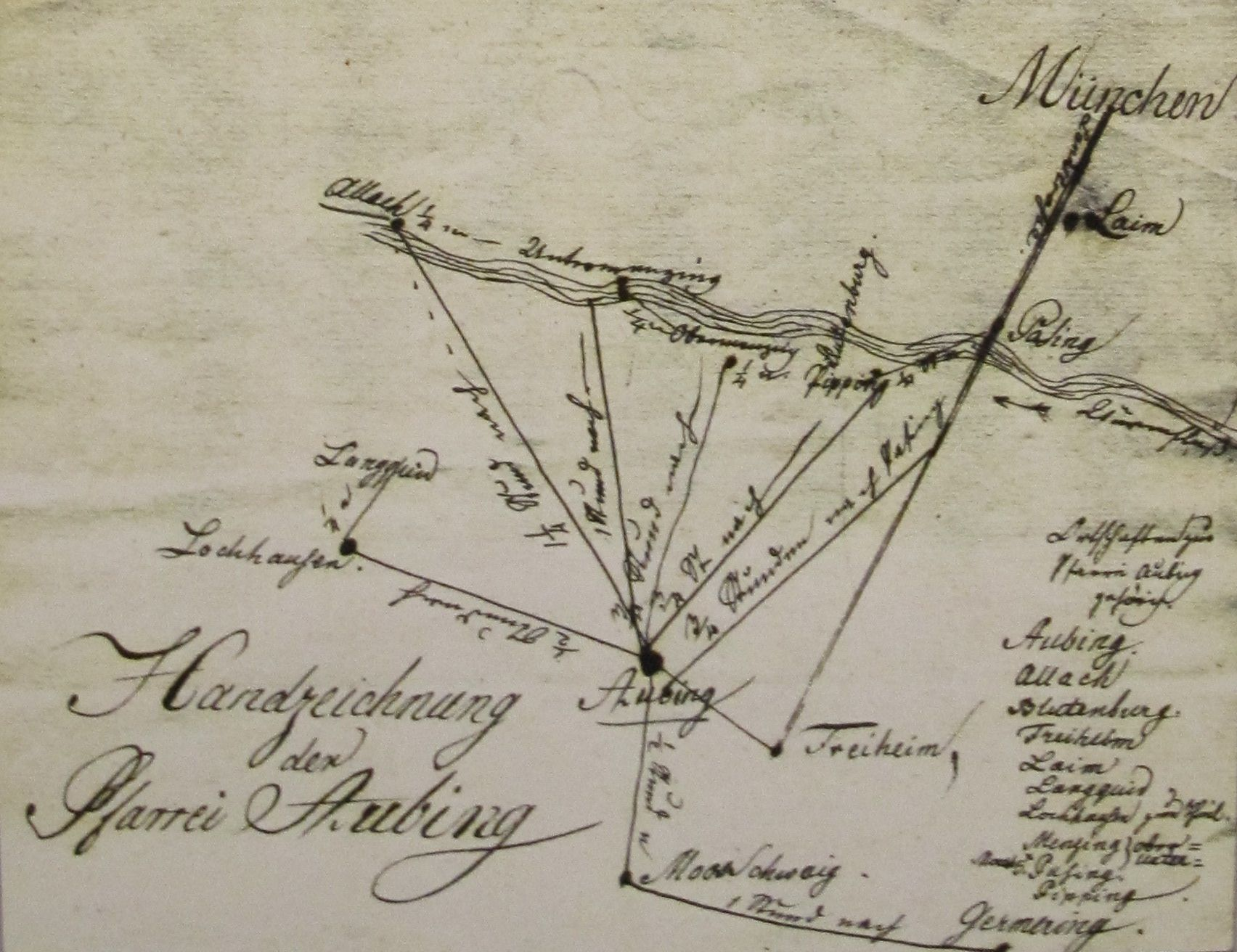
The branch churches of the Aubing parish in 1817, drawing by priest Michael Prumer. North is on the left, the Würm is outlined with wavy lines.

A state "goods conscription" from 1752 lists 106 properties for Aubing, nine of which were owned by the parish. In addition, there was land ownership in the Allach and Obermenzing branches.

In 1817, the parish priest of Aubing, Michael Prumer, observed that the remoteness of the villages necessitated the recruitment of young, sprightly clergymen. In 1914, Josef Steinbacher cites a "Diocesan description of Westermayer" presumably from 1874. At least by 1880, the villages belonging to the Aubing parish were listed in a table according to their size. It was also noted that eight Langwied houses belonged to the Lochhausen parish, while five Friedenheim houses with 50 souls still belonged to the Aubing parish. These affiliations remained stable over the centuries.

The first significant change occurred in 1880, when Pasing became its parish, with the Laim and Obermenzing branches. In 1914, Allach and Untermenzing were still part of the parish of Aubing, served by an expository priest and an assistant priest. Langwied now belonged entirely to Lochhausen, as Freiham had done since the Middle Ages. The wooden church of St. Joachim and Anna in Neuaubing, consecrated in 1921, became its parish in 1922, now known as St. Konrad.

Aubing parish around 1874
	Souls	Houses
Aubing	866	147
Langwied	86	13
Allach	409	72
Laim	222	33
Pasing	1325	158
Pipping	39	8
Obermenzing	263	44
Untermenzing	229	43

== 1803/18-1942: Independent municipality ==
=== Secularization ===
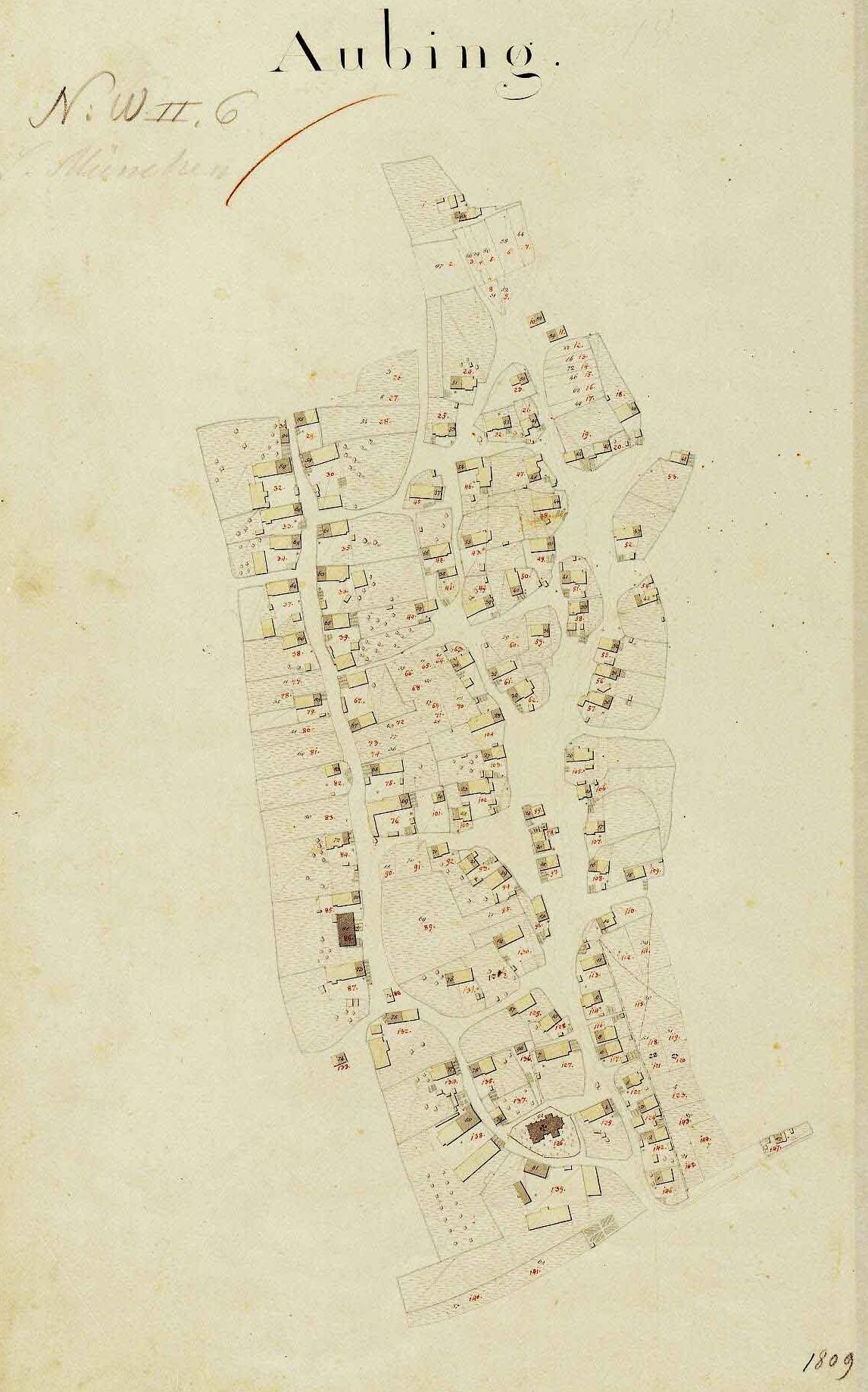
Aubing during the original survey in 1809.

As part of the secularization in Bavaria initiated by Montgelas, the Ettal land and legal rule over Aubing ended in 1803. Aubing was assigned to the area of the new district court of Munich, the forerunner of the district of Munich. 53% of the land in Aubing passed from ecclesiastical or monastic ownership to state ownership. The rest belonged to Munich citizens and the Starnberg rent office. The Ettal forest property in the Aubinger Lohe also became state property. Living conditions in the Gmain, the village community, changed considerably as a result. The tax burden on the farmers, on the other hand, initially remained the same, except that the taxes now had to be paid to the Electorate of Bavaria. The five guilder allowance that the school teacher had previously received from Ettal Abbey was now also paid by the state. State administrators collected the outstanding money and goods that the farmers still owed the abbey. The "Aubingian Underthan riots" chapter was not closed until 1824.

The reforms implemented in the newly established Kingdom of Bavaria resulted in the first comprehensive survey of Bavarian municipalities. The so-called original survey, conducted in 1809, revealed that Aubing had 97 properties with a total of 270 buildings.

For the years 1801 to 1810, Josef Steinbacher compiled a list of deaths for the entire parish of Aubing from the parish registers. During this ten-year period, he counted 980 births, 612 children who died (62%), and a total of 901 deaths. This indicates that 68% of all deaths were children. A comparison with another source suggests that the term "children" in this context refers to individuals up to the age of one. The causes of death in children are cited as smallpox, diarrhea, whooping cough, and "inadequate assistance during childbirth." The most common cause of death in adults was "Heart failure".

=== Church planting ===
The Bavarian municipal edict of 1818 also established the municipality of Aubing, which was governed by a municipal committee elected by all tax-paying citizens, primarily landowners. This committee was headed by an elected head of the municipality. Until 1870, there were seven village heads, all of whom were respected local farmers. A total of ten mayors are recorded between 1870 and the incorporation of the municipality into Munich in 1942.

When Aubing was incorporated, the Hofmark Freiham, which included the Freiham estate and Moosschwaige, also became part of Aubing. However, large areas in the north of the former district no longer belonged to it. In addition to agriculture, the professions of barber, fisherman, metalsmith, butcher, cooper, tailor, weaver, and innkeeper are documented. The first major investment was constructing a school in 1821/22 (today's Alto Street 16, school and sacristan's house until 1894). In addition to elementary education, the parish was responsible for caring for the poor and sick. As a result, a poorhouse was established despite the poor financial situation of the parish. Needy unmarried mothers were also supported. Peat for heating and cleaning and scouring sand from the Aubinger Lohe were delivered to Munich.

From 1816 to 1848, the Counts of Yrsch, the owners of the Freiham estate, held the lower jurisdiction.

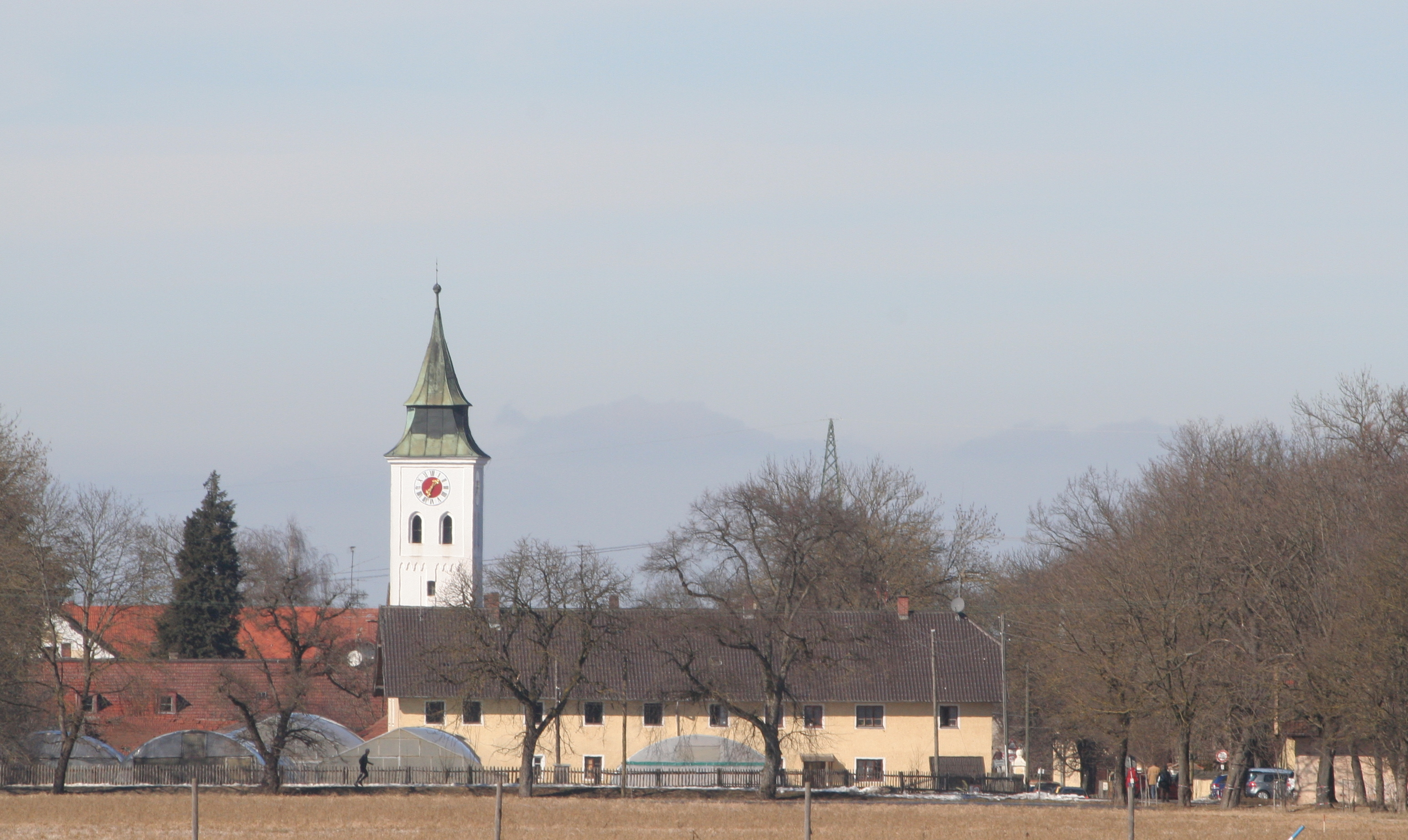
The Freiham estate had belonged to the municipality of Aubing since 1818.

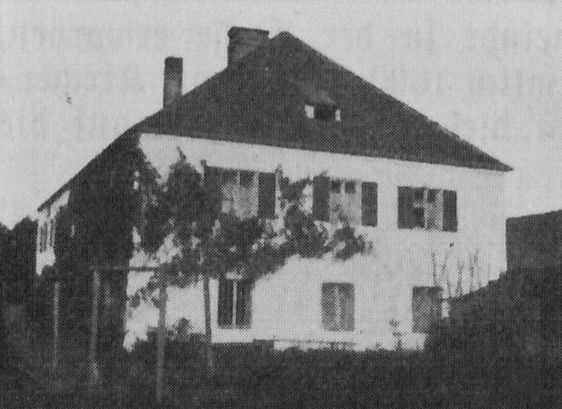
The old school building from 1822 in a photo from 1914

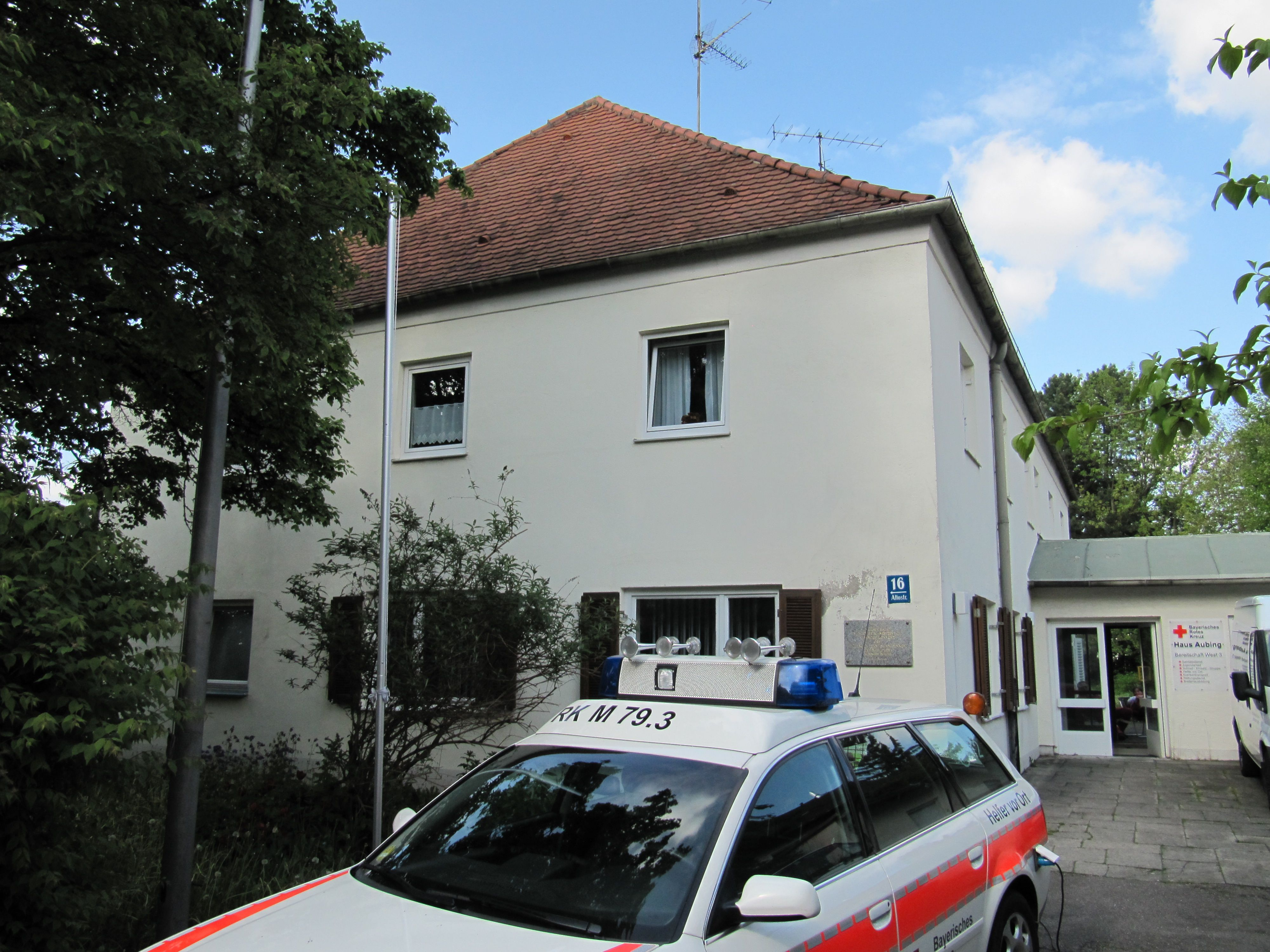
The old school building is now used by the Bavarian Red Cross.

=== Aubing in the "Main report on the cholera epidemic of 1854 in the Kingdom of Bavaria" ===
The cholera epidemic of 1836/37 affected Aubing only to a small extent. During the next epidemic in 1854, however, 68 people died in the Aubing community within three months, 42 of them (39 according to another source) in Aubing itself. This meant that the disease killed about one in twenty people in Aubing. The survivors then vowed to celebrate an annual high mass for the patron saint against epidemics, St. Sebastian.

In 1856, the Royal Commission for Scientific Investigations into Indian Cholera published the first part of its main report on the 1854 cholera epidemic in the Kingdom of Bavaria. The death figures in this report (see table) are likely to be incomplete, but they do provide information about the regional spread of the disease. They also show that the disease was particularly severe in Aubing, where the death rate was twice that of Munich.

For this reason, commission member Max Pettenkofer personally visited Aubing in June 1856. The main report mentioned above includes a "presentation" of his findings. At that time, it was still unclear how cholera spread from person to person and what other factors might have played a role. For example, soil and living conditions were discussed and described in the report. The presentation therefore offers interesting insights beyond the disease itself.

Cholera deaths according to "main report"
	1836/37		1854	
Place	Inhabitants	Deaths	Inhabitants	Deaths
Aubing	609	1	787	30
Freyham	70	2		
Lochhausen		0	78	1
Langwied		0	120	1
Allach	401	3	416	6
Untermenzing	216	10	266	4
Obermenzing	280	8	127	1
Pasing	411	5		0
Laim		0		0
Munich	84,437	802	106,715	2223

Pettenkofer quotes a report by the court physician Dr. Kranz. While Dr. Kranz reported "many poor" in other places like Schwabing and Sendling, he wrote about Aubing:

There are no real poor people in Aubing. Everyone has a decent, nutritious diet and adequate clothing. The entire population is engaged in agriculture and is otherwise a strong tribe of people; apart from spring fever (malaria), there are few other diseases in Aubing.

And at another point:

The waste rooms in Aubing are in all houses except (outside)' the apartments, 10-20 steps away from the house, at or on the manure places. In the only rectory, the privy is next to the kitchen and the cesspool goes under the house.

During his visit to Aubing, Pettenkofer, with the help of Pastor Gigl, first reconstructed exactly when and where the cholera cases had occurred. He counted 39 deaths in 18 houses and found that all the affected houses were in the northern, lower-lying part of the village, while the southern, higher-lying part remained free of cholera. Examination of the wells belonging to each house revealed that the water table in the wells in the lowest part of the village was about three feet below the surface, while in the higher area it reached over 17 feet. The villagers reported that the cholera year had been very wet and that the well levels were generally several feet higher. Pettenkofer also noted a flow of groundwater from the higher, southern, unaffected part to the affected, lower, northern part.

Pettenkofer discussed the possibility that the risk of infection depended on the amount of public traffic, but rejected this because there were no cases in the house of the local headman, the vicarage, or the inn. He concluded:

Aubing is therefore also a clear demonstration that personal contact alone is not sufficient for the development of an epidemic, however necessary it may be, and that other factors must also be involved, one of which is the local situation.

Although he suggested elsewhere in his presentation that the influence of groundwater levels was likely, he did not discuss the possibility of a pathogen being carried in the water.

=== Rail connection, Pasing rises ===
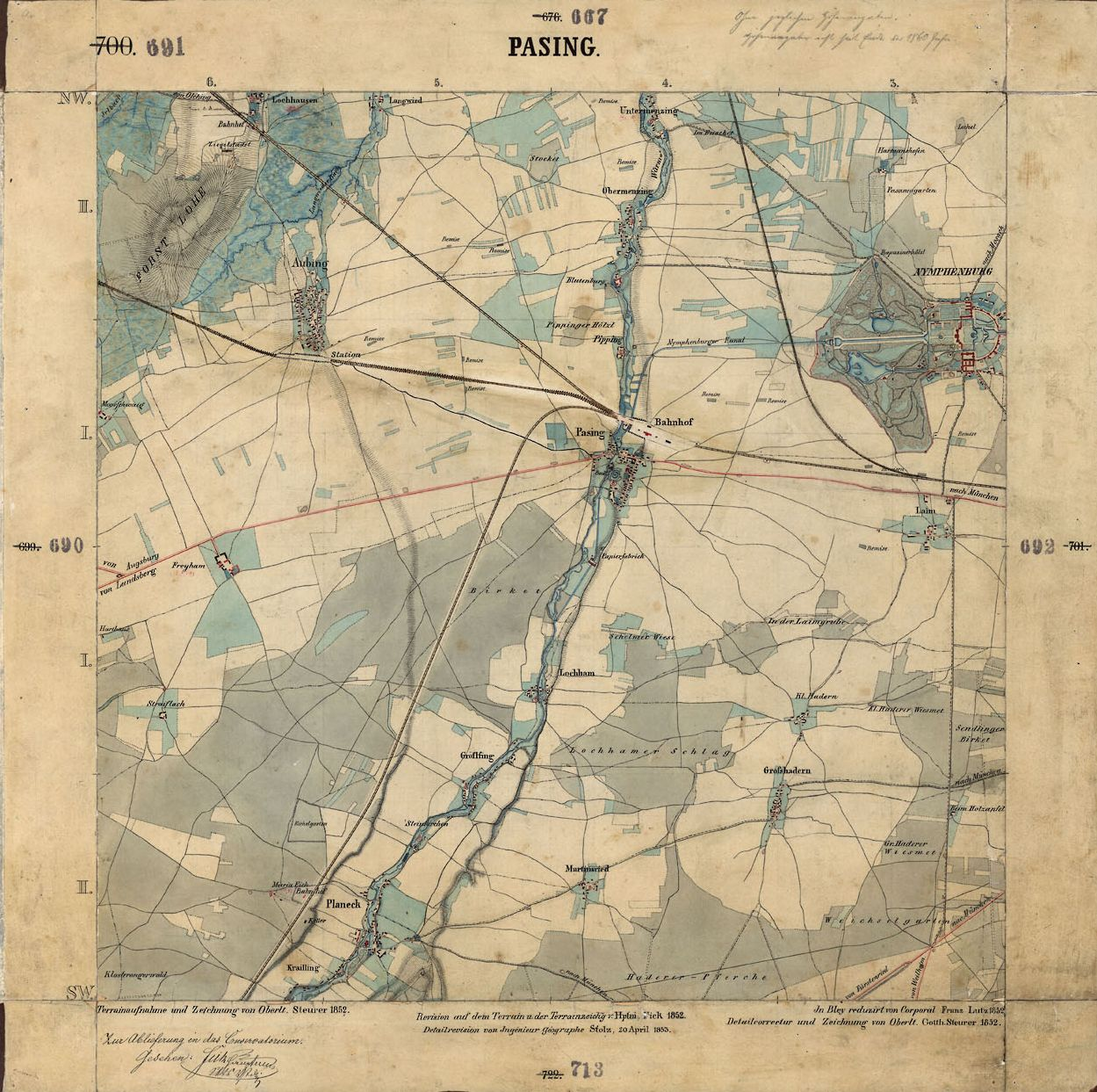
Map of Pasing and the surrounding area, 1855. The railroad line to Buchloe was added later.

For centuries, Aubing was the main town west of Munich. In 1836 Aubing had 609 inhabitants, Pasing only 411.

The railroad played an important role in this development. On September 1, 1839, the first section of the Munich-Augsburg railway line was opened from Munich via Pasing to Lochhausen. Although the line passed through Aubing, the trains did not stop there. Pasing, on the other hand, benefited from the new railroad and its population grew rapidly, reaching 12,090 in 1925. In 1861, Pasing got its first Catholic priest, and in 1881 it became an independent parish with branch churches in Laim and Obermenzing. A Protestant parish was added in 1907. In 1905, Pasing was elevated to the status of a city.

On May 1, 1873, the Munich-Buchloe railroad was inaugurated and Aubing received a railroad connection. The line, built along the route of an originally planned canal, passed directly south of the town's buildings at that time; the Aubing station was not far from the parish church of St. Quirin. Aubing was thus easily accessible and the population began to grow, reaching 1700 at the beginning of the 20th century.

Most of the inhabitants still lived from agriculture. Living in Aubing was cheap compared to the royal residence city of Munich and therefore popular with middle-income earners so that a lot of building land changed hands. The first general practitioner settled in Aubing in 1861, before that the population had been cared for by bathers. From 1901 to 1910, there were a total of 1112 births, 502 deaths (45%) and a total of 626 deaths in the municipality of Aubing. The term "children" probably refers to those in their first year of life. During this period, the child death rate fell from over 50% at the beginning to under 40% from 1907. The contemporary chronicler Steinbacher attributed this to "increased wages" and the associated more favorable living conditions.

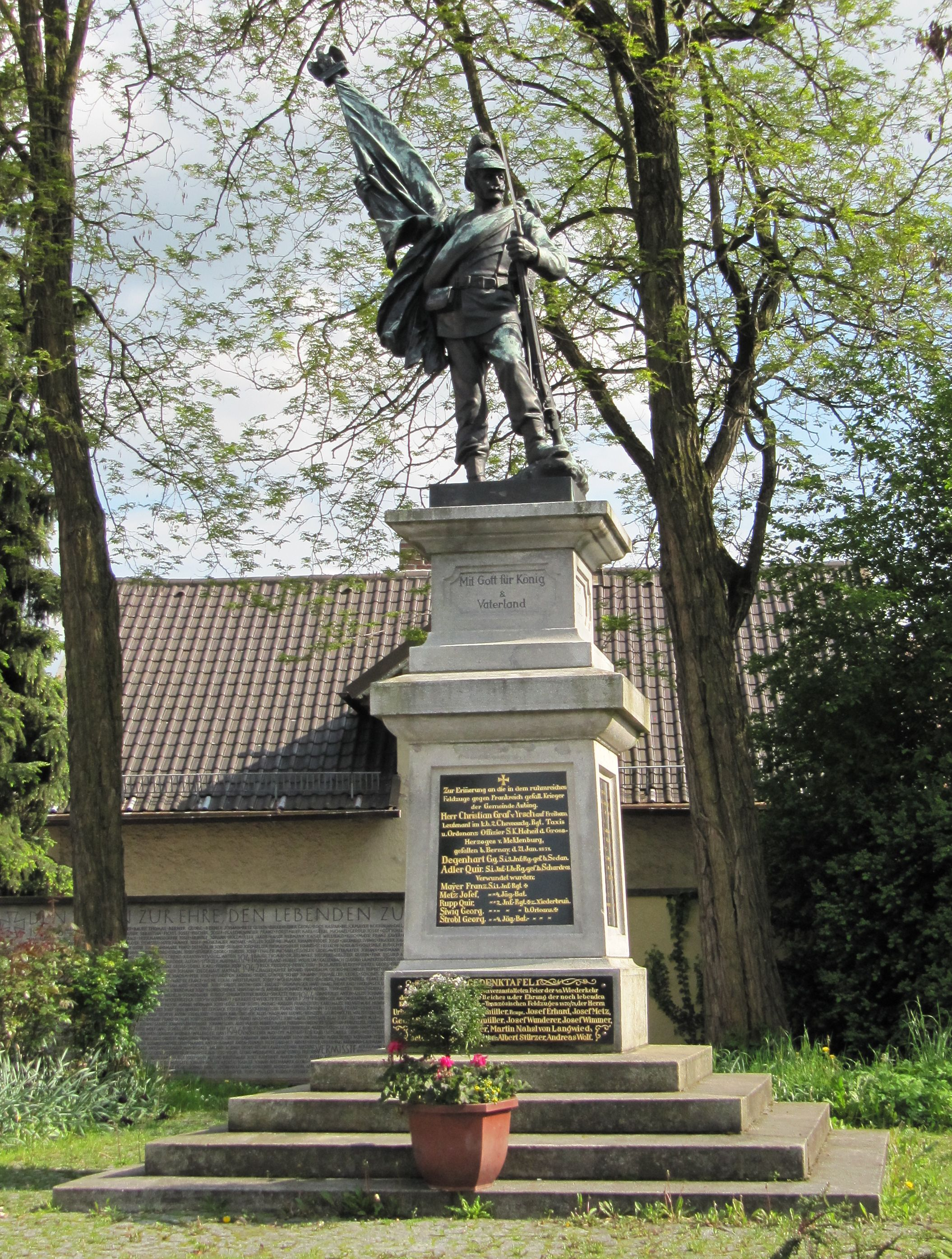
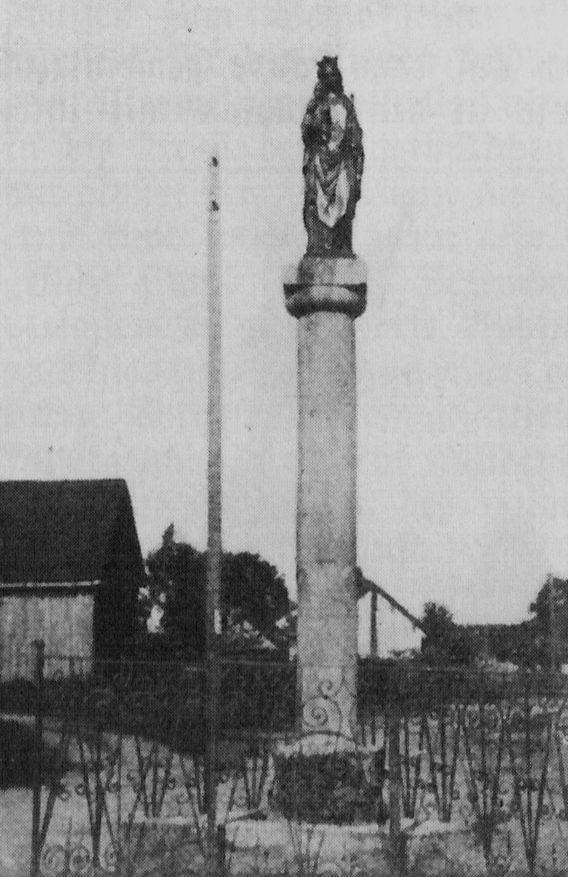
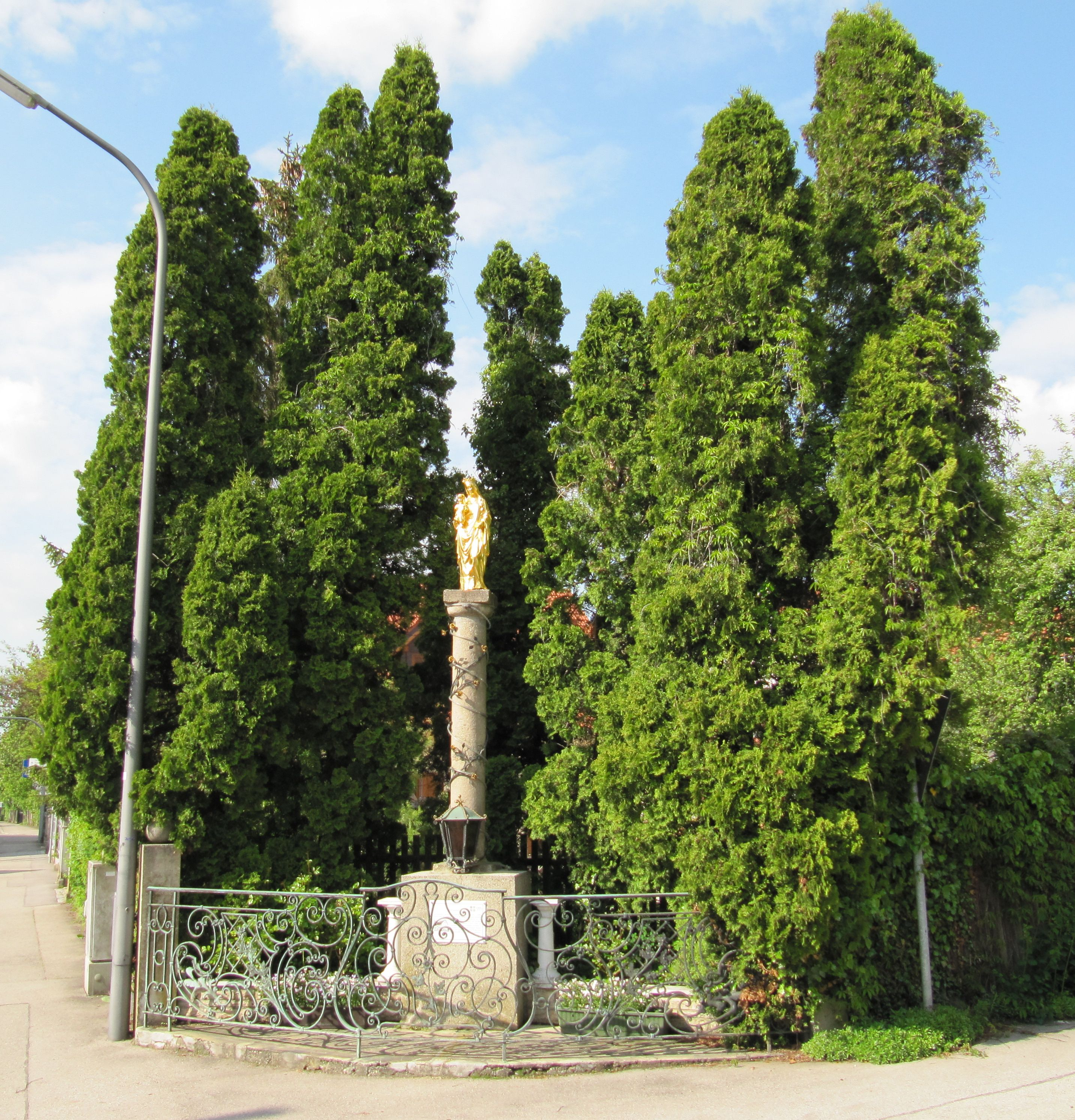
On the left, the Aubing railroad station, no longer preserved, next to it is the war memorial, erected after the French-German War (1870/71). In the center, the Mariensäule at its original location at the intersection of Ubostraße/Spieltränkergasse, erected by two Aubing residents as thanks for their healthy return from this war; next to it at its current location, after the National Socialists had it removed as a traffic obstruction in 1936. Historical photos are from around 1914.
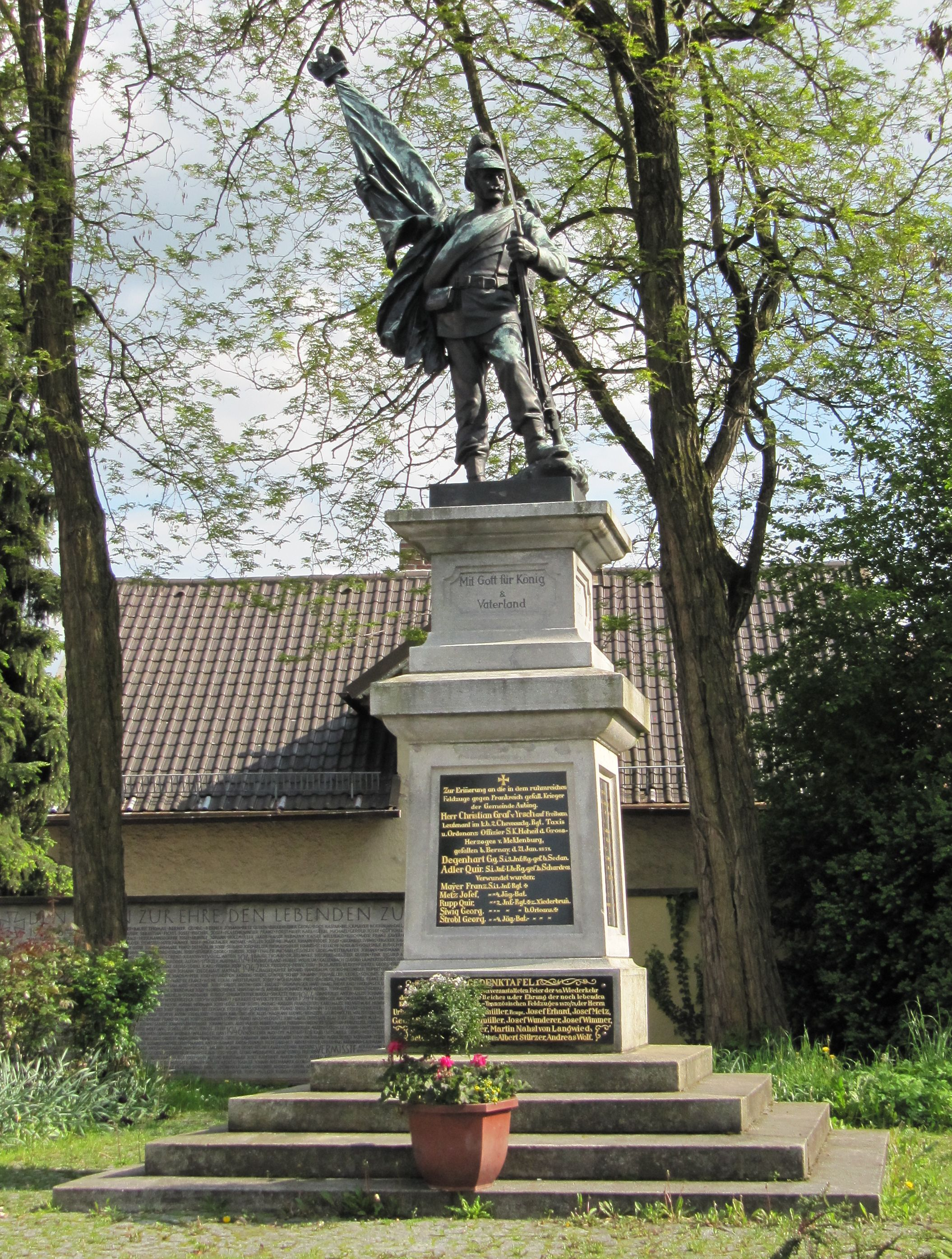
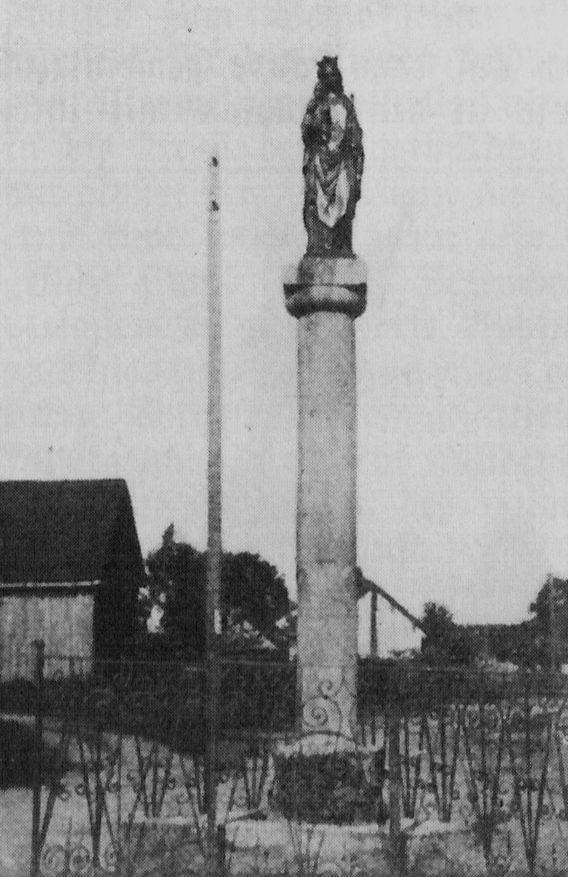
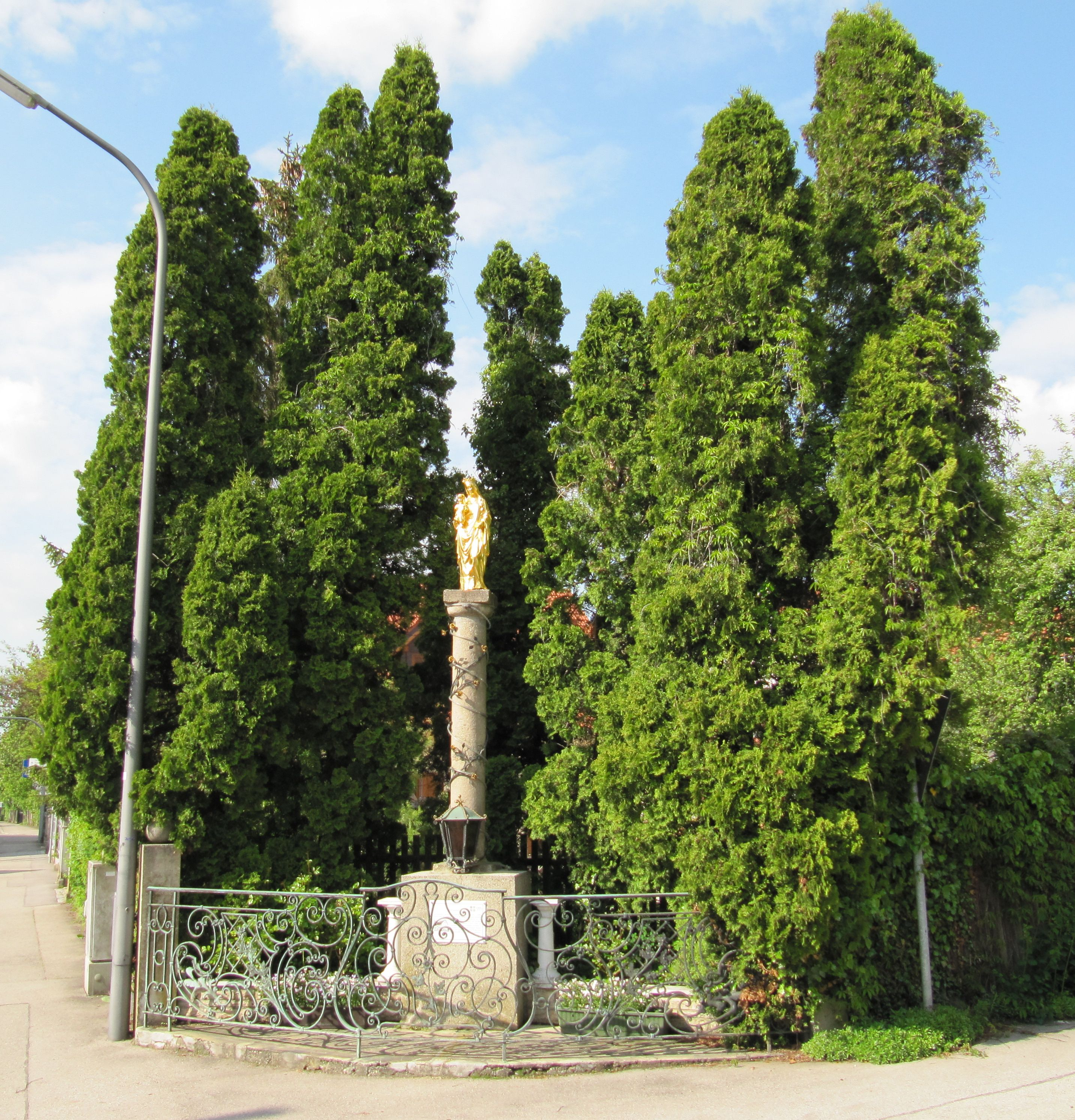
On the left, the Aubing train station, no longer preserved, next to it is the war memorial, erected after the French-German War (1870/71). In the center, the Mariensäule at its original location at the intersection of Ubostraße/Spieltränkergasse, erected by two Aubing citizens in gratitude for their healthy return from this war; next to it at its current location, after the National Socialists had it removed as a traffic obstruction in 1936. Historical photos are from around 1914.

=== Industrialization ===
==== Chemical factory Aubing ====
The Aubing Chemical Factory was probably the oldest industrial settlement in Aubing. In 1894, the Jewish Munich merchant Julius Einhorn acquired the Betzenhaus, a small farm located to the east of Aubing's village center, and built a factory building next to the farm from 1895. The site to the north of the Munich-Buchloe railroad line was given its own railway siding in 1920. In 1905, Einhorn sold the factory to the chemist Moritz Bloch, who continued to expand the business until its Aryanization in 1938 and then emigrated to New York, where he died in 1942. The factory, which specialized in adhesives and pharmaceuticals and had a worldwide distribution network, was run by Bloch's son Kurt from 1949 after the reassignment and then by his executor until 1978, when it was closed. The site was sold to a property developer. Today, only the street names Fabrikstraße and Industriestraße still bear witness to the family business.

==== Aubing brickworks ====
In 1898, the first Aubing brickworks company was founded to produce bricks from the clay-rich soil south of Aubing station. The clay tongue, which in earlier times had made grain cultivation possible in the first place, was now mined. The " new Munich brickworks" acquired an area of 142 acres (about 48 hectares) south of Aubing station. In the same year, the company name was changed, again around 1913, then to " New Munich Stocks - Brickworks Ltd. in Munich", as the company's headquarters were in Munich. In 1934, this was moved to Aubing, shortly before the decision to liquidate the company in the same year. After the sale of the company premises, the liquidation of the company was completed in 1942. The buyer initially leased the site, so that production continued after the Second World War until 1962. Although there was still enough clay available, production was no longer profitable.

The area to be exploited stretched from Pretzfelder Straße in the north to Wiesentfelser Straße in the south, bordered to the east by the Limesschule and other buildings and to the west by Neideckstraße (both of which are now street names). The brickworks itself was located in the north of this area, southwest of the intersection of Pretzfelder Straße and Streitbergstraße. It included drying barns and kilns as well as a tall chimney. The clay mined with picks and shovels sometimes had to be transported several hundred meters to the site on trolleys. The resulting terrain steps can only be seen today on Streitbergstrasse and Neideckstrasse.

The date of the start of production is not known, but it is known that production began in 1901. Municipal records for this year list 50 workers over the age of 16, five between 14 and 16 and three under 14. The number of workers fluctuated greatly, in the following year there were only three, before rising again to 50 to 60. In the years before the First World War, the average number of employees here was therefore higher than at the Aubing chemical factory, which at that time had around 10-20 employees as the South German Ceresin Works Aubing. Most of the workers in the brickworks were probably seasonal workers from the Italian Alps. A letter from the Royal District Office of Munich from 1901 has been preserved, which stipulates minimum standards for their accommodation, from which it can be concluded that the working conditions were poor.

Operations were suspended during the First World War. After that, only 30 to 40 workers were employed, partly due to some modernization, apart from a temporary shutdown during the global economic crisis in 1932/33. In 1934, a newspaper article described that "... the wages for about 30 to 50 workers, who for the most part turn over their weekly wages back in Aubing" were an essential factor for the economic life of the community. In November 1939, the company was shut down again due to a shortage of labor caused by the war. Production was probably resumed in 1948 and continued until 1962.

The brickworks was demolished in 1963 and the site is now occupied by residential buildings. However, the building of the company inn "Zur Lüfte" in Pretzfelder Straße, which was built in 1903 and still serves as a guesthouse today, has been preserved.

==== Central workshop Aubing ====
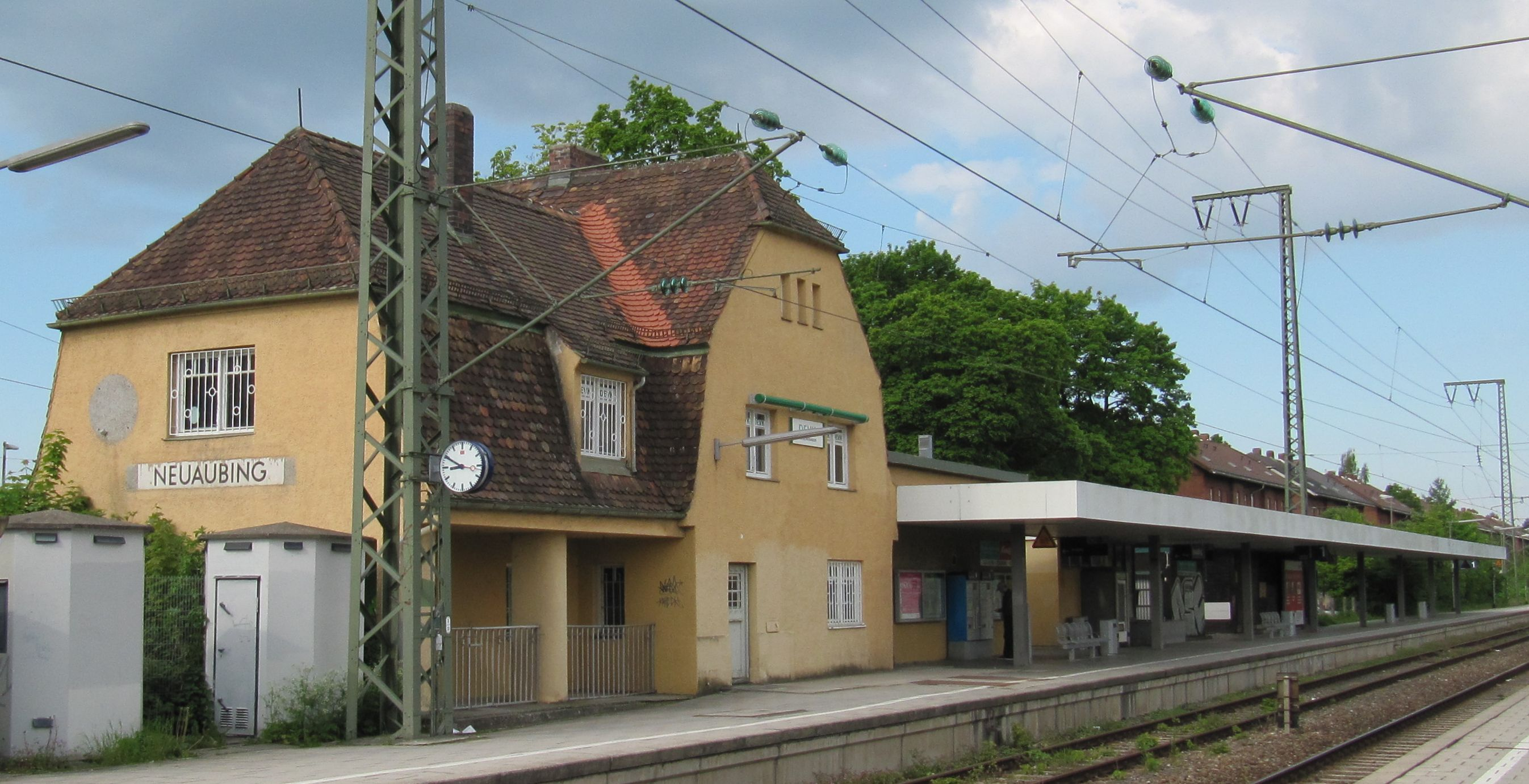
Neuaubing station

On July 3, 1903, the railroad line from Pasing to Herrsching am Ammersee, which ran south of the Aubing area, opened. Even before that, in 1901, the Bavarian state parliament decided to build the "V. central workshop of the royal Bavarian state railway", the later railway repair works, south of this line on a site belonging to the Freiham estate. The land was made available at a reasonable price by Hugo Ritter and Edler von Maffei, who had acquired Freiham in 1887. As the owner of the very loss-making Ammersee/Amper shipping company, he had an economic interest in this railroad line. As the railroad had its planning authority, it was not necessary to obtain the consent of the municipality of Aubing.

The station (today Neuaubing) was opened in 1905, the Central Workshop Aubing in 1906. The number of employees at this repair works of the Royal Bavarian State Railways grew from 351 in 1906 to over 500 in 1913 and over 1500 after the demobilization of the Bavarian army in 1919. During the First World War, many prisoners of war were deployed. When the Deutsche Reichsbahn was founded, the facilities became known as the Reichsbahn-Neuaubing Repair Works, which was later taken over by the Deutsche Bundesbahn. Alongside Dornier, the large repair plant was the most important local employer for generations and helped shape the culture of life in Aubing in the 20th century. At the end of the 1960s, the railroad was already considering the dissolution of the repair works, but in 1969 those responsible decided to keep it in a reduced form, which would bring economic advantages for the location in the course of modernization and reorganization. After the collapse of the Iron Curtain in 1990, the calls for closure and capacity reduction became louder again. From 1997, the plant was assigned to the DB Travel & Tourism transport division as a C plant. Until the beginning of 2001, 530 employees were still working on the repair of passenger coaches; in June of the same year, the management board of Deutsche Bahn AG decided to close the Neuaubing plant by the end of the year.

==== Compagnie Internationale des Wagon-Lits et des Grands Express Européens ====
In addition to the state-owned repair workshop, a repair workshop of the French International Sleeping and Dining Car Company (Compagnie Internationale des Wagon-Lits et des Grands Express Européens) ISG (CIWL), which later operated under the name ISG and DSG Ltd Neuaubing Workshops, existed in its immediate vicinity from 1913 until December 31, 2000.

Sleeping cars with teak carriages were built in Neuaubing until 1924, when the company switched to all-steel construction. The more than 600 employees also rebuilt and built sleeping and dining cars. The factory closed in 1925 and was temporarily used as a warehouse before the Dornier factory was built (see next chapter). The company Engineering Neuaubing, founded in 1945, again carried out maintenance work on behalf of ISG, and in 1947 the factory once again belonged to ISG. Due to bomb damage, some of the work had to be done outdoors. In 1957, a cooperation with the German Sleeper and Dining Car Company (DSG) was established.

In 1966, the refurbishment of DSG dining cars was discontinued as they became the property of the Bundesbahn. The independent DSG operation of sleeping cars also ended in 1974. In 1990, 150 employees were still refurbishing between 380 and 400 cars per year for ISG and cars for TUI-FerienExpress and the Mittelthurgau travel agency. Due to the sharp decline in overnight travel in the following decade, the plant became unprofitable and was closed at the end of 1999.

Munich hall operator Wolfgang Nöth leased the site in mid-2013.

==== Dornier works ====
In 1934, an independent company, Dornier-Werke, leased factory facilities from the Compagnie Internationale des Wagons-Lits, which, like the railway workshops, were located south of the Pasing-Herrsching railway line, but immediately east of Brunhamstrasse. In 1935, series production of the Dornier Do 23 aircraft began. The Neuaubing plant was purchased in 1937. The plant was located near Neuaubing and was also referred to as the Neuaubing plant. However, the land east of Brunhamstrasse and south of the railroad tracks belonged to the city of Pasing, even though the Pasing buildings were far away. This area and a strip east of Brunhamstrasse on both sides of Bodenseestrasse later became part of Aubing. In 1938, Dornier employed 2800 people. During the war, the factory produced Junkers Ju 88 and Messerschmitt Me 410 aircraft, using forced labor from 1941 and concentration camp prisoners from 1943. The factory buildings were damaged by bombs and confiscated by the Americans after the fall of Munich.

After 1945, the Allies banned aircraft production, which was resumed in Neuaubing in early 1956 with the successful Dornier Do 27. It was the first German aircraft to be produced in series since 1945. Production of the Do 27 was discontinued in Neuaubing in 1966. In 1958, the factory began work on its successor, the Dornier Do 28. The world's first experimental vertical take-off aircraft, the Dornier Do 31, was built in Neuaubing and in the factory's hangar in Oberpfaffenhofen from 1962. In 1991, the Dornier shareholders' meeting transferred the Neuaubing plant to Deutsche Airbus GmbH. In 1993, shortly before its closure, 1161 employees were still building parts for Airbus. Today, the site of the former factory is home to a business park that rents out commercial space.

=== The beginnings of Neuaubing and the founding of further residential areas ===
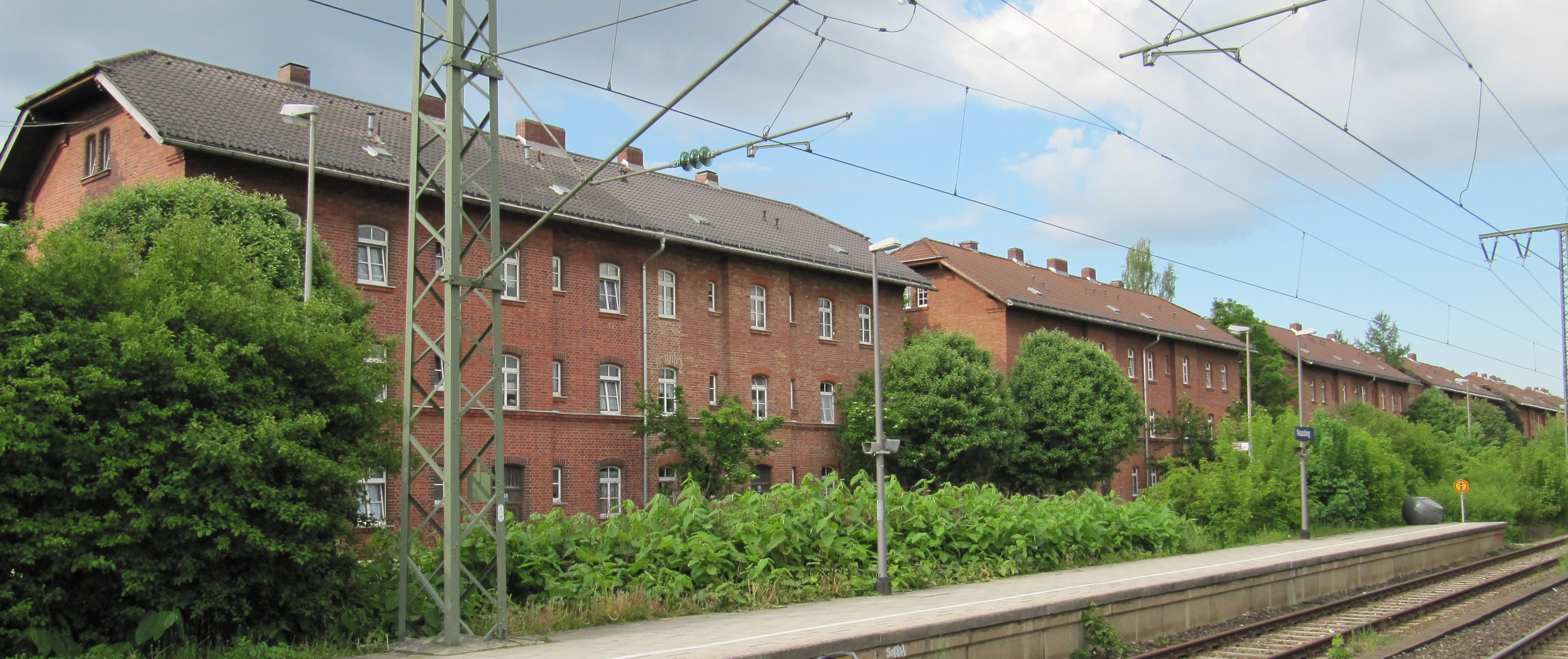
Railroad workers' apartments, Papinstraße 13

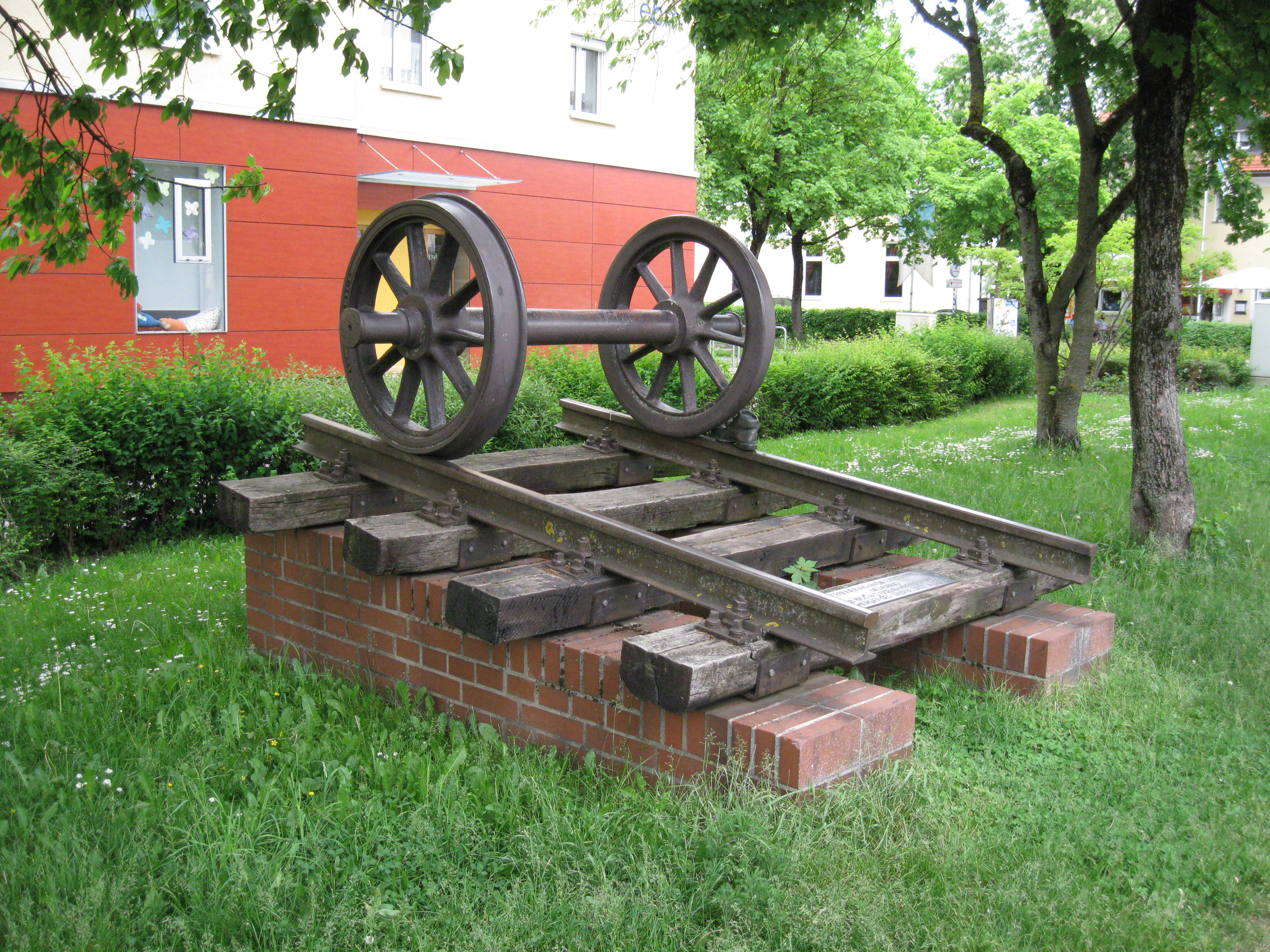
Monument to Neuaubing as a railroad settlement at the beginning of Wiesentfelserstraße.

For the workers and officials of the Central Workshop, the first housing estate was built on today's Papinstraße, south of the new railroad line and two kilometers from Alt-Aubing, the so-called colony. The new district of Aubing-Süd also grew north of the railroad. However, the name Neuaubing soon caught on and became official in 1915. Since the new citizens from all parts of Bavaria had no taxable home or property, they could not become citizens of the German Empire. It was not until 1919, in the Weimar Republic, that they were allowed to vote. As a state-owned enterprise, the railroad was exempt from municipal taxes. However, the municipality had to provide the necessary infrastructure. As was to be expected, there was friction, for example over the provision of schools.

The Munich Railway Building Association (Eisenbahner-Baugenossenschaft München, ebm), founded in 1908, played an important role in the provision of housing. Its housing estate along Limesstrasse south of Plankenfelserstrasse was built in several stages from 1908 until after the Second World War. The transformation from a farming village to a commercial center and the resulting population growth also necessitated a number of public works projects. In addition to the road network, these included a church, a school, and a waterworks with the Aubing water tower, built in 1910 and visible from afar. The necessary expenditures were such a burden on the community that in 1914 the local council applied for incorporation into the financially strong neighboring town of Pasing, which had by then been elevated to the status of a city. However, due to Aubing's poor financial situation, the town council refused.

North of the Munich-Buchloe railroad line, in the far east of Aubing, the new settlement of Aubing-Ost was built in 1909. At the eastern end of today's Aubing-Ost-Straße, the settlement area extended to the north and south. The Free Association Aubing-Ost (since 1956 Settlers' Association Aubing-Ost e. V.), founded in 1913, supported the settlement by buying and selling land and procuring materials. In 1933, 250 residents lived in 50 houses. During the Third Reich, the northeastern part of the settlement was demolished to make way for a new railroad siding. Until the 1970s, the settlement was separated from the rest of the city by fields. With the opening of the Leienfelsstraße station in 1972, the estate was connected to the rapid transit network.

Only a few hundred meters north of the railway workers' workshop, a housing estate for the employees of the Dornier factory was built in 1937/38 with about 140 houses. The estate was officially named after the Nazi Minister President Ludwig Siebert, but was also known as the Dornier Estate. The current name is Siedlung am Gößweinsteinplatz. A few years later, during the Second World War, the barracks of the Neuaubing forced labor camp, which still exists today, were built directly west of the Dornier estate.

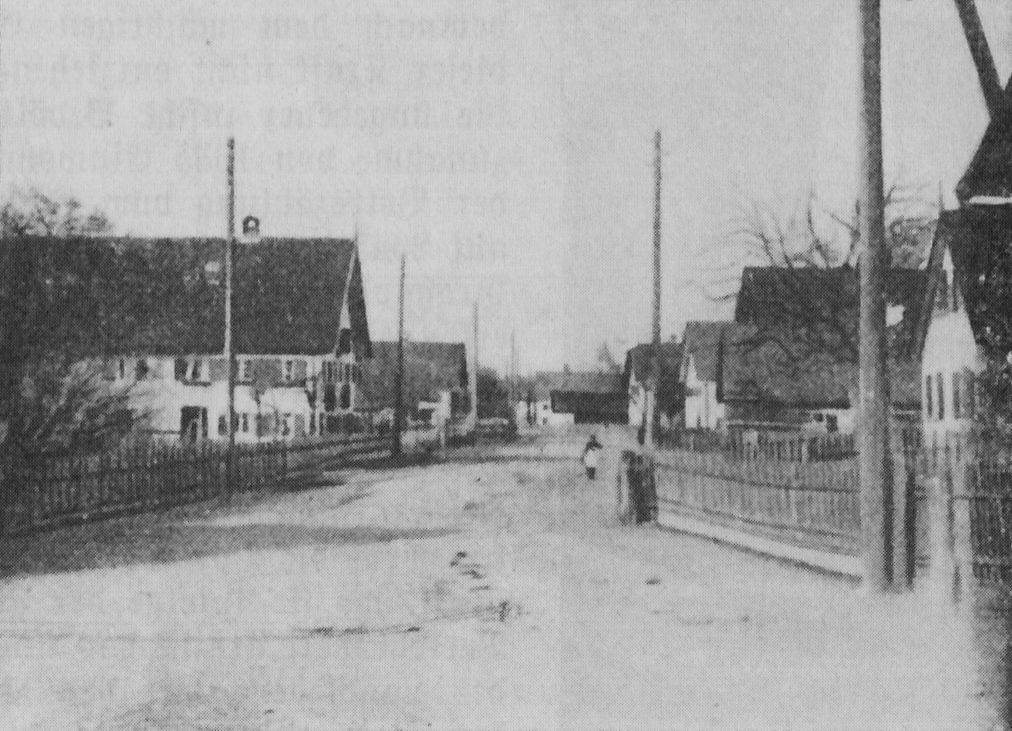
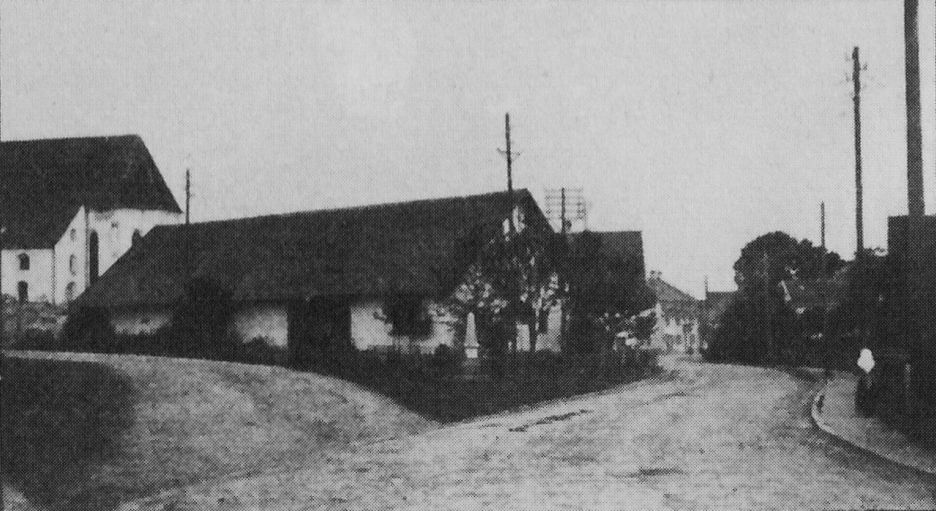
Views of Alt-Aubing around 1914. On the left is a panorama from the east. In the middle is "Bauerngasse", today Ubostraße, on the right is Gütlergasse. Here, the choir of St. Quirin's church juts into the picture on the left. The electricity pylons bear witness to the electrification that had already taken place.

=== Dispute over the Neuaubing school building ===
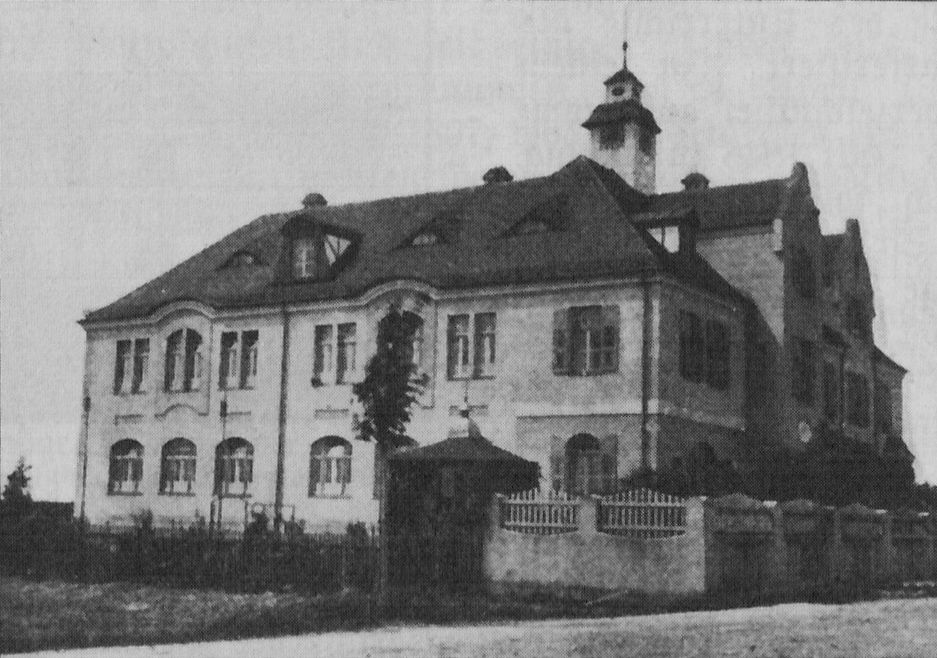
A view of the "new school building" from the south in 1915, with the road on the right. Today, the passage to the gymnasium is in front of the south wall.

As a result of the construction of the central workshop and the resulting population growth, the Munich district office recorded an influx of 100 school-age children as early as 1904. For this reason, the district office repeatedly asked the community of Aubing to build a new school. However, the local authorities were reluctant to do so, arguing that those responsible for establishing the Central Workshop should also finance the necessary infrastructure. The county government accommodated the community financially by providing grants and having a plan drawn up free of charge for the community. Finally, the railroad agreed to contribute as well. In the end, the municipality agreed, but it had to take out loans, which were financed by levies on the taxpaying citizens, i.e., property owners other than the railroad.

The Aubing parish priest offered the land to the parish, and the "Aubing Freiham School" was opened in 1906. Due to its location between Old Aubing and the new settlement, this led to the two areas growing together in the following years.

The school originally offered seven grades. In 1909, the board of the Aubing Youth Welfare Association approached the Royal Government of Upper Bavaria with an urgent request to introduce an eighth year of schooling throughout Aubing. Since boys were not allowed to learn a trade until the age of 14, they would have a year off after school at an age when they "need the strictest supervision and the most loving guidance," but often both parents have to work. Idleness and aimlessness, the cause of misery, were to be avoided by obliging those boys who did not want to work in agriculture, but who wanted to learn a trade, to attend an eighth year of school. In 1910 there were already 120 students. 30 Protestant children went to school in neighboring Pasing. In 1928/29, a first extension doubled the number of classrooms to eight with 321 students.

=== A new cemetery ===
A new Aubing Cemetery was established in 1909 and is still in use today. It is located south of the old village center, on the south side of the railroad line to Buchloe. A contemporary report described the site as "free on the railroad line from Munich to Bruck, without connection to the village". In 1909, the site consisted of three dayworks (a good 10,000 m^{2}), two of which were initially fenced off for use. The architect was Adolf Fraaß, who also designed the Neuaubing school building. The above-mentioned contemporary report states:

The morgue was deliberately designed in friendly shapes and colors; the architect wanted to avoid the usual gloomy coloring for this country cemetery. A simple building, plastered white, with a steep hip roof, the porch supported by four columns, green shutters, and trellis cladding on the side fronts; so the house is sunny rather than sad- which was the intention.

The report went on to say that in addition to the inhumation room, the dissection room, and the priest's room, the building also contained a caretaker's apartment. The cost of the building was just under 12,000 marks, and the total cost of the cemetery, including roads and drainage, was about 30,000 marks.

Cemetery building and main entrance 1911 and 2020

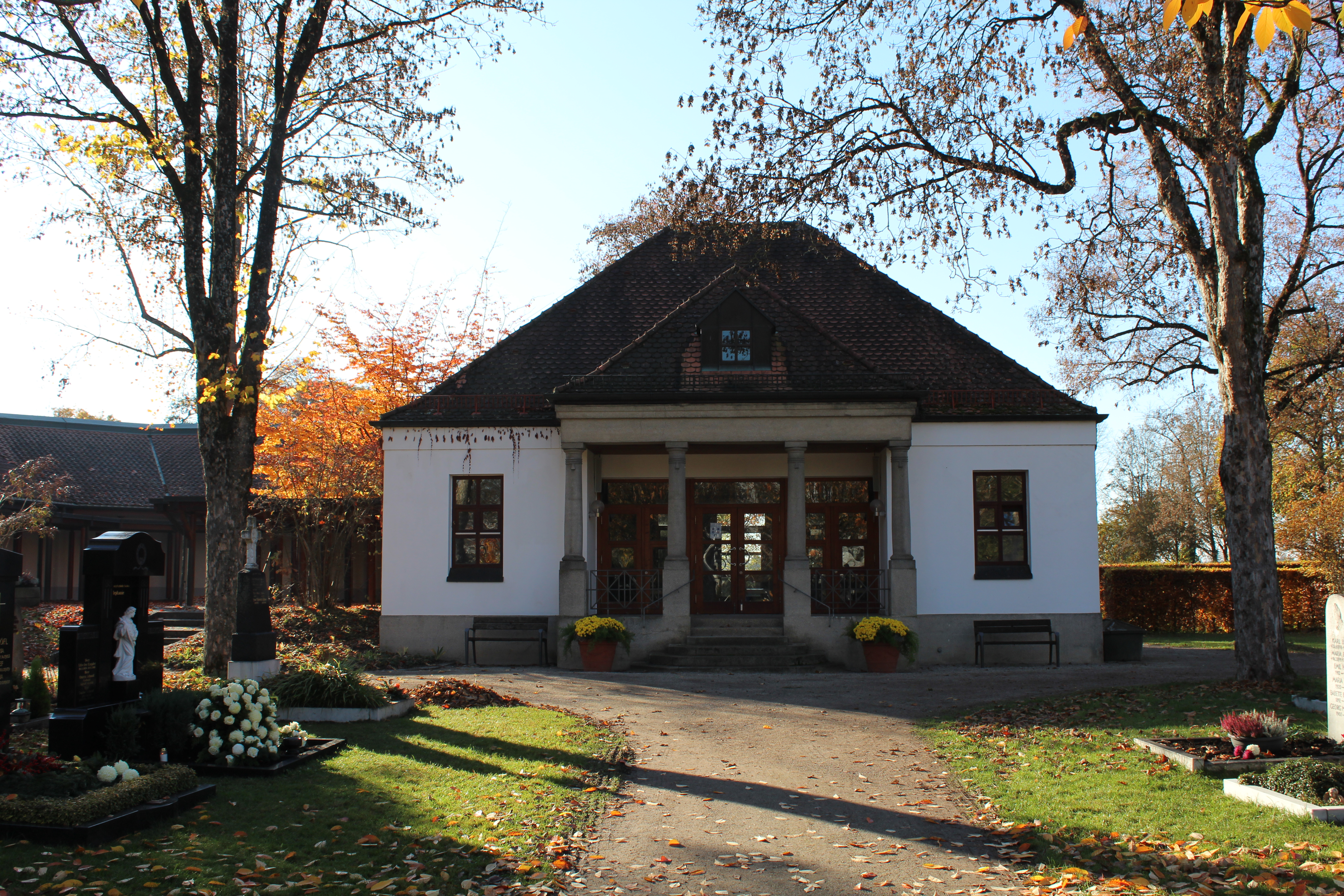

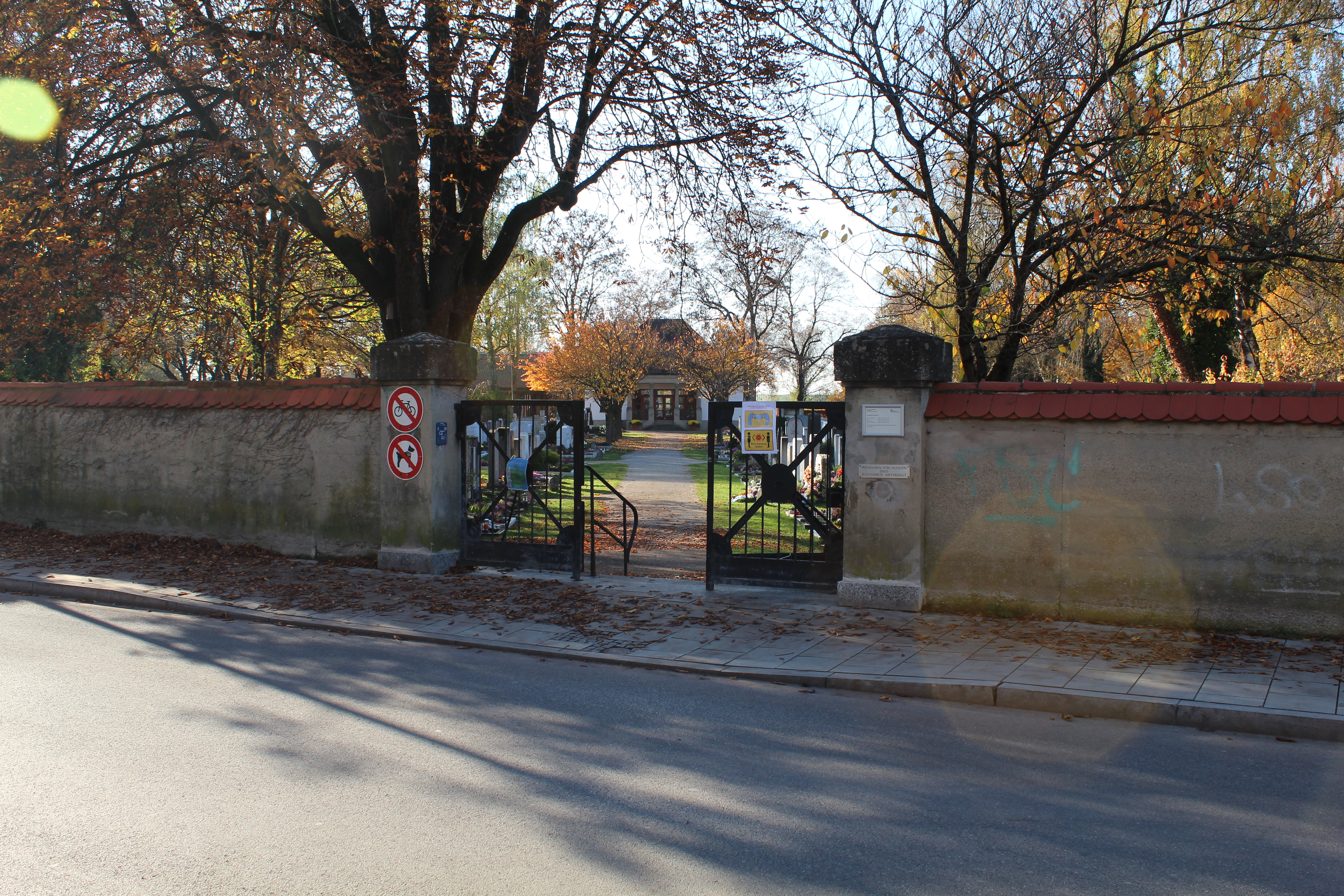

=== The political situation from 1914 onwards ===
At the beginning of World War I in 1914, 82 men from Aubing, including fathers with up to eight children, were drafted into the army. 88 Aubing men lost their lives in the war. This was about one-tenth of the adult male population, as there were 874 men eligible to vote in the 1919 municipal elections. The deterioration of the supply situation due to the trade blockades against the German Reich led to the rationing of all raw materials and food in the community. Since many women were working, about 120 children attended the children's home of the Franciscan nuns in Dillingen. The children also received a meal there, made possible by a monthly donation of 250 Reichsmarks from the owner of the Aubing chemical factory, Moritz Bloch. Dr. Bloch later became an honorary citizen of the community. Nevertheless, he had to give up his factory during the Third Reich because he was Jewish (see Aubing Chemical Factory). During the war, 54 Russian prisoners of war from a camp in neighboring Puchheim were used in agriculture.

After the November Revolution of 1918 and the proclamation of the "Free People's State of Bavaria" by Kurt Eisner, an 18-member workers' and peasants' council first demanded the resignation of the mayor and the municipal committee in January 1919. This was immediately rejected by the district authorities. After the proclamation of the Bavarian Soviet Republic on April 7, 1919, the municipal committee was again asked to resign under threat of violence. Mayor Josef Widmann had already handed over the administration to the second mayor Jakob Dallmayer in February. Four commissions, consisting of members of the municipal committee and council members, were to take care of various tasks in the municipality. However, according to a protocol dated April 28, the municipal committee was reinstated. Shortly thereafter, on May 1, white troops entered Aubing. On the same day, the local committee passed a resolution demanding the release of three arrested shop stewards.

The municipal elections of June 1919 marked the first time that women could vote and be elected; the first woman to be nominated, but not elected, was in 1924. In 1919, out of 1418 eligible voters, including 874 men and 617 women, 1008 cast valid votes (71%) (see table). In the parallel mayoral election, Georg Seeholzer of the Farmers' Association received the most votes (617).

Municipal council election June 15, 1919
	Votes	Seats
Bavarian People's Party (BVP)	343	5
Bavarian Peasants' League	267	4
USPD	197	3
SPD	145	2
Interest grouping	52	–

In the municipal elections on December 7, 1924, only three groups stood for election, a "civic association" (9 seats), the SPD (3 seats), and the KPD (2 seats). The mayor was now elected by the city council, Josef Schmidt of the " Civil Association " received 8 votes. The last free municipal election in Aubing, on December 8, 1929, was again contested by five groups: The " Aubing Electoral Community " (6 seats), the SPD (3 seats), the " Aubing Economic Bloc ", the " Aubing Free Association " (2 seats) and the KPD (1 seat). Josef Schmidt was re-elected mayor with 11 votes.

=== Beginning of National Socialism ===
On March 15, 1930, a local group of the Der Stahlhelm, Bund der Frontsoldaten was founded in Aubing, followed by a local group of the NSDAP on September 30, 1930. Some of its politicians had previously been active in other groups. The future NSDAP mayor Heinrich Graf, for example, had previously been a candidate for the Aubing Free Association. As a counterweight to the Nazi associations, the trade unions, the SPD, the Reichsbanner Schwarz-Rot-Gold, the Free Gymnastics, and other associations founded a local group of the Iron Front in Neuaubing on July 23, 1932. On the occasion of the seizure of power on January 30, 1933, the SA and SS organized torchlight parades in Aubing and Neuaubing.

Imperial elections March 5, 1933
	Votes	Percent
NSDAP	989	33,6
SPD	699	23,8
Bavarian People's Party	573	19,5
KPD	435	14,8
Other	244	8,3

In the parliamentary elections on March 5, 1933, 3331 eligible voters cast 2940 valid votes. The NSDAP became the strongest party in Aubing, but received only one-third of the votes, about 10% less than the national average. On March 23, the local groups of the Free Gymnasts and the KPD were banned as part of the Enabling Act. After the "renewal" of the city council on April 22, only the NSDAP and the BVP were still represented, and Heinrich Graf (NSDAP) became mayor. Four and a half years later, the Ministry of the Interior removed him from office because of a real estate affair. In July 1933, the BVP was also banned.

Five days after the parliamentary elections, the first arrests and house searches took place in Aubing. The Aubinger-Neuaubinger newspaper of March 15, 1933, reported that "8 communists were taken into protective custody" in Aubing and Lochhausen together. Eleven people from Aubing who were imprisoned in the Dachau concentration camp between 1933 and 1944 are known by name. As far as can be ascertained, they were imprisoned for

In the summer of 1933, Neuaubing union secretary and Reichsbanner leader Josef Lampersberger was a courier for the Sopade, the exiled executive of the SPD in Czechoslovakia. Threatened with arrest, he remained in the Czech border region. Through his father of the same name, he made contact with like-minded people and sent them illegal leaflets. One of these contacts was Gustav Körner from Neuaubing, who knew Franz Faltner, the leader of the Munich resistance group known as the "Red Rebels". The group distributed leaflets in Munich until it was exposed in April 1935 and 31 members were arrested, including Körner and Lampersberger's father. The fate of the Lampersbergers is unknown. Körner spent three years in Amberg prison, then in Dachau concentration camp, and finally "on parole" in the 999 penal battalion. He survived.

In November 1938, Jews Moritz and Kurt Bloch were banned from their company and Kurt was sent to Dachau concentration camp. Both later emigrated.

== From 1942: Munich district ==
=== Incorporation ===
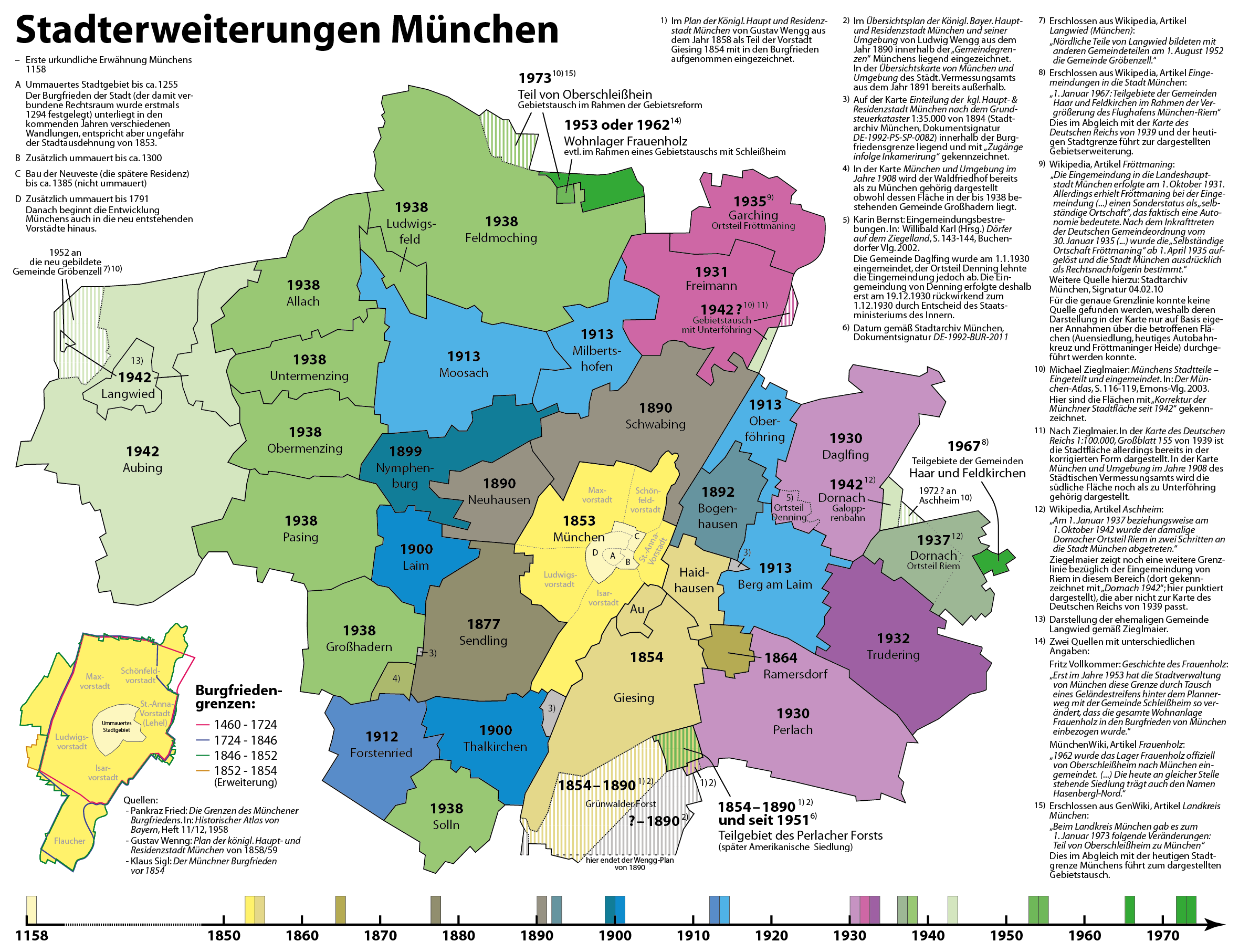
Aubing, the westernmost district, and Langwied to the north of it were the last major areas to be incorporated into Munich in 1942.

After the Nazis seized power in 1933, the government sought to expand the movement's capital. Riem was incorporated in 1936, followed by Feldmoching, Allach, Untermenzing, Obermenzing, Großhadern, Solln, and Pasing in 1938, making Munich and Aubing neighboring communities.

In April 1937, the city of Munich and the community of Aubing began talks about incorporation into Munich. Aubing's representatives were initially open to the idea of incorporation. However, this changed when no agreement could be reached on an incorporation treaty and the majority of Aubing's population was against it. Finally, the Bavarian Reichsstatthalter, Ritter von Epp, decided by decree to incorporate the town on April 1, 1942, without an incorporation treaty. However, it was forbidden to announce the incorporation in the newspaper. After the end of the war, the American administration initially offered to disincorporate the town and restore it to its former status, but the city of Munich prevented this.

=== Second World War ===
Between 1941 and 1945, about 700 forced laborers and prisoners of war were used in Aubing and neighboring Lochhausen. They were housed in seven camps, of which only the Neuaubing prisoner of war camp remains today. Most of the prisoners here were French prisoners of war who worked in the Reichsbahn factory. POWs from a camp in Freiham were used in agriculture. Prisoners from a labor camp in Brunhamstraße and a summer camp in what is now Hohensteinstraße (Neuaubing) worked in the Dornier factory. Another camp was located in Alt-Aubing (Schwemmstraße), where inmates worked in agriculture and as municipal workers. A winter camp was located in Aubing-Ost (today Hellensteinstraße). Besides France, other important countries of origin were Serbia, Croatia, Poland, Russia and Ukraine.

In 1943/44, bombs fell on the Reichsbahn repair shop, the Dornier factory, an anti-aircraft position in the area of today's Neuaubing-West housing development, and an electrical substation in the Aubinger Lohe, causing extensive damage. At least 53 people died. About 400 soldiers from Aubing lost their lives in the war.

On the morning of April 30, 1945, the first soldiers of the 7th US Army arrived in Aubing. The day before, several hundred SS men had moved into Aubing to defend it against the Americans. The inhabitants of Aubing tried in vain to persuade them to leave. A local police lieutenant finally succeeded by giving false information about American troop movements. The situation remained tense. Between May and October, police lieutenant Beckerbauer recorded nine murders, four attempted murders, 90 cases of looting, and 95 cases of street robbery. He also reported that on several occasions former prisoners of war had helped to repel looters.

The school building of today's Limesschule survived the Second World War undamaged and was used as a refugee camp after the end of the war in 1945. The school was reopened in October 1945. Including the former teacher's room and craft room, there were ten rooms where 1010 children were taught in 16 classes with an average of 46 students in shifts in the morning and afternoon.

=== New residential areas ===
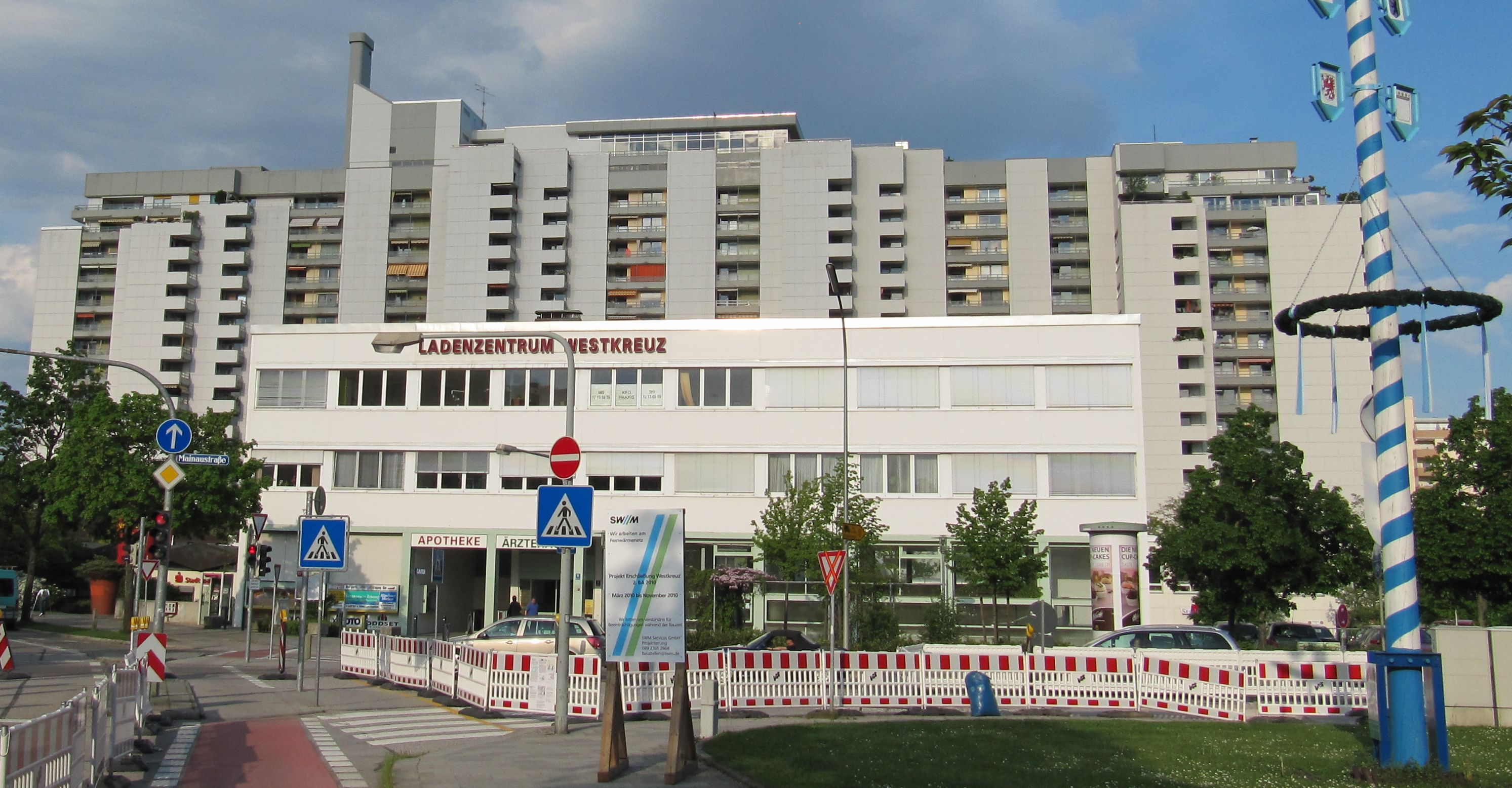
The Ramses in the Am Westkreuz development is the largest building in Aubing. In the foreground is the Westkreuz shopping center.

The settlement of Am Westkreuz is located in the easternmost part of Aubing, south of the Munich - Buchloe railroad line and bordered to the east and south by the Pasing - Herrsching railroad line. Before 1964, there was only one farmhouse in this area, the Kreuzhof, on the site of what is now a playhouse. The first apartments on the new estate were occupied in 1966, with plans for a total of 12,000 residents. The planning company responsible, Südhausbau Ltd., named the estate after a planned road junction nearby, but this was never realized: Gotthardstraße, which today ends in Laim, was to cross Bodenseestraße (Bundesstraße 2) there.

Between 1965 and 1983, housing for about 22,000 residents was built in the two housing developments Am Westkreuz and Neuaubing-West.

The first concrete plans for a new district of Freiham on the fields west of Neuaubing were made in 1963, but construction did not begin until the 21st century (see Freiham).

When Munich's districts were reorganized in 1992, the district of Aubing (39) was merged with the district of Lochhausen-Langwied (40) to form the joint district of Aubing-Lochhausen-Langwied (22). Since then, Aubing is no longer an independent municipality.

== Development of the population ==
Population development of Aubing (green) and district 22 (yellow) between 1900 and 2008

The number of graves indicates that the population of the terraced cemetery was approximately 200 individuals during the period of its use, which lasted until around 700. In 1240, the so-called 1st ducal urbarium (an urbarium is a list of property rights) listed 19 farms owned by the sovereign for Aubing (other properties were not counted), representing approximately 30% of the sovereign farms in the Dachau caste office. In 1530, Aubing had a population of just over 400, making it one of the largest villages in the district court of Dachau. Following the devastation of the Thirty Years' War, this population figure was not surpassed until the 18th century. In 1810, the census recorded a population of 479 inhabitants, 165 children, and 114 servants, for a total of 758 individuals.

A census conducted in 1900 revealed a population of 1,431 inhabitants. In the subsequent census conducted five years after the opening of the Central Railway Workshop, the population had increased to 2,644, including 168 Protestants. Between the two world wars, the population more than doubled again, from 3,928 in 1925 to 9,443 in 1939.

Following its incorporation in 1942, the population of the area grew at a relatively slow pace, reaching 13,094 by the 1960s. However, the 1970 census revealed a significant increase in the number of residents, with the new settlements of Am Westkreuz and Neuaubing-West contributing to a substantial growth in population. In just ten years, the population had increased to over 27,000, a figure that was more than double the previous census count. From 1950 to 1970, the population was recorded separately for the "Aubing" and "Neuaubing" districts, which were located north and south of the Munich-Buchloe railroad line, respectively. These figures corroborate the notion that the substantial population growth is largely concentrated in the "Neuaubing" district, where the population increased from 7,557 in 1950 to 8,707 in 1961 and 22,436 in 1970. In contrast, the "Aubing" district exhibited a relatively modest increase, from 3,748 to 4,606 inhabitants over the same period.

The 1987 census revealed a population of 30,181 for the entire municipality of Aubing, representing a 10% increase over the previous 17 years. Following the merger of the districts of Aubing (39) and Lochhausen-Langwied (40) in 1992 to form the joint district of Aubing-Lochhausen-Langwied (22), the figures were only reported collectively. Consequently, the former Lochhausen-Langwied figures are also required for the comparison.

In the smaller Lochhausen-Langwied district, the 1987 census enumerated a population of 5,369. Five years before their unification, the two districts collectively had 35,550 inhabitants.

The City of Munich has published various reports on the subject, which present slightly different figures for the same census. According to another source, the combined population in the 1987 census was 37,421. The latest update of the statistics showed 37,425 inhabitants for the combined district on December 31, 2000, and 38,327 on December 31, 2008.

Population figures for Aubing in comparison
Year	Aubing	Lochhausen- Langwied	Aubing- Lochhausen- Langwied	Munich
700	≈200			
1530	≈400			
1810	758			
1900	1,431			
1910	2,644			
1925	3,928			
1933	5,789			
1939	9,443			
1950	11,305	4,553	15,858	831,937
1956	12,146	3,658	15,804	962,860
1961	13,049	4,200	17,249	1,085,014
1970	27,403	4,336	31,739	1,314,518
1987	30,181	5,369	35,550	1,242,818
2000			37,425	1,247,934
2008			38,327	1,367,314
2014			42,859	1,490,681
2019			49,072	1,560,042

== Confrontation with history ==
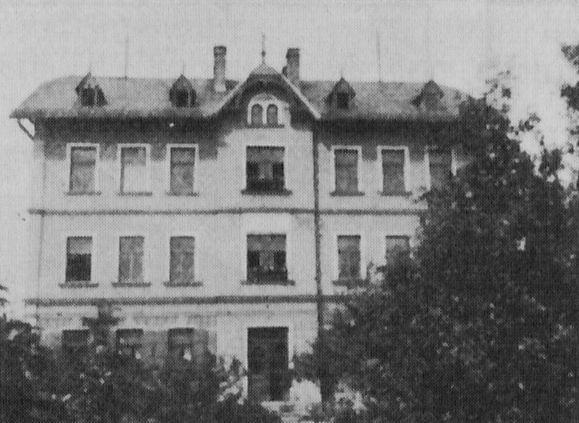
The school building from 1893, one of the illustrations from "Aubing Parish Village near Munich" by Steinbacher

In 1905, Josef Steinbacher, a native of the Upper Palatinate, assumed the role of "teacher, choir director, and sacristan" in Aindling. Before his death in Aubing in 1922, he also became the parish secretary and the founder of an association. In 1914, he published his 144-page booklet, "Aubing Pfarrdorf bei München," which provides a comprehensive account of the history and development of the village. The first major treatise to deal with the history of Aubing, "How it came about, how it was and how it is", was published in 1914. In the foreword, Steinbacher expressed his concerns about the rural exodus in the "Bavarian fatherland" at the time and finally his hope and motivation: "Through knowledge of our homeland, we will then also regain a love of our homeland."

Steinbacher made further extensive records. A first revision was published in 1929 by his successor, teacher Moser, in the magazine Altheimatland. The original manuscripts were discovered in 1980 in the estate of one of his daughters in nearby Planegg. As a result, the Aubing Parish Church Foundation published Steinbacher's History of the 99 Houses of Aubing in 1981. In 1983, the foundation published a reprint of Steinbacher's initial publication. In 2003, the Aubing Archive released a five-volume work titled Chronica Aubingensis, which was authored by Steinbacher. Collectively, Steinbacher's writings serve as a valuable source of information for local history. In 1982, a street in Aubing was named after him.

=== Aubing archive ===
In 1992, the district committee of the Aubing-Lochhausen-Langwied district organized a photo competition on Aubing's past to mark the 50th anniversary of its incorporation. Both the competition and the accompanying exhibition, "From village to town - 50 years of Aubing in Munich," which was held in April 1992, were well received. In July 1993, the organizers took this opportunity to found the Aubing Archive, which since then has been dedicated to "collecting and archiving historical and contemporary documents on the subject of Aubing and Neuaubing." Between 1995 and 2006, the archive published about two dozen publications, which are available on the website.

=== 1000 years of documentary mention ===
Just in time for the 1000th anniversary of the first documentary mention of Aubing in 2010, the Association 1000 Years Charter of Aubing e.V. was founded in 2008 to "organize the festival year 2010 with its own contributions and to coordinate the supporting program". Among the numerous events during the celebration year were an exhibition in April/May 2010 entitled "From the beginnings to the beginning of the 19th century" and another in September 2010, which covered the period from secularization to after the Second World War. The first exhibition presented some of the archaeological finds from the terraced cemetery in Aubing to the public for the first time. The second exhibition was organized by members of the Aubing Archives.

== Bibliography ==
- Association for the Promotion of 1000 Years of Aubing (ed.): 1000 Jahre Aubing. Vom mittelalterlichen Dorf zum Teil einer Großstadt. Association for the Promotion of 1000 Years of Aubing, Munich 2010, ISBN 978-3-00-030204-6.
- Publication series of the Aubing Archive (website), including in particular:
- Josef Feneberg: Die ettalische Hofmark Aubing. In: Aubing Archive e. V. (Ed.): Heinrich von Aubing – Aubing in der Zeit der Grund- und Rechtsherrschaft Ettals. Munich 2003, p. 41–176.
- Hermann Dannheimer: Das baiuwarische Reihengräberfeld von Aubing, Stadt München. In: Staatssammlung München. Monographien der Prähistorischen Staatssammlung München, Band 1. Konrad Theiss Publisher, Stuttgart 1998.
- Fünfundsiebzig Jahre Bundesbahn-Ausbesserungswerk München-Neuaubing. Eisenbahn-Kurier Publisher. Freiburg im Breisgau 1981, ISBN 3-88255-800-8.
