= List of Alsace–Lorraine locomotives =

This list covers the locomotives of the Imperial Railways in Alsace–Lorraine (Reich railways in Alsace-Lorraine) (EL) and those of the Chemins de fer d'Alsace et de Lorraine (AL). Alsace–Lorraine is a region in northeastern France that was under the control of the German Empire between 1871 and 1920, during which time its railway network was expanded and operated by the EL.

== Locomotive classification and numbering ==
The Reich railways in Alsace–Lorraine numbered their locomotives sequentially and gave them names as well. The names depended on the type of locomotive.

In addition the locomotive fleet was organised into classes from the outset. The system was based on the Bavarian state railways with capital letters followed by Arabic numerals.

- A – Express and passenger train locomotives (named after rivers)
- B – Locomotives for mixed traffic (named after rivers)
- C – Goods train locomotives (named after towns and villages)
- D – Tank locomotives (named after people, forenames)
- E – Narrow gauge locomotives (unnamed)

A class number was issued to each delivery batch.

In 1906 all the vehicles were renumbered and a new classification system was introduced, this time based on the Prussian system. The different types of locomotive were given a specific range of numbers.

- S – Express train locomotives (numbers 1–500)
- P – Passenger train locomotives (numbers 501–1000)
- G – Goods train locomotives (numbers 1001–2000)
- T – Tank locomotives (numbers 2001–2600)

In 1912 the locomotives were again given new numbers and in some cases were reclassified. In addition, locomotive names were done away with.

- S – Express train locomotives (numbers 1–2000)
- P – Passenger train locomotives (numbers 2001–3000)
- G – Goods train locomotives (numbers 3001–6000)
- T – Tank locomotives (numbers 6001–9000)

Narrow gauge locomotives were given the class letter ‘’’T’’’ and number range 3001–3042. This meant that two engines could have the same number. Older locomotives were no longer renumbered and retained their number until retirement.

In 1919 the French regional railway, “Chemins de fer d' Alsace et de Lorraine“ (AL) took over the system and continued with it until 1938, when the company went into the French national railways, the SNCF.

== Steam locomotives ==
=== Passenger and express train locomotives ===
Original class	Original number(s)	1906 class	1906 number(s)	1912 class	1912 number(s)	DRG/SNCF number(s)	Quantity	Manufacturer Serial numbers	Year(s) made	Year(s) withdrawn	Axle arrangement (UIC)	Remarks
A 1	1–2	—	—	—	—	–	2	Carels Frères	1871	1900–1904	1B n2	
A 2	3–17	P 2	536–548	—	—	–	15	Strousberg	1870	1912	1B n2	
A 3	18–25	P 2	549–550	–	–	–	8	Sigl	1870	by 1907	1B n2	
A 4	26–29	—	—	—	—	—	4	Vulcan Foundry	1866	by 1900	1B n2	Acquired 1871 from VF; ordered by Somerset and Dorset Railway (21–24), but not delivered.
A 5	42–51	P 2	551–556	P 2	555	—	10	Koechlin	1872	by 1913	1B n2	
A 6	52–57	P 2	557–561	P 2	509	_	6	Grafenstaden	1872	by 1920	1B n2	
A 7	195–226	P 3	562–593	P 2	562...593	—	32	EMBG Mülhausen	1873	1911–1918	1B n2	
A 8	227–242	P 3	594–609	P 2	594...606	—	16	Kitson & Co.	1874	1910–1922	1B n2	
A 9	425–450	P 3	610–634	P 2	610...634	—	26	Esslingen	1874–1875	1907–1925	1B n2	
A 10	571	P 4	636	P 3	1601	—	1	Grafenstaden	1892	1918	2′B n2v	
A 11	572–579	P 4	637–644	P 3	1602–1609	—	8	Grafenstaden	1894	1915–1924	2′B n2	
A 12	580–585	S 1	1–6	P 4	1901–1906	—	6	Henschel	1895	1920	2′B n2v	
A 13	603–618	S 1	7–22	P 4	1907–1922	—	16	Grafenstaden	1897	1920–1926	2′B n2v	
A 14	630–634	P 5	701–705	P 5	2001–2005	—	5	Grafenstaden	1898	1921	2′C n4v	
A 15	712–717	S 2	23–28	S 3	201–206	—	6	Grafenstaden	1900	by 1925	2′B n2v	Same as Prussian S 3
A 16	718–727; 763–776; 783–787	S 2	29–57	S 3	207–235	—	29	Hanomag; Schwartzkopff; Union Gießerei; Henschel; Vulcan	1900–1901	1921–1925	2′B n2v	Same as Prussian S 3
A 16	777–782	S 2	58–63	S 3 and S 4	236–240, 401	—	6	Borsig	1900	1921–1925	2′B h2	Same as Prussian S 3 and S 4 (no. 63/401)
A 17	838–843; 871–887; 909–915	S 4	201–230	P 7	2301–2330	SNCF 230 C 301 – 330; CFL 3801–3804, 3811	30	Grafenstaden	1902–1903	by 1949	2′C n4v	
A 18	844–864; 916–938; 987–992	S 3	101–150	S 5	501–554	—	54	Grafenstaden	1902–1913	by 1937	2′B n4v	Same as Prussian S 5^{1}
B 1	30–41	P 1	501–512	P 1	101–102	—	12	Strousberg	1870	by 1918	B1 n2	
B 2	243–257	P 1	531–521	—	—	—	15	Egestorft	1873	by 1912	B1 n2	
B 3	258–267	P 1	522–531	P 1	103	—	10	Kitson & Co.	1874	by 1914	B1 n2	
B 4	347–350	P 1	532–535	—	—	—	4	Strousberg	1870	1910	B1 n2	Ex Bavarian B IX 503–506
B 5	101–104	—	—	—	—	—	4	Kessler	1859–1863	by 1878	2′B n2	ex-Württemberg E (old);
—	—	S 5	251–330	S 9	901–980	SNCF 230 D 901 – 980	80	Grafenstaden; Henschel	1906–1909	by 1956	2′C n4v	
—	—	S 6	401–408	S 12	1301–1308	SNCF 231 A 301 – 308	8	Grafenstaden	1909	by 1950	2′C1′ h4v	
—	—	—	—	S 10^{1}	1101–1122	SNCF 230 G 101 – 122	22	Henschel	1912–1916	by 1957	2′C h4v	Same as Prussian S 10^{1}, incl. 5 reparation locos
—	—	—	—	S 9	981	—	1	Hartmann	1914	1925	2′C h4v	Reparation; Saxon XII HV
—	—	—	—	S 9	982–986	—	5	J. A. Maffei	1903–1907	by 1925	2′C n4v	Reparation; Bavarian S 3/5
KPEV	—	—	—	S 10	1150–1162	SNCF 230 H 157–161	13	Schwartzkopff; Vulcan; Hanomag	1910–1914	by 1951	2′C h4	Reparation; Prussian S 10
—	—	—	—	P 7	2331–2335	—	5	J. A. Maffei	1905–1907	by 1924	2′C n4v	Reparation; Bavarian P 3/5 N
KPEV	—	—	—	P 8	2350–2374	230 F 352 – 374	25	(various)	1909–1918	by 1966	2′C h2	Reparation; Prussian P 8
KPEV	—	—	—	S 7	700	—	1	Hanomag	1905	1926	2′B1′ h4v	Reparation; Prussian S 7
—	—	—	—	S 14	1311–1370	SNCF 231 B 311 – 370	60	Fives-Lille; Batignolles-Châtillon	1922	by 1957	2′C1′ h4v	Identical to État 231–500, ex. PO 3661–3680
—	—	—	—	S 16	1401–1402	SNCF 231 D 1 – 2	1	SACM Grafenstaden	1933	1947	2′C1′ h2	

=== Goods train locomotives ===
Original class	Original number(s)	1906 class	1906 number(s)	1912 class	1912 number(s)	DRG/SNCF number(s)	Quantity	Manufacturer Serial numbers	Year(s) made	Year(s) withdrawn	Axle arrangement (UIC)	Remarks
C 1	58–61	—	—	—	—	—	4	Wiener Neustadt	1870	by 1906	C n2	Ex MÁV 45–48
C 2	62–73	G 1	1001–1012	G 1	1002...1011	—	12	Wiener Neustadt	1871	1910–1923	C n2	
C 3	74–77	G 1	1013–1016	—	—	—	4	Wiener Neustadt	1870	1910–1911	C n2	
C 4	778–81	G 2	1040–1042	—	—	—	4	Strousberg	1870	1908–1909	C n2	
C 5	82–96	G 2	1043–1047	—	—	—	15	Grafenstaden	1871	by 1909	C n2	
C 6	97–100	G 2	1048	—	—	—	4	Schwartzkopff	1870	by 1908	C n2	
C 7	105–124	G 2	1049–1068	G 2	1049...1068	—	20	Wöhlert	1872	by 1932	C n2	
C 8	125–134	G 2	1069–1077	G 2	1073–1074	—	10	MBG	1871	by 1915	C n2	
C 9	135–144	G 2	1078–1087	—	—	—	10	Schwartzkopff	1872	1909–1911	C n2	
C 10	145–164	G 2	1088–1107	G 2	1088–1100, 1251–1256	—	20	Vulcan	1872	1911–1928	C n2	
C 11	268–279, 343	G 2	1108–1120	G 2	1257–1258	—	13	G. Egestorft	1873–1874	1910–1920	C n2	
C 12	280–297	G 2	1121–1138	G 2	1259–1263	—	18	Grafenstaden	1873	1912–1925	C n2	
C 13	298–309	G 2	1139–1150	G 2	1264–1267	—	12	MBG	1873	by 1925	C n2	
C 14	310–315	G 1	1017–1022	G 1	1017–1019	—	6	Floridsdorf	1872	by 1921	C n2	
C 15	316–332	G 1	1023–1039	G 1	1024...1039	—	17	Wiener Neustadt	1873	by 1925	C n2	
C 16	333–334	—	—	—	—	—	2	Schwartzkopff	1872	by 1900	C n2	
C 17	335–340	G 2	1151–1155	G 2	1152–1153	—	6	Carels Frères	1873	by 1913	C n2	
C 18	344–346	G 2	1156–1157	—	—	—	3	J. A. Maffei	1872	by 1910	C n2	
C 19	371–410	G 2	1158–1197	G 2	1269–1281	—	40	Henschel	1874–1875	by 1921	C n2	
C 20	411–424	G 2	1198–1211	G 2	1282–1291	—	14	Grafenstaden	1874	by 1932	C n2	
C 21	468–479	G 3	1212–1223	G 3	1212...1223	—	12	Esslingen	1882	by 1924	C n2	Same as Prussian G 3 with outside valve gear
C 22	480–491	G 3	1224–1235	G 3	1224...1235	—	12	Esslingen	1883	by 1924	C n2	Same as Prussian G 3 with outside valve gear
C 23	517–523	G 3	1236–1242	G 3	1236...1242	—	7	Grafenstaden	1885	by 1924	C n2	Same as Prussian G 3 with outside valve gear
C 24	565–570	G 3	1243–1248	G 3	1243–1248	—	6	Grafenstaden	1892	by 1924	C n2	Same as Prussian G 3 with outside valve gear
C 25	586–593	G 4	1249–1256	G 4	3801–3808	—	8	Grafenstaden	1895	by 1932	C n2v	
C 26	594–602	G 4	1257–1265	G 4	3809–3817	SNCF 030 C 810	9	Henschel	1896	by 1948	C n2v	
C 27	635–653	G 4	1266–1284	G 4	3818–3836	—	19	Henschel	1898	by 1932	C n2v	
C 28	654–663; 694–701	G 4^{1}	1285–1302	G 4^{1}	3837–3854	—	18	Grafenstaden	1899–1900	by 1932	C n2v	Same as Prussian G 4^{2}
C 29	702–711; 751–762	G 5^{2}	1401–1422	G 5^{2}	4001–4022	DRG 54 324	22	Grafenstaden; Borsig	1900–1901	by 1937	1′C n2v	Same as Prussian G 5^{2}
C 30	728–750; 865–867; 939–943; 979–986	G 4	1303–1341	G 4	3855–3893	DRG 53 025	39	Hohenzollern; Hanomag; Grafenstaden	1900–1904	by 1932	C n2v	Same as Prussian G 4^{2}
C 31	788–813	G 5^{2}	1423–1448	G 5^{2}	4023–4048	DRG 54 343–344, 54 353	26	Hanomag; Henschel; Schwartzkopff; Schichau	1901	by 1938	1′C n2v	Same as Prussian G 5^{2}
C 32	898–908; 961–975; 1023–1088	G 5^{2}	1449–1615	G 5^{2}	4049–4215	DRG 54 368–386, 54 708–717; SNCF 130 C 61 – 215; CFL 3601/11–36; PKP Tg2-60–61/64–67/69/70/73	167	Schwartzkopff; Hartmann; Grafenstaden; Henschel; Humboldt	1900–1907	by 1955	1′C n2v	Same as Prussian G 5^{2}
C 33	996–1000; 1098–1102	G 8	1801–1847	G 11	5501–5547	—	47	Grafenstaden	1905–1910	by 1929	1′E n4v	
—	—	—	—	G 5^{5}	4271–4273	SNCF 130 C 273	3	Grafenstaden	1912	by 1938	1′C n2v	Same as Prussian G 5^{5}
—	—	—	—	G 8^{1}	5001–5138, 5151–5278, 5301–5321	DRG 55 2946, 55 3338–3340, 55 4275–4279, 55 4285; SNCF 040 D 151 – 287	171	(various)	1913–1919	by 1966	D h2	Same as Prussian G 8^{1}, including reparations
—	—	G 9	1901–1906	G 10	5401–5435, 5436–5455	DRG 57 1124; SNCF 050 B 401 – 455	55	Henschel; Grafenstaden; Borsig; Hanomag; Esslingen	1910–1913	by 1955	E h2	Same as Prussian G 10, including reparations
—	—	—	—	G 12	5563–5689	SNCF 150 C 563 – 680	127	Henschel; Grafenstaden	1917–1920	by 1957	1′E h3	Same as Prussian G 12, including reparations
—	—	—	—	G 12^{1}	5551–5562	SNCF 150 B 551 – 652	12	Henschel	1915	by 1955	1′E h3	Same as Prussian G 12^{1}; and Est 5101–5105
KPEV	—	—	—	G 5^{1}	3994–4000	—	7	(various)	1893–1901	unknown	1′C n2	Reparation; Prussian G 5^{1}
KPEV	—	—	—	G 5^{2}	4219–4240	—	22	(various)	1896–1901	by 1939	1′C n2	Reparation; Prussian G 5^{2}
—	—	—	—	G 5^{3}	4241–4245	—	5	Hanomag; Humboldt	1903	by 1934	1′C n2	Reparation; Prussian G 5^{3}
—	—	—	—	G 5^{4}	4251–4267	SNCF 130 C 252 / 265	17	(various)	1902–1909	by 1955	1′C n2	Reparation; Prussian G 5^{4}
—	—	—	—	P 6	2100–2102	—	3	Humboldt; Henschel; Hanomag	1908–1909	by 1926	1′C n2	Reparation; Prussian P 6
—	—	—	—	G 7^{1}	4301–4320	SNCF 040 B 301 – 313	20	(various)	1899–1916	by 1955	D n2	Reparation; Prussian G 7^{1}
—	—	—	—	G 7^{2}	4321–4351	SNCF 040 B 321–351	31	(various)	1895–1916	by 1955	D n2v	Reparation; Prussian G 7^{2}
—	—	—	—	G 8	5380–5393	—	13	(various)	1907–1913	by 1934	D h2	Reparation; Prussian G 8
—	—	—	—	G 14	5701–5761, 5801–5822	SNCF 140 B 701 – 822	83	Baldwin	1918	by 1955	1′D h2	USATC "Pershing" and USATC "Slad"
—	—	—	—	G 16	5901–5902	SNCF 151 A 901 – 902	2	SACM Grafenstaden	1936–1937	by 1945	1′E1′ h3	

=== Tank locomotives ===
Original class	Original number(s)	1906 class	1906 number(s)	1912 class	1912 number(s)	DRG/SNCF number(s)	Quantity	Manufacturer Serial numbers	Year(s) made	Year(s) withdrawn	Axle arrangement (UIC)	Remarks
D 1	165–172	T 3	2045–2051	—	—	—	8	Tubize	1871	by 1909	C n2t	
D 2	173–175	T 3	2052–2053	—	—	—	3	Grafenstaden	1870	by 1909	C n2t	
D 3	176–179	—	—	—	—	—	4	Wöhlert	1872	by 1902	B n2t	
D 4	180–194	T 2	2013–2027	T 2	2014...2025	—	15	MBG	1874	1910–1919	1′B n2t	
D 5	341–342; 351–354	T 4	2114–2119	T 4	2114...2119	—	6	Schwartzkopff	1874	1911–1915	B1 n2t	
D 6	355–366	T 2	2032–2043	T 2	2032...2043	—	12	MBG	1874	1908–1921	1′B n2t	
D 7 (MBG)	367–370	T 2	2028–2031	T 2	2028–2030	—	4	MBG	1874	1910–1921	1′B n2t	
D 7 (Vulcan)	451	T 2.1	2044	—	—	—	1	Vulcan	1876	1909	C n2t	Pontoon locomotive "Fasolt" with friction roller drive
D 8	452–455	T 1	2001–2004	T 1	2002–2004	—	4	Grafenstaden	1879	1908–1920	B n2t	
D 9	456–457	T 1	2005–2006	T 1	2005–2006	—	2	Grafenstaden	1880	1912–1920	B n2t	
D 10	458	T 1	2007	—	—	—	1	Grafenstaden	1880	1910	B n2t	
D 11	459	T 3	2054	—	—	—	1	Grafenstaden	1880	1910	C n2t	
D 12	460	T 1	2008	—	—	—	1	Henschel	1880	1909	B n2t	
D 13	461–462	T 1	2009–2010	T 1	2010	—	2	Henschel	1881	1910–1913	B n2t	
D 14	463–464	T 1	2011–2012	T 1	2011–2012	—	2	Henschel	1881	1912–1913	B n2t	
D 15	465	T 3	2055	T 3	2055	—	1	Krauss	1881	1913	C n2t	
D 16	466–467	T 3	2056–2057	T 3	2056–2057	—	2	Esslingen	1882	1913–1914	C n2t	
D 17	492–495	T 4	2120–2123	—	—	—	4	Schichau	1882	1911	1B n2t	
D 18	496–507	T 4	2124–2135	T 4	2124...2135	—	12	J. A. Maffei	1883	1910–1921	1B n2t	
D 19	508–513	T 3	2058–2063	—	—	—	6	J. A. Maffei	1884	1911	C n2t	
D 20	514–516	T 4	2136–2138	T 4	2136	—	3	Grafenstaden	1884	1911–1915	1B n2t	
D 21	524–526	T 4	2139–2141	T 4	2139–2141	—	3	Henschel	1885	1921–1930	1B n2t	
D 22	527–532	T 3	2064–2069	T 3	2064–2069	SNCF 030 TA 66	6	Henschel	1886	1913–1941	C n2t	
D 23	533–535	T 4	2142–2144	T 4	2142–2144	—	3	Henschel	1886	1920–1937	1B n2t	
D 24	536–537	T 5	2145–2146	T 5	2145–2146	—	2	Henschel	1887	1930	1B n2t, 1B n2vt	Rebuilt in 1901 into 1′B1′
D 25	538–540	T 3	2070–2072	T 3	2070–2072	—	3	Grafenstaden	1888	1921–1933	C n2t	
D 26	551–564	T 3	2073–2086	T 3	6101–6114	—	14	Grafenstaden	1891	1917–1934	C n2t	
D 27	619–629	T 3	2087–2097	T 3	6115–6125	SNCF 030 TB 125	11	Grafenstaden	1897	1918–1958	C n2t	
D 28	664–673	T 6	2147–2156	T 4	6401–6410	—	10	Henschel	1899	1917–1933	1′B n2t	Same as Prussian T 4^{1}
D 29	674–677	T 3	2098–2101	T 3	6126–6129		4	Grafenstaden	1899	1918–1929	C n2t	
D 30	682–693	T 3	2102–2113	T 3	6130–6141	SNCF 030 TB 130, 030 TB 134	12	Grafenstaden	1900	1918–1958	C n2t	
D 31	814–837; 944–960; 1001–1012; 1089–1097	T 8	2301–2427	T 9^{3}	7051–7193	DRG 91 303–305, 91 544/656/745/1245/1694; SNCF 130 TA 51–191; CFL 30.01–30.03, 30.11–30.14	142	Henschel; Union Gießerei; Krauss (Munich); Humboldt; Grafenstaden; Orenstein & Koppel; Arn. Jung; Hanomag	1901–1913		1′C n2t	Same as Prussian T 9^{3}, including reparations
D 32	888–897; 993–995	T 7	2201–2237	T 5	6601–6637	DRG 73 125; SNCF 122 TA 602 – 637	37	Krauss (Munich); Grafenstaden; 6401–6414	1903–1911	1932–1953	1′B2′ n2t	Same as Bavarian D XII
D 33	1013–1022	T 9	2501–2566	T 17	8301–8366	SNCF 232 TB 301 – 366	66	Grafenstaden; Humboldt	1905–1913	by 1954	2′C2′ n4vt	
—	—	—	—	T 3	6142–6144	—	3	Grafenstaden	1913	1933	C n2t	
—	—	T 10	2601–2614	T 12	7701–7729	DRG 74 784–786, 74 1254; SNCF 130 TB 703 – 729	29	Grafenstaden; Borsig; Hohenzollern	1910–1914	by 1952	1′C h2t	Same as Prussian T 12, including reparations
—	—	—	—	T 13	7901–7965	DRG 92 732–738; SNCF 040 TC 902 – 964	65	Grafenstaden; Hohenzollern; Hagans; Union Gießerei	1914–1918	by 1955	D n2t	Same as Prussian T 13, including reparations
—	—	—	—	T 14	8501–8556	DRG 93 094, 93 188–191, 93 237; SNCF 141 TA 501 – 540	56	Henschel; Hanomag; Hohenzollern; Union Gießerei	1915–1918	by 1959	1′D1′ h2t	Same as Prussian T 14, including reparations
—	—	—	—	T 16	8101–8112	DRG 94 462–464; SNCF 050 TA 101 – 112	12	Grafenstaden	1913	by 1955	E h2t	Same as Prussian T 16
—	—	—	—	T 16^{1}	8113–8118	DRG 94 462–464/467, 94 1378–1379; SNCF 050 TA 113 – 118	6	Grafenstaden	1914	by 1955	E h2t	Same as Prussian T 16^{1}
—	—	—	—	T 18	8401–8427	DRG 78 093; SNCF 232 TC 401–427	27	Vulcan; Grafenstaden	1915–1918	by 1966	2′C2′ h2t	Same as Prussian T 18
—	—	—	—	T 19	8201–8213	SNCF 151 TB 201 – 213	13		1905–1910	by 1951	1′E1′ h2t	Rebuilt from EL G 11
—	—	—	—	T 20	8601–8630	SNCF 242 TA 601 – 630	30	Batignolles–Châtillon; SACM Grafenstaden	1929–1930	by 1967	2′D2′ h2vt	
T 9^{1}	KPEV 7214	—	—	T 9^{1}	7188	—	1	Hohenzollern	1897	1933	C1′ n2t	Reparation Prussian T 9^{1}
T 11	KPEV 7512, 7508	—	—	T 11	7300–7301	—	2	Vulcan; Union Gießerei	1904–1905	1933	1′C n2t	Reparation Prussian T 11

=== Narrow gauge locomotives ===
The narrow gauge locomotives of the Reich railways were built for the metre gauge lines of Lützelburg–Drulingen/Pfalzburg, Colmar–Ensisheim and Colmar–Markolsheim.

Original class	Original number(s)	1906 class	1906 number(s)	1912 class	1912 number(s)	DRG/SNCF number(s)	Quantity	Manufacturer Serial numbers	Year(s) made	Year(s) withdrawn	Axle arrangement (UIC)	Remarks
E 1	541–543	T 21	3011–3013	T 31	1–3		3	Krauss (Munich)	1890	by 1925	C n2t	
E 2	7	T 20	3001				1	Krauss (Munich)	1885	1920	B n2t	Tram locomotive
E 3	547–549	T 20	3002–3004				3	SLM	1883	1910–1933	B n2t	
E 4	565	T 21	3014	T 31	4		1	Grafenstaden	1891	by 1925	C n2t	
E 5	678–681	T 21	3015–3018	T 31	5–8		4	Krauss (Munich)	1899	by 1925	C n2t	
E 6	868–870; 976–978	T 22	3031–3042	T 37	111–123	SNCF 040 TB 111 – 123	13	Hagans	1903–1913	by 1953	D n2t	Metre gauge

== See also ==
- History of rail transport in France
- History of rail transport in Germany
- Länderbahnen
- Alsace–Lorraine
- UIC classification
