= Alsace-Lorraine P 1 =

The Imperial German railways (Reichseisenbahnen) allocated various steam locomotives in Alsace-Lorraine to the P 1 class of engines as follows:

Classification system from 1906/1912

- Alsace-Lorraine B 1
- Alsace-Lorraine B 2
- Alsace-Lorraine B 3
- Alsace-Lorraine B 4

== See also ==
- Imperial Railways in Alsace-Lorraine
- List of Alsace-Lorraine locomotives
