= Class 54 =

Class 54 may refer to:

- A German goods train locomotive class with a 2-6-0 wheel arrangement operated by the Deutsche Reichsbahn which comprised the:
  - Class 54.0: Prussian G 5.1
  - Class 54.0^{II}: BBÖ 60, PKP Class Ti12, PKP Class Ti16, JDŽ 131
  - Class 54.1: BBÖ 260, PKP Class Ti11, ČSD Class 333.1
  - Class 54.2-3: Prussian G 5.2
  - Class 54.2-3^{II}: BBÖ 360
  - Class 54.4: BBÖ 460
  - Class 54.5: ČSD Class 344.3
  - Class 54.6: Prussian G 5.3
  - Class 54.6^{II}: PKP Class Ti1, PKP Class Ti3, JDŽ 128
  - Class 54.7: PKP Class Ti2
  - Class 54.8-12: Prussian G 5.4
  - Class 54.10: Prussian G 5.5
  - Class 54.12: Mecklenburg G 5.4
  - Class 54.13: Bavarian C VI
  - Class 54.14: Bavarian G 3/4 N
  - Class 54.15-17: Bavarian G 3/4 H
