= Prussian G 8.1 =

Class of 5155 German 0-8-0 locomotives

G 8.1 (Prussia, Mecklenburg, Alsace-Lorraine) DRG Class 55.25–56, 55.58 DB Class 055 PKP Tp4 SNCB Type 81 SJ Class G
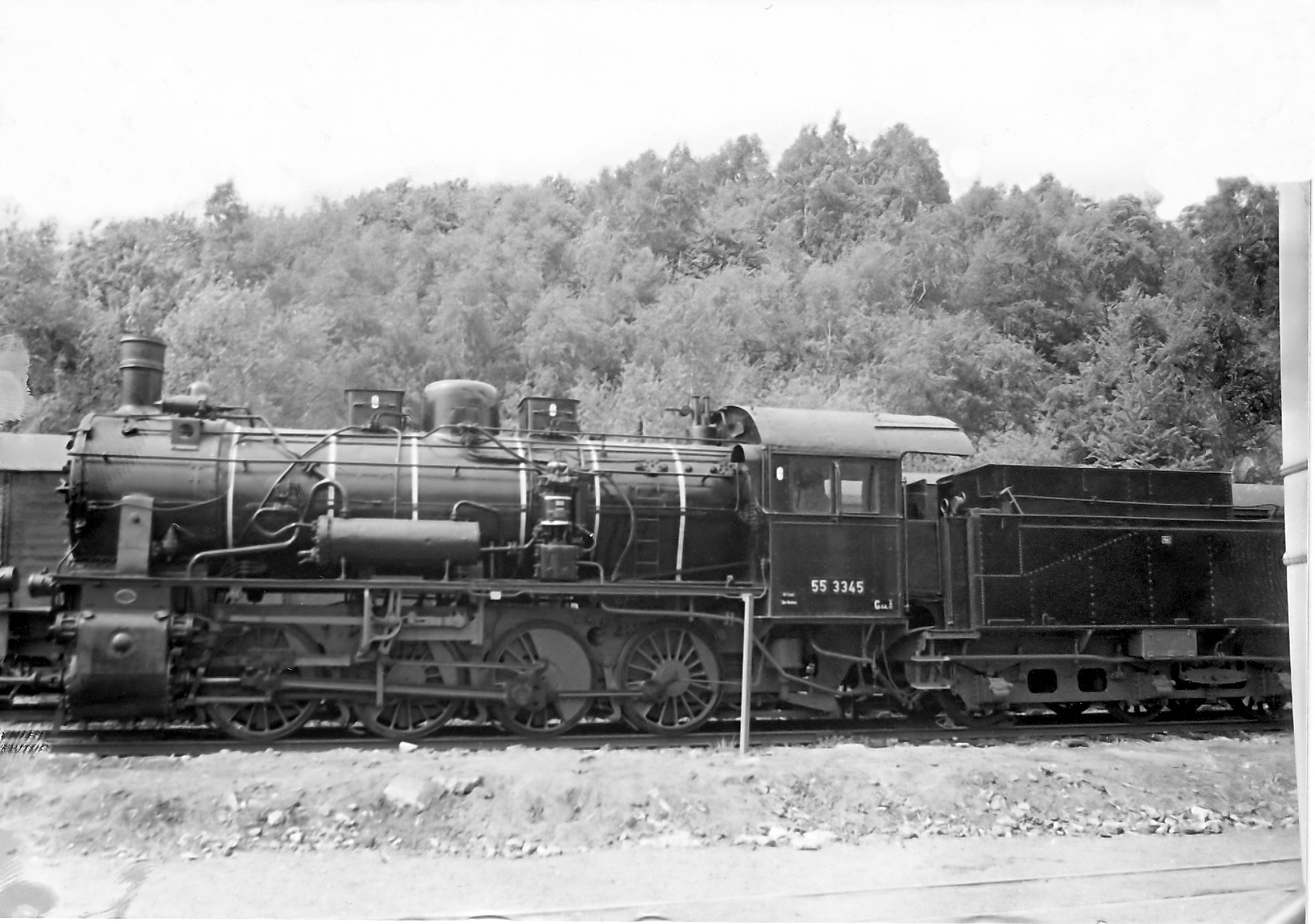
Type and origin
- Builder: Berliner Maschinenbau; Borsig; Grafenstaden; Maschinenfabrik Christian Hagans; Hanomag; Henschel & Sohn; Hohenzollern; Humboldt; Arnold Jung Lokomotivfabrik; Linke-Hofmann; Orenstein & Koppel; Schichau-Werke; AG Vulcan Stettin
- Build date: 1913–1921
- Total produced: 5,155
Specifications
- Gauge: 1,435 mm (4 ft 8 1/2 in) standard gauge
- Driver dia.: 1,350 mm (53.15 in)
- Length
  - Over beams: 18,290 mm (60 ft 1/8 in)
- Axle load: 17.6 t (17.3 long tons; 19.4 short tons)
- Adhesive weight: 69.9 t (68.8 long tons; 77.1 short tons)
- Service weight: 69.9 t (68.8 long tons; 77.1 short tons)
- Water cap.: 16.5 m^{3} (580 cu ft)/20.0 m^{3} (710 cu ft)/21.5 m^{3} (760 cu ft)
- Boiler pressure: 14 bar (1,400 kPa; 200 psi)
- Heating surface
  - Firebox: 2.58 m^{2} (27.8 sq ft)
  - Evaporative: 143.28 m^{2} (1,542.3 sq ft)
- Cylinders: 2
- Cylinder size: 600 mm (23.62 in)
- Piston stroke: 660 mm (25.98 in)
Performance figures
- Maximum speed: 55 km/h (34 mph)
- Indicated power: 927 kW (1,243 hp)
Career
- Numbers: DRG 55 2501–3366, 3368–5665, 5801–5810, 5851–5852; DR 55 5898, 7251–7260, 8170
- Retired: 1973

The Prussian G 8.1 was a steam locomotive operated by the Prussian state railways. It was a heavier, stronger development of the G 8 and was initially referred to as a 'strengthened standard class' (Verstärkte Normalbauart).

== History ==
These engines were designed by Robert Garbe and built between 1913 and 1921, forming the largest class of state railway locomotives in Germany. The boiler was larger than that of the G 8, and the locomotive was designed to be heavier to haul even the heaviest trains without sanding, due to its higher adhesive weight. Because it had a high axle load, the G 8.1 could however only be used on main lines. In addition to its employment with heavy goods traffic, it was later used for heavy pusher duties as well.

A total of 4,958 engines alone were made for the Prussian state railways and, later, the Deutsche Reichsbahn. The Imperial Railways in Alsace-Lorraine were given 137 (see the Alsace-Lorraine G 8.1), 10 went to the Grand Duchy of Mecklenburg Friedrich-Franz Railway, 50 to the German military railways in the First World War, 6 or 10 to the Gewerkschaft Deutscher Kaiser coal mine at Duisburg and 185 were sold abroad to Poland, Romania and Sweden). Linke-Hoffman delivered 20 locomotives to the Swedish state railways (SJ) in 1918, as Class G.

In 1925 the Reichsbahn took over 3,121 Prussian locomotives as Class 55.25–56 with operating numbers 55 2501–5622 (less 55 3367). The twelve Mecklenburg engines (two of which had been bought in 1920 by the Prussian state railways) were incorporated as Class 55.58 with the numbers 55 5801–5810 and 55 5851–5852. Included amongst the Prussian locomotives were also the ten G 8.1 from the Imperial Railways in Alsace-Lorraine. In 1935, 43 more locomotives came into the Reichsbahn fleet from the Saarland as numbers 55 5623–5665, the last of which came originally from the Alsace-Lorraine too. In the Second World War numerous locomotives from Poland and Lithuania were also designated as Class 55 engines. The engines taken over from Belgium were given the numbers 55 5666–5699. After 1945 the DR in East Germany added a further locomotive from Poland as 55 5898, and several from Belgium and France as 55 7251–7260 and 55 8170.

Between 1934 and 1941 a total of 691 G 8.1s were fitted with a leading axle in order to allow a higher top speed and to reduce the average axle load. The converted locomotives were redesignated as DRG Class 56.2–8.

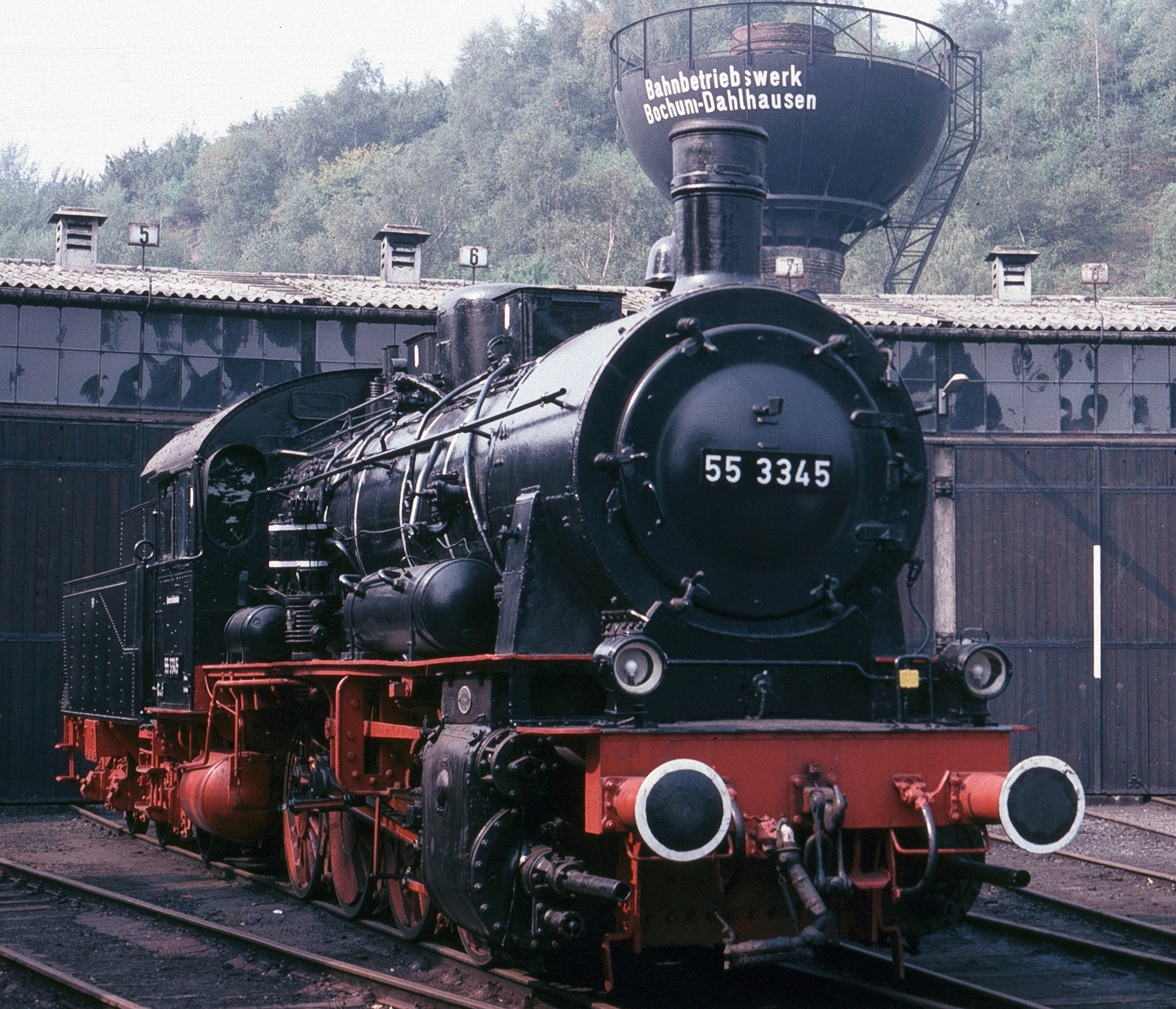
55 3345 at the Bochum Dahlhausen Railway Museum

More than 1,000 engines remained after the end of the Second World War. In 1968 the DR still had 150 locomotives, and the Deutsche Bundesbahn another 50, which they reclassified as Class 055 from 1968. The last G 8.1 with the DB, number 055 538–3, was taken out of service on 21 December 1972.

The vehicles were coupled with Prussian 3 T 16,5, 3 T 20 and 2'2' T 21,5 tenders.

Number 55 3345 (ex Cassel 5159) has been preserved. It was built in 1915 by Henschel and is today in the Bochum Dahlhausen Railway Museum.

== See also ==
- Prussian state railways
- List of Prussian locomotives and railcars
