= Alsace-Lorraine G 8.1 =

Class of German (later French) 0-8-0 locomotives

Alsace-Lorraine G 8.1 DRG Class 55.25–56 SNCF Class 1-040.D
Type and origin
- Builder: Grafenstaden, Henschel
- Build date: 1913–1919
- Total produced: 137
Specifications
- Configuration
  - Whyte: 0-8-0
- Driver dia.: 1,350 mm (53.15 in)
- Length
  - Over beams: 18,290 mm (60 ft 0.1 in)
- Axle load: 17.6 t (17.3 long tons; 19.4 short tons)
- Adhesive weight: 69.9 t (68.8 long tons; 77.1 short tons)
- Service weight: 69.9 t (68.8 long tons; 77.1 short tons)
- Water cap.: 16.5 m^{3} (583 cu ft) or 16,500 L (3,629 imp gal; 4,359 US gal)
- Boiler pressure: 14 bar (1,400 kPa; 200 psi)
- Heating surface
  - Firebox: 2.58 m^{2} (27.8 sq ft)
  - Evaporative: 143.28 m^{2} (1,542.3 sq ft)
- Cylinders: 2
- Cylinder size: 600 mm (23.622 in)
- Piston stroke: 660 mm (25.984 in)
Performance figures
- Maximum speed: 55 km/h (34 mph)
- Indicated power: 927 kW (1,243 hp)
Career
- Numbers: EL: 5151–5257; AL: 5001–5372; DRG: 55 2946, 3338-3340, 4275-4279, 4285 and 5665
- Retired: 1966

The Alsace-Lorraine Class G 8.1 was a superheated, goods train, steam locomotive with four driving axles, and was based on the Prussian G 8.1. There were no design differences between the two. The Imperial Railways in Alsace-Lorraine (Reichseisenbahnen in Elsaß-Lothringen) received a total of 137 G 8.1 engines between 1913 and 1919, of which eleven were built by Henschel and the rest by the Grafenstaden. They were numbered 5151 to 5278.

After the First World War ten locomotives were left in Germany and were later given the numbers 55 2946, 3338–3340, 4275-4279 and 4285 by the Deutsche Reichsbahn. One, 5157 was sold to the Saarland Railways in March 1935, only a few months before the Territory of the Saar Basin was transferred from France to Germany. AL 5157 became 55 5665 in the Reichsbahn fleet. After the end of the war, 72 Prussian G 8.1 engines remained in Alsace-Lorraine and went into the fleet of the AL, the successor to the Reichseisenbahnen. They were joined by a further 138 Prussian G 8.1s handed over as reparations. Several locomotives were passed on to the Chemins de fer de l'Est and the Algerian State Railway. The SNCF took over the G 8.1 as Class 040-D. The last G 8.1 in France was number 040-D-260, which was retired in 1966.

The engines were coupled with Prussian class 3 T 16.5 tenders.

== See also ==
- List of Alsace-Lorraine locomotives
