= Class 91 =

Class 91 may refer to:

- British Rail Class 91
- DRG or DR Class 91 2-6-0T tank locomotives with the Deutsche Reichsbahn:
  - Class 91.0-1: Prussian T 9.2, BLE Nos. 36 to 43, PKP Class TKi2
  - Class 91.3-18: Prussian T 9.3
  - Class 91.19: Mecklenburg T 4
  - Class 91.20: Württemberg T 9
- KTM Class 91
- South African Class 91-000
- CFR (Romanian Railways) Class 91 (now reclassified as class 98 )
