= Prussian G 5.3 =

Class of 206 German 2-6-0 locomotives

Prussian G 5.3 DRG class 54.6 PKP Ti3 État-Belge Type 75
Type and origin
- Builder: Berliner Maschinenbau; Borsig; Hanomag; Henschel & Sohn; Hohenzollern; Humboldt
- Build date: 1903–1906
- Total produced: 206
Specifications
  - German: G 34.14
- Leading dia.: 1,000 mm (3 ft 3 3/8 in)
- Driver dia.: 1,350 mm (4 ft 5 1/8 in)
- Length
  - Over beams: 16,168 millimetres (53 ft 9/16 in)
- Axle load: 14.5 tonnes (14.3 long tons; 16.0 short tons)
- Adhesive weight: 42.4 tonnes (41.7 long tons; 46.7 short tons)
- Service weight: 54.1 tonnes (53.2 long tons; 59.6 short tons)
- Tender type: pr 3 T 12
- Fuel capacity: 5 tonnes (4.9 long tons; 5.5 short tons) of coal
- Water cap.: 12.0 m^{3} (12,000 L; 2,600 imp gal; 3,200 US gal)
- Boiler
- No. of heating tubes: 216
- Boiler pressure: 12 kp/cm^{2} (1.2 MPa; 170 lbf/in^{2})
- Heating surface
  - Firebox: 2.3 m^{2} (25 sq ft)
  - Radiative: 10.8 m^{2} (116 sq ft)
  - Tubes: 126.2 m^{2} (1,358 sq ft)
  - Evaporative: 137.0 m^{2} (1,475 sq ft)
- Cylinders: 2
- Cylinder size: 490 mm (19 5/16 in)
- Piston stroke: 630 mm (24 13/16 in)
- Valve gear: Heusinger (Walschaerts)
Performance figures
- Maximum speed: 65 km/h (40 mph)
Career
- Numbers: DR 54 601 – 54 671
- Retired: 1930

The Prussian G 5.3 was a class of 2-6-0 goods locomotives. They were the two-cylinder-simple version of the compound G 5.4. As with many Prussian locomotive design, simple and compound versions of the same type built. The G 5.3, like the G 5.4, differed from the G 5.1 and G 5.2 as it had a shorter wheelbase and a higher-pitched boiler. The Krauss-Helmholtz bogie was intended to improve the driving characteristics, especially at higher speeds. Production of the G 5.3 was from 1903 until 1906, and 206 units were built.

At the end of World War I, 36 locomotives were surrendered as war reparations: 29 to Belgium as État-Belge Type 75, six to France, where they became 1851 to 1856 on the Chemin de fer de Paris à Orléans, and one to Italy where it became FS 603.001. In addition five were left in Alsace-Lorraine, where they became AL 4241–4245; 16 in Poland (PKP Ti3), three to Lithuania (LG class P 5.3, numbered 659 to 661) and one to Latvia (LVD class Pn, number 303, later to PKP).

In 1923, The Deutsche Reichsbahn listed 108 locomotives in its 1923 renumbering plan as 54 601 to 54 708; with a further 24 locomotives mis-classified as G 5.1, with the numbers 54 169 to 54 181, 54 183 to 54 193 allocated. In the final 1925 DRG renumbering plan for steam locomotives there were only 71 locomotives left, with numbers 54 601 to 54 671. The Reichsbahn retired its last G 5.3 in 1930.

During World War II four G 5.3 were repatriated from Poland as 54 651 to 54 654. The 54 655 to 54 659 were a mixed bag consisting of two former G 5.4 locomotives from Yugoslavia, a former G 5.3 from Poland, a G 5.4 from Lithuania, and G 5.3 also from Lithuania; the last three having been reclaimed from the Russians. The 54 651 and 654 had been used in Poland to power Armoured trains. The 54 656 was returned to the JDŽ in 1947.
