= Alsace-Lorraine A 1 =

Class of 2 German 2-4-0 locomotives

Type and origin
- Power type: Steam
- Builder: Carels Frères
- Serial number: 19, 20
- Build date: 1871
Specifications
- Configuration
  - Whyte: 2-4-0
  - UIC: 1B n2
- Gauge: 1,435 mm (4 ft 8 1/2 in)
- Driver dia.: 2,000 mm (6 ft 6 3/4 in)
Career
- Operators: Imperial Railways in Alsace-Lorraine
- Number in class: Two
- Numbers: 1, 2
- Retired: 1900–1904
- Disposition: Both scrapped

Alsace-Lorraine A 1 was a class of two express passenger 2-4-0 steam locomotives of the Imperial Railways in Alsace-Lorraine (Reichseisenbahnen in Elaß-Lothringen) that were acquired in 1871. They were in service until they were retired in 1900 and 1904.

After the Franco-Prussian War (1870–1871), the territory of Alsace and Lorraine was transferred from France to the newly-formed German Empire. With the acquisition, came the route network in Alsace Lorraine. However, the previous operator, the French Chemins de fer de l'Est had moved all its rolling stock west. The new owners had to procure a fleet of locomotives, carriages and wagons quickly.

The two locomotives classified in the series A 1 were acquired in 1871 from the locomotive factory Carels Frères in Gent, Belgium. Similar locomotives had been built for the Belgian state railway (Chemins de fer de l'État Belge). These two locomotives acquired by the Reichseisenbahnen were originally intended for the État-Belge and should have received the numbers 145 and 146. With the Reichseisenbahnen the locomotives got the numbers 1 and 2 were named after rivers in Prussia.

They were only used for a short time in express train service. Their performance did not meet the requirements, as they could not accelerate the trains to the required speed. Therefore after 1872, the locomotives were only used in non-express passenger train service. They were withdrawn between 1900 and 1904.

Table of locomotives
| EB No. | AL No. | Name |
|---|---|---|
| (145) | 1 | PREGEL |
| (146) | 2 | WARTHE |

== Design features ==
The locomotives had an outer frames. The steam dome sat on the front ring of the boiler, and had the safety valves mounted on top. The two cylinders and the valve gear were all mounted between the frames.

The suspension used leaf-springs mounted above frame. Between the leading axle and the first coupled axle, a compensation lever was installed.

The cab was enclosed. The chimney had a capuchon with a sloping top. A sand dome was situated behind the steam dome and acted on the front of the leading coupled wheel.
