= Alsace-Lorraine A 4 =

Class of 4 British-built German 2-4-0 locomotives

Type and origin
- Builder: Vulcan Foundry
- Build date: 1866
- Total produced: 4
Specifications
- Configuration
  - Whyte: 2-4-0
- Gauge: 1,435 mm (4 ft 8 1/2 in)
- Driver dia.: 1,524 mm (5 ft 0 in)
- Boiler pressure: 827 kPa (120 lbf/in^{2})
- Heating surface
  - Firebox: 1.58 m^{2} (17 sq ft)
  - Evaporative: 103.77 m^{2} (1,117 sq ft)
- Cylinder size: 432 mm (17 in)
- Piston stroke: 559 mm (22 in)
Career
- Numbers: (S&DR 21 to 24); EL 26 to 29
- Retired: by 1900

The Alsace-Lorraine A 4 was a class of four 2-4-0 express passenger locomotives acquired by the Imperial Railways in Alsace-Lorraine (Reichseisenbahnen in Elsaß-Lothringen, EL) in 1871.

== History ==
After the Franco-Prussian War (1870–1871), the territory of Alsace and Lorraine was transferred from France to the newly-formed German Empire. With the acquisition, came the route network in Alsace-Lorraine. However, the previous operator, the French Chemins de fer de l'Est had moved all its rolling stock west. The new owners had to procure a fleet of locomotives, carriages, and wagons quickly.

The four A 4 locomotives were bought from the Vulcan Foundry of Newton-le-Willows, England in 1871. They had originally been part of an order of six locomotives for the Somerset and Dorset Railway. VF had built the six locomotives (S&DR 19 to 24) in 1866, but the cash-strapped S&DR had only been able to pay for two (19 and 20), leaving VF with 21 to 24 to dispose of. On their sale to EL, they were renumbered 26 to 29 and named after rivers.

In 1898, numbers 26 and 29 were given counterweights on the coupling wheels. The first locomotive was retired in 1882, the last around 1900.

== Design ==
The locomotives had an inside frame for the driving wheels but carried the leading axle in an outer frame. The boiler barrel had three rings and a very high safety valve bonnet.

The two-cylinder saturated steam engine and its valve gear was between the frames. The suspension of the coupling axles was provided by leaf spring packages below the axle. The leading axle was cushioned by overhead leaf spring packages.

There was a sandbox on either side of the footplate that sanded the first coupled axle.

The locomotives were coupled to a three-axle tender with a 9 m^{3} water tank volume.

== Fleet list ==
Table of locomotives
| S&DR No. | EL No. | EL Name | VF serial No. |
|---|---|---|---|
| (21) | 26 | BODE | 564 |
| (22) | 27 | BOBER | 565 |
| (23) | 28 | WEICHSEL | 566 |
| (24) | 29 | EIDER | 567 |
