= Alsace-Lorraine A 3 =

Class of 8 German 2-4-0 locomotives

Alsace-Lorraine A 3 Alsace-Lorraine P 2 (from 1906)
Type and origin
- Builder: Georg Sigl at Wiener Neustädter Lokomotivfabrik
- Build date: 1870
- Total produced: 8
Specifications
- Configuration
  - Whyte: 2-4-0
- Gauge: 1,435 mm (4 ft 8 1/2 in)
- Coupled dia.: 1,580 mm (5 ft 2 1/4 in)
- Wheelbase
  - Overall: 3,477 mm (11 ft 5 in)
- Length
  - Over beams: 14,560 mm (47 ft 9 1/4 in)
- Adhesive weight: 24.4 t (24.0 long tons; 26.9 short tons)
- Empty weight: 30.6 t (30.1 long tons; 33.7 short tons)
- Service weight: 34.2 t (33.7 long tons; 37.7 short tons)
- Tender weight: 25.5 t (25.1 long tons; 28.1 short tons)
- Tender type: 3 T 8.5
- Fuel capacity: 4 t (8,800 lb) of coal
- Water cap.: 8.5 m^{3} (1,900 imp gal; 2,200 US gal)
- Boiler pressure: 8 kgf/cm^{2} (785 kPa; 114 lbf/in^{2})
- Heating surface
  - Firebox: 1.41 m^{3} (50 cu ft)
  - Radiative: 7.3 m^{3} (260 cu ft)
  - Tubes: 109.7 m^{2} (1,181 sq ft)
  - Evaporative: 117.0 m^{2} (1,259 sq ft)
- Cylinders: 2
- Cylinder size: 411 mm (16 3/16 in)
- Piston stroke: 632 mm (24 7/8 in)
Performance figures
- Maximum speed: 70 km/h (43 mph)
Career
- Numbers: 1870: 18–25; 1906: 549, 550
- Retired: by 1907

The Alsace-Lorraine A 3 was a class of German 2-4-0 express passenger locomotives. In 1906 the Imperial Railways in Alsace-Lorraine (Reichseisenbahnen in Elsaß-Lothringen) reclassified them as P 2.

== History ==
After the Franco-Prussian War (1870–1871), the territory of Alsace and Lorraine was transferred from France to the newly formed German Empire. With the acquisition, came the route network in Alsace-Lorraine. However, the previous operator, the French Chemins de fer de l'Est had moved all its rolling stock west. The new owners had to procure a fleet of locomotives, carriages and wagons quickly.

The six of the eight A 3 locomotives were acquired from Georg Sigl's Wiener Neustädter Lokomotivfabrik which were intended for the Alföld–Fiumei Vasút (Great Plain–Rijeka Railway, AFV) and were to receive the numbers 35 to 40. The Reichseisenbahnen bought two more directly from the AFV being that railway's second 39 and 40. The Reichseisenbahnen gave the eight locomotives the numbers 18 to 25 and the names of southern and central German rivers. The locomotives were used in passenger train traffic. Only two locomotives were renumbered in 1906, but they were retired by 1907.

== Design ==
The locomotives were of a common Austrian design at the time. The machines had an outer frame and a very deep three-section boiler. The steam dome was on the foremost boiler section directly behind the chimney. The firebox was behind the rear axle.

Saturated steam was delivered to two outside cylinders; the main rod was connected to the first drive axle, along with the external Allan valve gear. The drive axles were connected with a Hall crank.

The suspension is provided by leaf spring assemblies attached to the axle bearings. The springs of the coupling axles were connected by means of compensating levers.

The three-axle tender with a spindle brake was also of Austrian design. It held 8.5 m^{3} (1,900 imp gal; 2,200 US gal) of water and 4 tonnes (8,800 lb) of coal.

== Fleet list ==
Table of locomotives
AFV No.	AL No.	AL Name	WN serial No.	1906 No.
35	18	DONAU	1204	549
36	19	PERSANTE	1205	—
37	20	PLEISSE	1206	—
38	21	REZAT	1207	—
39 (1st)	22	REGNITZ	1208	550
40 (1st)	23	WUPPER	1209	—
39 (2nd)	24	LECH	1264	—
40 (2nd)	25	INN	1295	—
