= Prussian T 9 =

Class of German steam locomotives

The Prussian T 9 was a class of German steam locomotive which included several types of tank engine, all with six coupled wheels and two carrying wheels operated by the Prussian state railways.

== T 9.1 ==
Prussian T 9.1 DRG Class 90.0–2
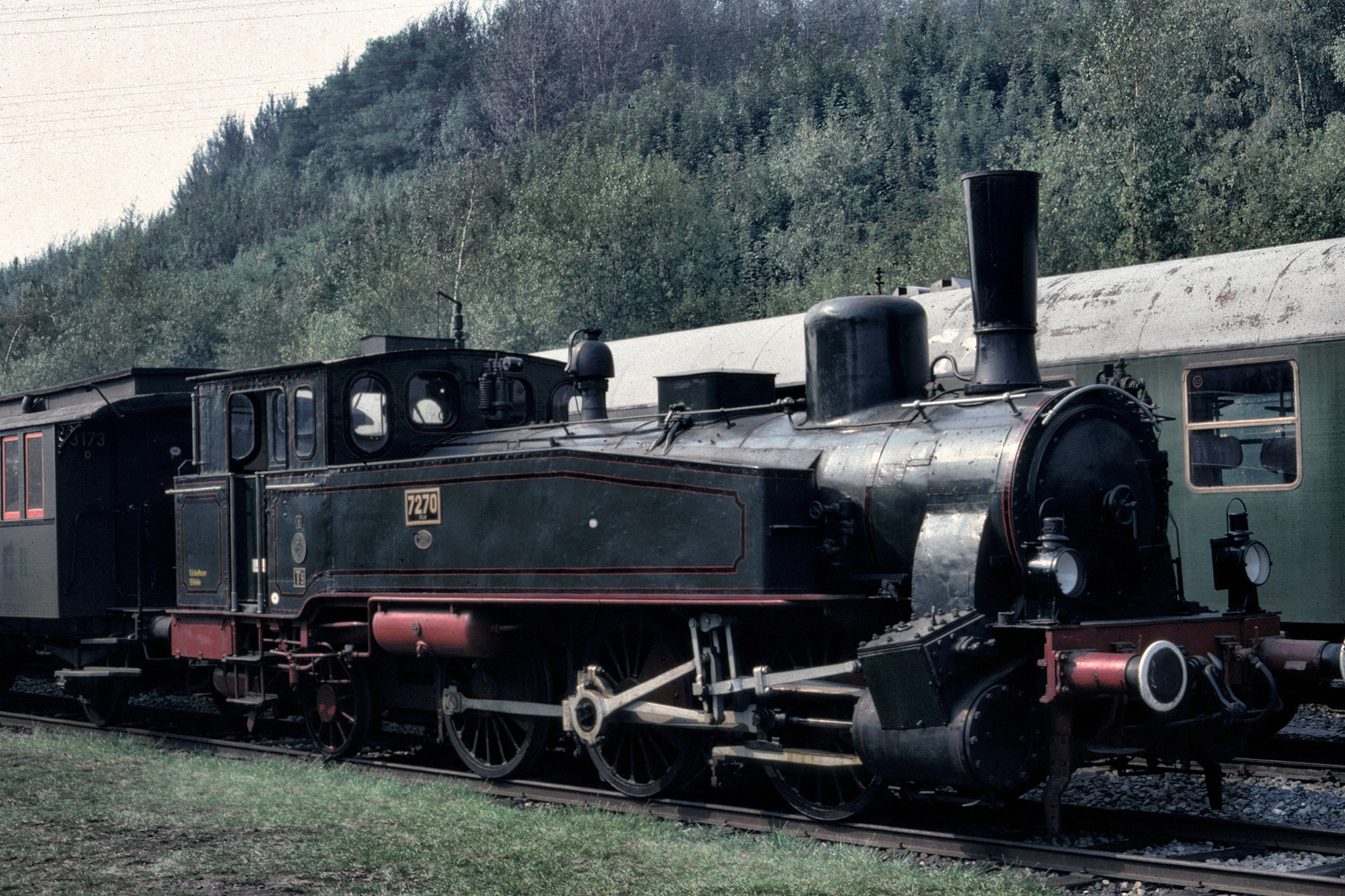
- Prussian T9.1 7270 Cöln at Bochum-Dahlhausen Railway Museum
Type and origin
- Builder: Borsig; Hanomag; Union Giesserei Königsberg; Hohenzollern; Grafenstaden; Henschel & Sohn; Schichau-Werke
- Build date: 1892–1901
- Total produced: 426
Specifications
- Configuration
  - Whyte: 0-6-2T
- Driver dia.: 1,350 mm (4 ft 5 1/8 in)
- Trailing dia.: 1,000 mm (39 3/8 in)
- Length
  - Over beams: 11,320 mm (37 ft 1 3/4 in)
- Axle load: 14.2 tonnes (14.0 long tons; 15.7 short tons)
- Adhesive weight: 41.5 tonnes (40.8 long tons; 45.7 short tons)
- Service weight: 54.5 tonnes (53.6 long tons; 60.1 short tons)
- Boiler pressure: 12 bar (1.20 MPa; 174 psi)
- Heating surface
  - Tubes: 1.53 m^{2} (16.5 sq ft)
  - Evaporative: 107.76 m^{2} (1,159.9 sq ft)
- Cylinder size: 430 mm (16 15/16 in)
- Piston stroke: 630 mm (24 13/16 in)
Performance figures
- Maximum speed: 60 km/h (37 mph)
- Indicated power: 331 kW (450 PS; 444 hp)
Career
- Numbers: DRG 90 001–252
- Retired: by 1953

Class T 9.1 of the Prussian state railways were goods train tank locomotives with a 0-6-2T wheel arrangement. They were intended for service on branch lines, for goods train duties on main lines and for shunting (rail) work. A total of 420 locomotives were built by various manufacturers for the Prussian state railways as well as 6 units for the Cronberg Railway, which had been taken over by the state railways in 1914.

In 1923 they were included by the Deutsche Reichsbahn as DRG Class 90.0-2 in their initial numbering plan with running numbers 90 001 to 90 328.

In 1925 the final plan recorded locomotives with the numbers 90 001 - 021, 90 024 - 90 115, 90 117 - 122 and 90 125 - 231 as well as the incorrectly designated Class 91 group with the numbers 91 088, 91 089, 91 109 - 114 and 91 301 and 302.

They were joined later by 90 232 to 90 234 from the Bremen Harbour Railway (Hafenbahn Bremen) 90 235 to 90 237 from the Saar Railway and 90 241 to 90 245 from the Lübeck-Büchen Railway, that had ordered six new T 9.1 engines in 1900 and 1903, and later bought four more, second-hand, locomotives from the Prussian state railways.

Several examples of this engine were handed over to foreign railway administrations and some of them later returned to the Deutsche Reichsbahn fleet during the Second World War as 90 246 - 251.

Two T9.1 have been preserved: One at the Bochum-Dahlhausen Railway Museum as "Cöln 1833", later "Cöln 7270", which was restored and has been displayed in front of the Starlight Express Theatre in Bochum since 9 November 2015, the other is in the South German Railway Museum at Heilbronn as "Cöln 1857".

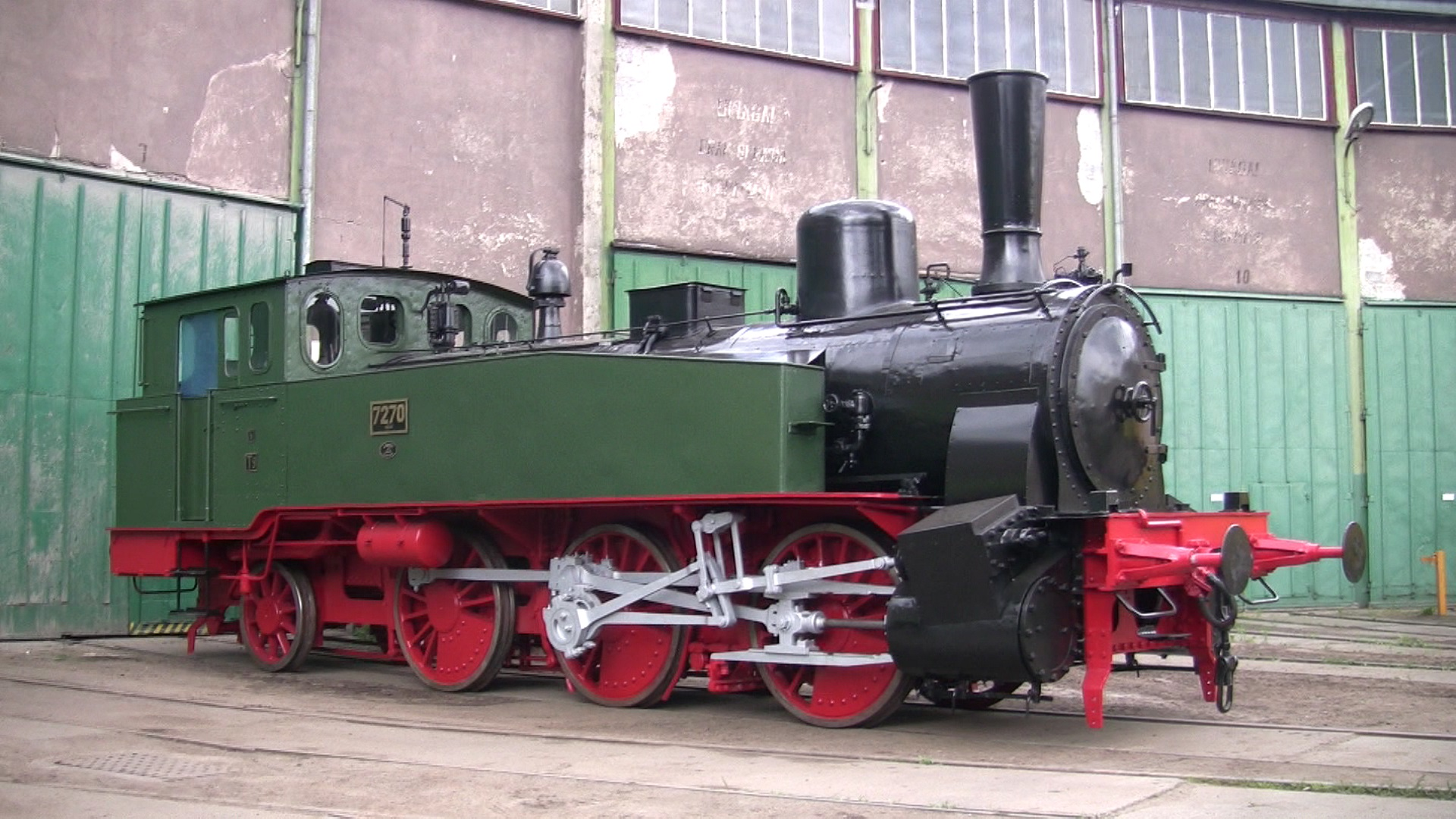
T 9.1 Cöln 1833, since 1906 Cöln 7270 (Borsig 4431/1893), May 8, 2015 at Interlok workshop, Pila, Poland, after complete reconstruction.

== T 9 - Elberfeld variant ==
Prussian T 9 – Elberfeld variant
Type and origin
- Builder: Henschel, Krauss
- Build date: 1891–1900
- Total produced: 37
Specifications
- Configuration
  - Whyte: 0-6-2T
- Gauge: 1,435 mm (4 ft 8 1/2 in)
- Driver dia.: 1,080 mm (3 ft 6 1/2 in)
- Trailing dia.: 810 mm (2 ft 7 7/8 in)
- Length
  - Over beams: 10,470 mm (34 ft 4 1/4 in)
- Axle load: 13.75 tonnes (13.53 long tons; 15.16 short tons)
- Adhesive weight: 39.5 tonnes (38.9 long tons; 43.5 short tons)
- Service weight: 48.1 tonnes (47.3 long tons; 53.0 short tons)
- Boiler pressure: 12 bar (1.20 MPa; 174 psi)
- Heating surface
  - Evaporative: 110.3 m^{2} (1,187 sq ft)
- Superheater
  - Heating area: 1.71 m^{2} (18.4 sq ft)
- Cylinder size: 400 mm (15 3/4 in)
- Piston stroke: 500 mm (19 11/16 in)
Performance figures
- Maximum speed: 45 km/h (28 mph)
Career
- Numbers: DRG 90 116
- Retired: 1931

The T 9 Elberfeld variant of the Prussian state railways was a goods train tank locomotive with an 0-6-2 wheel arrangement. These vehicles were planned for service on the line between Elberfeld and Cronenberg. For that purpose the firm of George Krauss built four examples, which were very similar to the Bavarian D VIII, because the Prussian T 3 was deemed to be too underpowered. After the locomotives had proved their worth, Henschel built another 33 examples.

In the 1923 DRG renumbering plan for steam locomotives the locomotives were grouped into DRG Class 90.3 with running numbers 351 - 363. In addition they were joined by T 9.1 engines with numbers 90 154, 155, 167, 180 - 183. In the 1925 numbering plan only locomotive 90 116 was left. She was retired in 1931. Seven of these locomotives were handed over to private railways where they were in service until the 1950s.

== T 9 - Langenschwalbach variant ==
Prussian T 9 – Langenschwalbach variant PKP TKi1-6
Type and origin
- Builder: Esslingen, Schwartzkopff
- Build date: 1892–1895
- Total produced: 19
Specifications
- Configuration
  - Whyte: 0-6-2T
- Gauge: 1,435 mm (4 ft 8 1/2 in)
- Driver dia.: 1,250 mm (4 ft 1 1/4 in)
- Trailing dia.: 810 mm (2 ft 7 7/8 in)
- Length
  - Over beams: 10,380 mm (34 ft 3/4 in)
- Axle load: 13.9 tonnes (13.7 long tons; 15.3 short tons)
- Adhesive weight: 43.8 tonnes (43.1 long tons; 48.3 short tons)
- Service weight: 53.8 tonnes (53.0 long tons; 59.3 short tons)
- Boiler pressure: 12 bar (1.20 MPa; 174 psi)
- Heating surface
  - Tubes: 1.73 m^{2} (18.6 sq ft)
  - Evaporative: 135.80 m^{2} (1,461.7 sq ft)
- Cylinder size: 450 mm (17 11/16 in)
- Piston stroke: 630 mm (24 13/16 in)
- Loco brake: Counterweight, Heberlein, Riggenbach, Westinghouse
Performance figures
- Maximum speed: 50 km/h (31 mph)
Career
- Numbers: DRG 90 232–233
- Retired: 1930

The Langenschwalbach variant of the T 9 with the Prussian state railways was a 0-6-2T tank locomotive. They were planned for service on the Aartalbahn between Wiesbaden and Langenschwalbach (today Bad Schwalbach), because this line, with inclines of up to 3,3%, had proven too steep for the Prussian T 3 engines on duty there. As a result, it was decided in 1889 to build eight new locomotives for the 21.4 km long route.

The engines had Allan valve gear, the carrying axle was designed as an Adams axle and the steam dome was located on the front boiler ring. Various brake systems were tested on these locos. In the 1923 renumbering plan, three locomotives were earmarked for renumbering to 90 002, 066 and 067. However, by 1925 they had been retired.

In 1930, following the takeover of the Bremen harbour railway, two more locomotives of this type joined the Deutsche Reichsbahn as numbers 90 232 and 90 233. However they were retired in the same year.

== T 9 - Upper Hessian Railway ==
Prussian T 9 – Upper Hessian Railway Company
Type and origin
- Builder: Krauss
- Build date: 1895
- Total produced: 1
Specifications
- Configuration
  - UIC: C1′
- Gauge: 1,435 mm (4 ft 8 1/2 in)
- Driver dia.: 1,210 mm (3 ft 11 5/8 in)
- Adhesive weight: 42 tonnes (41 long tons; 46 short tons)
- Service weight: 51 tonnes (50 long tons; 56 short tons)
- Boiler pressure: 12 bar (1.20 MPa; 174 psi)
- Heating surface
  - Firebox: 1.6 m^{2} (17 sq ft)
  - Evaporative: 103.9 m^{2} (1,118 sq ft)
- Cylinder size: 440 mm (17 5/16 in)
- Piston stroke: 600 mm (23 5/8 in)
Performance figures
- Maximum speed: 60 km/h (37 mph)

The single Upper Hessian Railway variant of the T9 was a goods train tank locomotive with a 0-6-2T wheel arrangement. It was built in 1895 by Krauss to a Bavarian design shortly before the transfer of this Hessian state railway to the Prussian state railways. It was given the number 26 by the Upper Hessian Railway; the Prussian state railway initially designated it as "Frankfurt 1871" and in 1906 as "Frankfurt 7205".

== T 9.2 ==
Prussian T 9.2 DRG Class 91.0–1
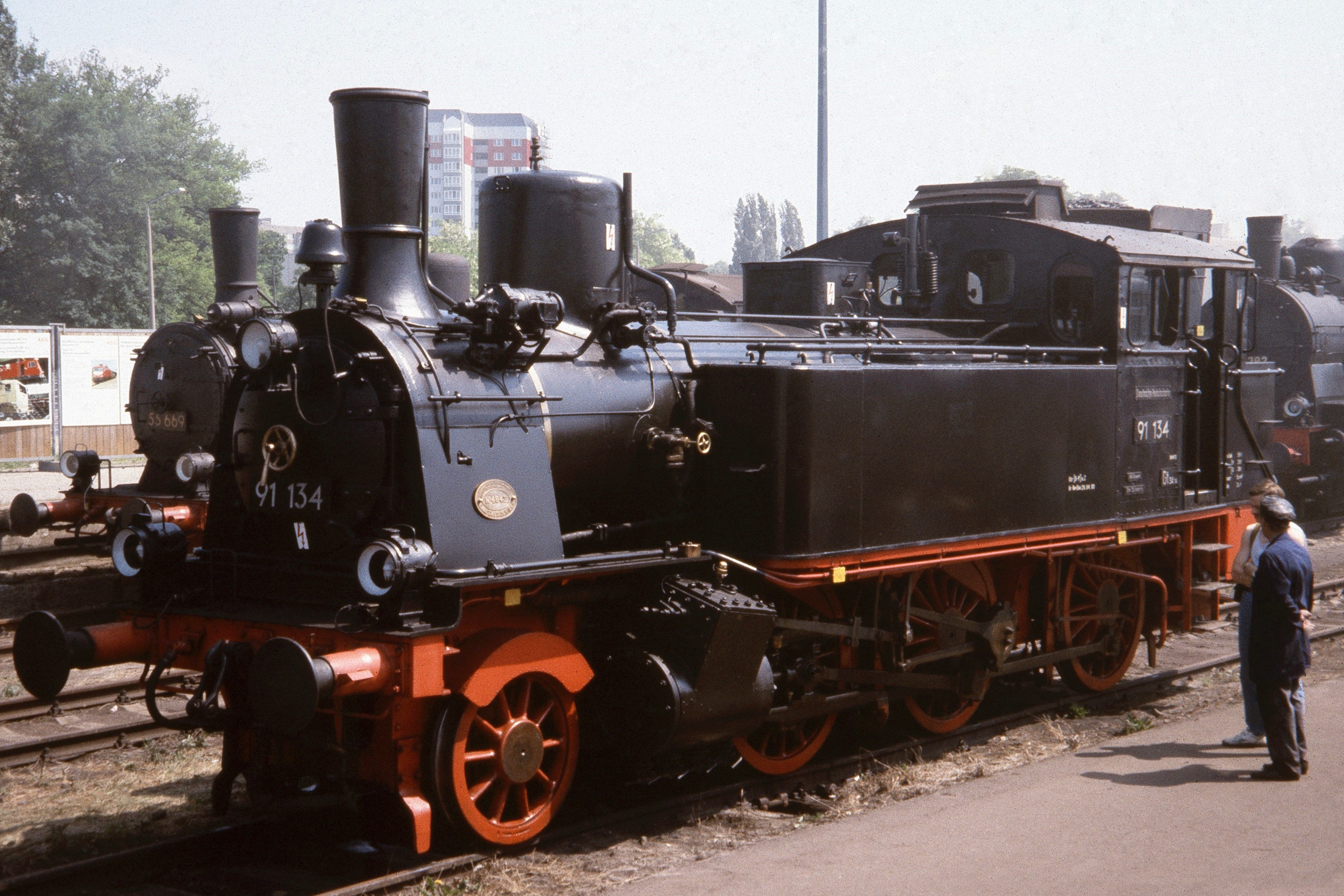
- DR 91 134 in Potsdam (1993)
Type and origin
- Builder: Union Giesserei Königsberg; Borsig; Grafenstaden; Hanomag; Hohenzollern
- Build date: 1892–1900
- Total produced: 235
Specifications
- Gauge: 1,435 mm (4 ft 8 1/2 in)
- Leading dia.: 1,000 mm (3 ft 3 3/8 in)
- Driver dia.: 1,350 mm (4 ft 5 1/8 in)
- Length
  - Over beams: 10,650 mm (34 ft 11 1/4 in)
- Axle load: 14.7 tonnes (14.5 long tons; 16.2 short tons)
- Adhesive weight: 41.0 tonnes (40.4 long tons; 45.2 short tons)
- Service weight: 52.6 tonnes (51.8 long tons; 58.0 short tons)
- Boiler pressure: 12 bar (1.20 MPa; 174 psi)
- Heating surface
  - Tubes: 1.75 m^{2} (18.8 sq ft)
  - Evaporative: 106.82 m^{2} (1,149.8 sq ft)
- Cylinder size: 430 mm (16 15/16 in)
- Piston stroke: 630 mm (24 13/16 in)
Performance figures
- Maximum speed: 60 km/h (37 mph)
- Indicated power: 338 kW (460 PS; 453 hp)
Career
- Numbers: DRG 91 001–121; DRG 91 131–149
- Retired: by 1966

Class T 9.2 of the Prussian state railways were goods train tank locomotives with a 2-6-0T wheel arrangement. They had the same range of tasks as the T 9.1, and its main dimensions were largely the same. The reason for its design was a fear that the riding qualities of the T 9.1 were too poor. As a result, it was given a leading axle instead of a trailing axle.

Of the 235 machines built, 154 units were incorporated by the Deutsche Reichsbahn in its 1923 renumbering plan and designated as DRG Class 91.0-1. According to the 1925 numbering plan, 111 locomotives were taken over as 91 001–087, 91 090–108, 91 115, as well as the wrongly classified 90 023, 90 024, 90 123 and 90 124.

The locos with running numbers 91 116–121 came from the Bremen harbour railway (91 116) and the Saar Railway (91 117 to 91 121). They were joined in 1938 by numbers 91 131–136 from the Brunswick State Railway. In the Second World War, locomotives 91 137–149 came from Poland. After the war there were only a few left in service. The Deutsche Bundesbahn retired its last machine in 1953 and the Deutsche Reichsbahn (GDR) followed suit in 1966. The Reichsbahn engine, 91 134, has been preserved and since August 2006 has been owned by the Mecklenburg Railway Society (Mecklenburgische Eisenbahnfreunden) in Schwerin.

== T 9.3 ==
Prussian T 9.3 DRG Class 91.3–18, 91.20 ÖBB 691, PKP Class TKi 3, SNCB Type 93
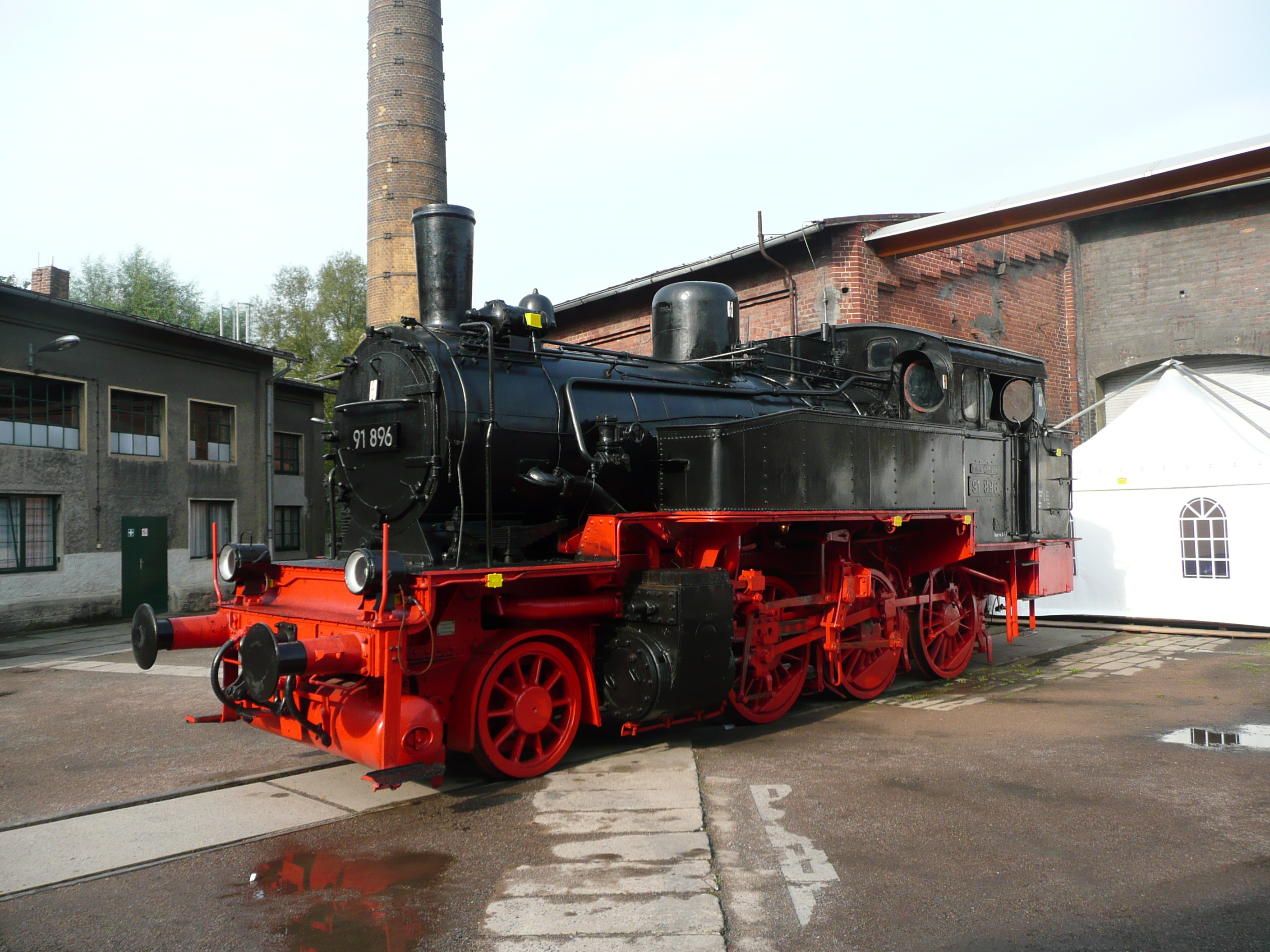
Type and origin
- Builder: Borsig; Henschel & Sohn; Union Giesserei Königsberg; Schichau-Werke; Hohenzollern; Humboldt; Arnold Jung Lokomotivfabrik; Hanomag; Orenstein & Koppel; Maschinenfabrik Christian Hagans; Grafenstaden
- Build date: 1900–1914
- Total produced: 2,060
Specifications
- Gauge: 1,435 mm (4 ft 8 1/2 in)
- Leading dia.: 1,000 mm (3 ft 3 3/8 in)
- Driver dia.: 1,350 mm (4 ft 5 1/8 in)
- Length
  - Over beams: 10,700 mm (35 ft 1 1/4 in)
- Axle load: 15.6 tonnes (15.4 long tons; 17.2 short tons)
- Adhesive weight: 36.1 tonnes (35.5 long tons; 39.8 short tons)
- Service weight: 46.1 tonnes (45.4 long tons; 50.8 short tons)
- Boiler pressure: 12 bar (1.20 MPa; 174 psi)
- Heating surface
  - Firebox: 1.50 m^{2} (16.1 sq ft)
  - Evaporative: 103.66 m^{2} (1,115.8 sq ft)
- Cylinder size: 450 mm (17 11/16 in)
- Piston stroke: 630 mm (24 13/16 in)
Performance figures
- Maximum speed: 65 km/h (40 mph)
- Indicated power: 346 kW (470 PS; 464 hp)
Career
- Numbers: DRG 91 303–1836; DRG 91 2001–2010
- Retired: by 1971

Class T 9.3 of the Prussian state railways were tank locomotives that were used both in passenger and freight train services. A total of 2,060 were of this type were built for the Prussian state railways (including those engines from the East Prussian Southern Railway which was nationalised in 1903). The Royal Württemberg State Railways procured a further 10 examples as the Württemberg T 9. The Imperial Railways in Alsace-Lorraine had bought a total of 132 T 9.3s. Even various private railways took delivery of the T 9.3. In 1925 it was included by the Deutsche Reichsbahn as DRG Class 91.3-18 and 91.20 in its numbering plan.

This was an evolutionary development of the Prussian T 9.2, in which the main difference was the use of a Krauss-Helmholtz bogie instead of an Adams axle. That meant that its top speed could be increased to 60 km/h, and later even to 65 km/h. The Reichsbahn took over 1,503 machines from Prussia as 91 303 to 91 1805, of which ten T9.3s originally came from the Imperial Railways in Alsace-Lorraine; and 10 Württemberg T 9s as 91 2001 to 91 2010. In 1935 the Reichsbahn took over 31 from the Saar Railway as 91 1806 to 91 1836. In the Second World War more locomotives were added from Belgium as numbers 91 1837 to 91 1844.

On 1 April 1949, the Deutsche Reichsbahn (GDR) took over yet more T 9.3s from private railway companies, with the numbers 91 6501, 6576, 6577, 6581 and 6582, some of which had been converted to superheating.

Their retirement began after 1945 and was completed in the Deutsche Bundesbahn in 1964 and in the Deutsche Reichsbahn (GDR) in 1971.

Six T 9.3s remained in Austria after the Second World War. Two were handed over to the SZD in 1948 (91 1700 and 1822), two were rather quickly retired (91 1421 in 1951 and 91 1314 in 1952). The remaining two engines, 91 1207 and 91 1347, formed ÖBB Class 691 retaining their serial numbers. Both were used in the St. Pölten region and retired in 1957.

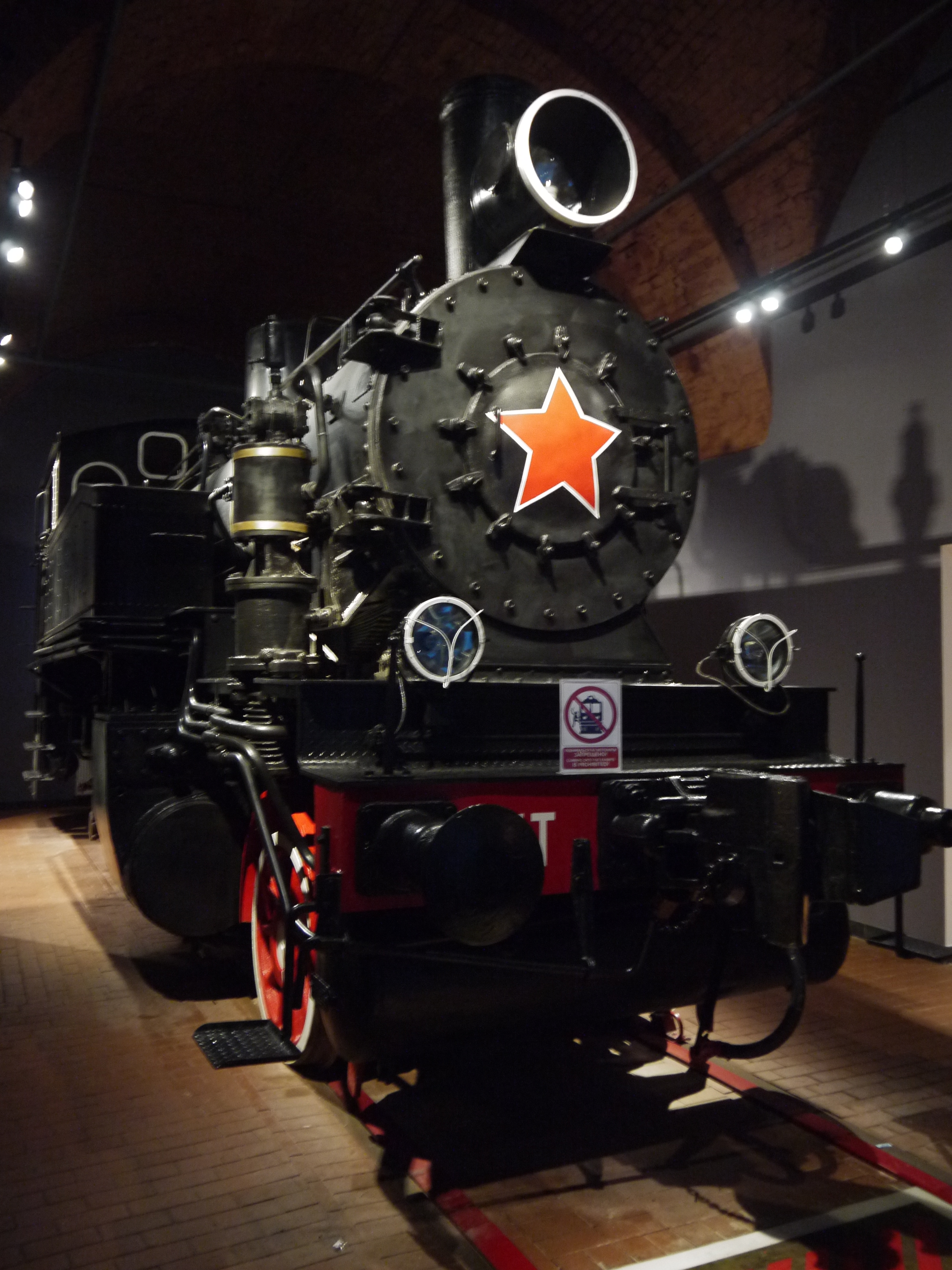
TT-1770 a captured "trophy" locomotive at the Russian Railway Museum in Saint Petersburg. She is a re-gauged Prussian T 9.3 to Russian 5ft gauge.

In Germany two have been preserved: number 91 896^{II} in Dresden and 91 936 in Berlin. The Minden Museum Railway is rebuilding a T 9.3.

Two re-gauged examples are preserved in Russia. TT-1770 is preserved at the Russian Railway Museum in Saint Petersburg. While unrestored TT-397 example is at the Railway Museum at Shushary, Saint Petersburg.

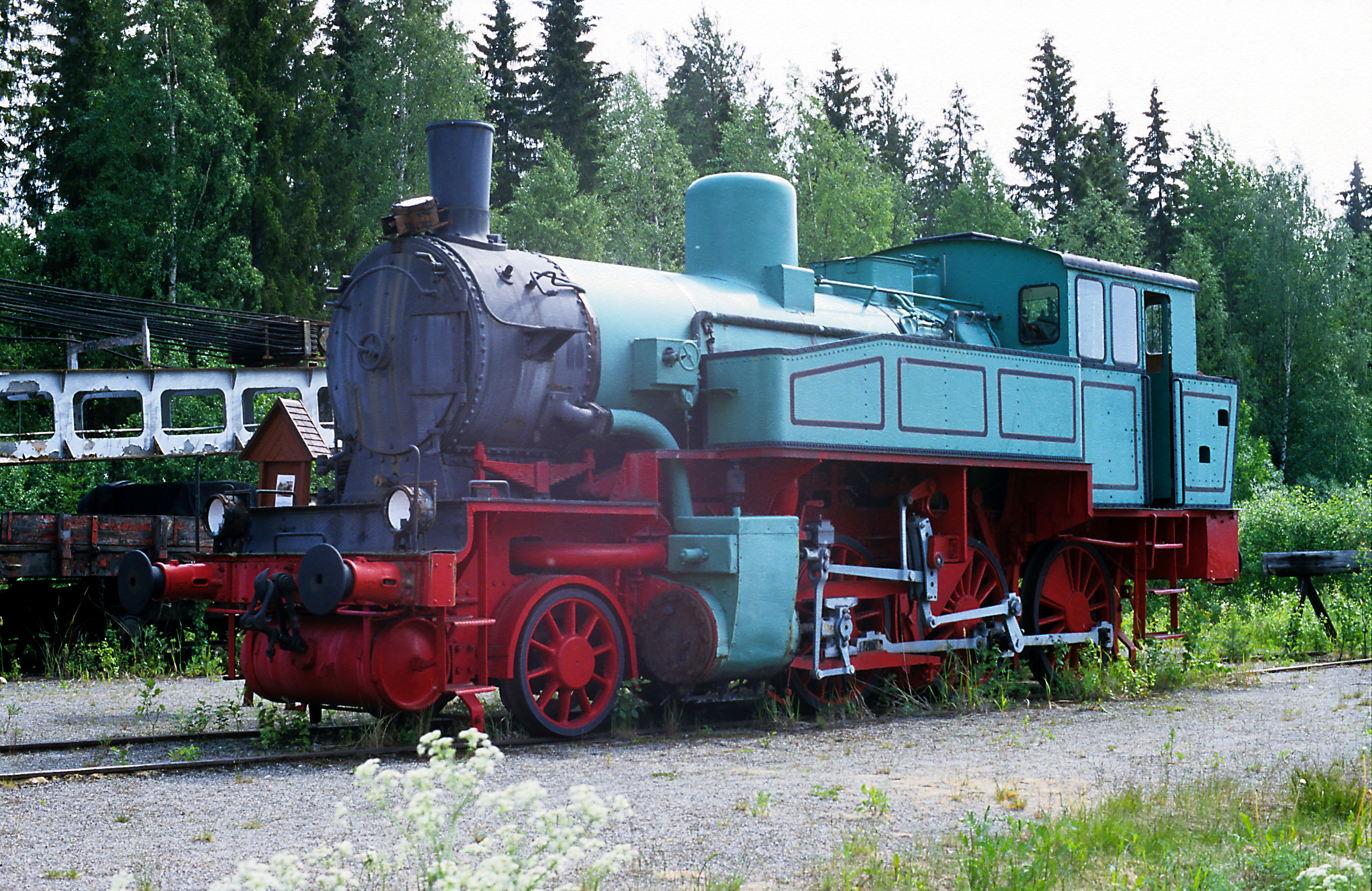
Prussian T 9.3 at Haapamaki, Finland

One example is at the Steam Locomotive Park at Haapamaki, Finland

== See also ==
- Prussian state railways
- List of Prussian locomotives and railcars
