= Alsace-Lorraine B 1 =

Class of 12 German 0-4-2 locomotives

Type and origin
- Builder: Strousberg
- Build date: 1870
- Total produced: 12
Specifications
- Configuration
  - Whyte: 0-4-2
- Driver dia.: 1,412 mm
- Coupled dia.: 1,412 mm
- Carrying wheel diameter: 1,040 mm
- Wheelbase
  - Overall: 4,342 mm
- Length
  - Over beams: 13,267 mm
- Adhesive weight: 25.4 t
- Empty weight: 29.1 t
- Service weight: 31.9 t
- Tender weight: 26.1 t
- Tender type: 2 T 10
- Fuel capacity: 3.5-4 t coal
- Water cap.: 9-10 m^{3}
- Boiler pressure: 8.5 bar
- Heating surface
  - Firebox: 1.28 m^{2}
  - Radiative: 8.14 m^{2}
  - Tubes: 79.59 m^{2}
  - Evaporative: 87.68 m^{2}
- Cylinders: 2
- Cylinder size: 418 mm
- Piston stroke: 602 mm
Performance figures
- Maximum speed: 60 km/h
Career
- Numbers: Nr. 30–41; Nr. 501–512 (from 1906); Nos. 101–102 (from 1912)

The steam locomotives of Alsace-Lorraine Class B 1 were procured by the Imperial Railways in Alsace-Lorraine in 1871. In 1906 they were reorganised into Class P 1.

== History ==
When Germany took over the railway network in Alsace-Lorraine following their victory in the Franco-Prussian War, there was a need to procure locomotives and coaches because the French had withdrawn all the railway stock. Originally the intent was to use the 12 locomotives (nos. 16 to 23) built by Strousberg to 'Strousberg norms' for the Halle-Sorau-Guben railway. They were no longer in service there, because the Reich railways purchased them immediately after their delivery. The locomotives were given the numbers 30 to 41 and christened with the names of various German rivers.

In 1906 the locomotives were renumbered as 501 to 512. In 1912, numbers 504 and 509 were again renumbered to 101 and 102. All other locomotives had already been retired by then. Locomotive 102 was still occasionally working in 1918 (as a so-called Auswaschlokomotive) in the Mühlhausen area.

== Design features ==
The locomotives had an inside frame and the boiler had three shells, the rear one being crowned by the steam dome. The outer firebox had a Belpaire cover, a deep firebox that extended below the axles and a large smokebox.

The locomotive had an outside, twin-cylinder wet steam engine and an inside Allan valve gear. The connecting rod drove the second coupled axle.

Springing of the coupled axles was achieved using overhung leaf springs. The spring elements were linked by equalising beams. On the carrying axles, transverse leaf springs were used.

The locomotives were later fitted with a Westinghouse compressed-air brake, a steam heating system, washout equipment, sand distributor and adjustable blastpipe.

The tender had a horseshoe water tank and a second water container between the frame. That enabled it to carry up to 9 m^{3} of water.

== See also ==
- Imperial Railways in Alsace-Lorraine
- List of Alsace-Lorraine locomotives
- Länderbahnen
