= Prussian G 5.2 =

Prussian G 5.2 DRG class 54.2–3 PKP Ti2 État Belge Type 75
Type and origin
- Builder: Berliner Maschinenbau; Borsig; Grafenstaden; Hanomag; Henschel & Sohn; Schichau-Werke
- Build date: 1896–1901
- Total produced: Prussia: 491 (Preußen)
Specifications
- Gauge: 1,435 mm (4 ft 8 1/2 in)
- Leading dia.: 1,000 mm (3 ft 3 3/8 in)
- Driver dia.: 1,350 mm (4 ft 5 1/8 in)
- Wheelbase
  - Overall: 12,751 mm (41 ft 10 in) loco+tender
- Length
  - Over beams: 16,168 mm (53 ft 1/2 in)
- Axle load: 14.6 t (14.4 long tons; 16.1 short tons)
- Adhesive weight: 43.0 t (42.3 long tons; 47.4 short tons)
- Service weight: 51.1 t (50.3 long tons; 56.3 short tons)
- Tender type: pr 3 T 12
- Fuel capacity: 5 t (4.9 long tons; 5.5 short tons) of coal
- Water cap.: 12.0 m^{3} (12,000 L; 2,600 imp gal; 3,200 US gal)
- Boiler
- No. of heating tubes: 216
- Boiler pressure: 12.0 bar (1.20 MPa; 174 lbf/in^{2})
- Heating surface
  - Firebox: 2.3 m^{2} (25 sq ft)
  - Radiative: 10.8 m^{2} (116 sq ft)
  - Evaporative: 137.0 m^{2} (1,475 sq ft)
- High-pressure cylinder: 480 mm (18 7/8 in)
- Low-pressure cylinder: 680 mm (26 3/4 in)
- Piston stroke: 630 mm (24 13/16 in)
Performance figures
- Maximum speed: 65 km/h (40 mph)
Career
- Numbers: DRG 54 201 to 54 386
- Retired: DR: 1931; PKP: 1954

The Prussian G 5.2 was a class of two-cylinder compound goods locomotive introduced in 1895. As with many Prussian locomotive design, simple and compound versions of the same type were built – in this case the G 5.2 was the two-cylinder compound version of the simple G 5.1. The compound locomotives were more economical and more powerful than the simple locomotives; they were more suitable for long stretches with few stops. The newly introduced air brakes made it possible to use the G 5.2 on passenger trains, which the Prussian State Railways often did.

Production started in 1895 and continued until 1901, with 491 locomotives built for Prussia. The Reichseisenbahnen in Elsaß-Lothringen (Imperial Railways in Alsace-Lorraine) acquired 215 similar locomotives between 1900 and 1908 as their C29, C31 and C32 classes (see Alsace-Lorraine G 5.2).

In 1923 the Deutsche Reichsbahn (DRG) included 317 locomotives in its steam locomotive renumbering plan as 54 201 to 54 517. However, 13 locomotives remained in foreign hands. In 1925 the remaining locomotives were renumbered 54 201 to 54 386. Of these, 23 (54 324, 54 343, 54 344, 54 353 and 54 368 to 54 386 were from the Reichseisenbahnen in Elsaß-Lothringen. The DRG retired its G 5.2 locomotives by the end of 1931.

After World War I, 18 Prussian G5.2 locomotives were left in Alsace-Lorraine, and five in Yugoslavia. After the Treaty of Versailles, 86 locomotives had to be surrendered as reparations: 39 to France (where they became Chemin de fer de Paris à Orléans 1963–2001), 36 to Belgium (Type 75), six to Italy (FS 603), and five to Czechoslovakia (ČSD 335). A further 74 locomotives were ceded to Poland where that became PKP class Ti2, and numbered Ti2-1 to Ti2-74; five to Latvia (LVD Pn) and five to Lithuania. Six more went to the Territory of the Saar Basin as Saar 4101–4106).

During World War II, 27 former PKP Ti2 locomotives were reclaimed by Germany from the Russians and 23 were renumbered 54 701 to 54 723 in the Reichsbahn's fleet. Included in this group were 12 former Alsace-Lorraine locomotives, which became 54 704, 54 708 to 54 717 and 54 723. After the end of the war, eight locomotives remained with PKP, who retired the last by 1954.

The locomotives were coupled to tenders of type pr 3 T 12.
