= Alsace-Lorraine A 2 =

Class of 15 German 2-4-0 locomotives

Type and origin
- Power type: Steam
- Builder: Strousberg (Hanomag)
- Serial number: 461–471, 477–480
- Build date: 1870
Specifications
- Configuration
  - Whyte: 2-4-0
  - UIC: 1B n2
- Gauge: 1,435 mm (4 ft 8 1/2 in)
- Driver dia.: 1,726 mm (5 ft 8 in)
- Wheelbase: 4,350 mm (14 ft 3 1/4 in)
- Length: 10,780 mm (35 ft 4 1/2 in) over buffers
- Adhesive weight: 23.4 tonnes (23.0 long tons; 25.8 short tons)
- Loco weight: Empty: 31.5 tonnes (31.0 long tons; 34.7 short tons); Service: 34.9 tonnes (34.3 long tons; 38.5 short tons)
- Tender weight: Service: 23.2 tonnes (22.8 long tons; 25.6 short tons)
- Fuel type: Coal
- Fuel capacity: 4 tonnes (3.9 long tons; 4.4 short tons)
- Water cap.: 8,300 litres (1,800 imp gal; 2,200 US gal)
- Firebox
  - Type: Belpaire
  - Grate area: 1.3 m^{3} (46 cu ft)
- Boiler pressure: 8.5 kg/cm^{2} (834 kPa; 121 psi)
- Heating surface
  - Firebox: 7.18 m^{2} (77.3 sq ft)
  - Tubes: 74.56 m^{2} (802.6 sq ft)
  - Total surface: 81.74 m^{2} (879.8 sq ft)
- Cylinders: Two, outside
- Cylinder size: 405 mm × 562 mm (15 15/16 in × 22 1/8 in)
Career
- Operators: Imperial Railways in Alsace-Lorraine
- Number in class: 15
- Numbers: 1870: 3 – 17; 1906: 536–584

The Alsace-Lorraine A 2 was a class of German 2-4-0 express passenger locomotives. In 1906 the Imperial Railways in Alsace-Lorraine (Reichseisenbahnen in Elsaß-Lothringen) reclassified them as P 2.

== History ==
After the Franco-Prussian War (1870–1871), the territory of Alsace and Lorraine was transferred from France to the newly-formed German Empire. With the acquisition, came the route network in Alsace-Lorraine. However, the previous operator, the French Chemins de fer de l'Est had moved all its rolling stock west. The new owners had to procure a fleet of locomotives, carriages and wagons quickly.

The fifteen A 2 locomotives had originally been built by Strousberg for the Halle-Sorau-Gubener Railway Company. However, they were not there long, as the Reichseisenbahnen acquired them immediately after delivery. The locomotives were given the numbers 3 to 17 and the names of various German rivers.

The locomotives were first used in express train service; they later migrated to ordinary passenger train service. The locomotives reached speeds of 85 to 90 km/h (53 to 56 mph) and had a relatively quiet run. In 1907, there were still thirteen locomotives in operation, but they were all retired by 1912.

== Design ==
The locomotives had an inside frame. The boiler had a slightly protuberant Belpaire firebox. The ash pan reached far below the dome centreline. The Reichseisenbahnen operated the locomotives with a reduced boiler pressure of 8.5 kg/cm^{2} (834 kPa; 121 psi) instead of the possible 10 kg/cm^{2} (981 kPa; 142 psi). The steam dome was on the rear ring of the boiler. In front of this was the sand dome, which only fed the front of the leading driving wheelset.

The cylinders (two) were mounted horizontally outside the frame. Allan valve gear was used, mounted inside the frame. The connecting rod was attached to the leading driving wheelset.

The suspension was carried out by means of leaf spring packages below the axleboxes. The balance levers between the axles were later removed to increase the size of the firebox.

Originally the locomotives only had a handbrake on the tender; later, an air brake was installed.

The locomotives were coupled to a two-axle tender with a capacity of 8.3 m^{3} of water and 4 tonnes (3.9 long tons; 4.4 short tons) of coal.

== Fleet list ==
Table of locomotives
| HSG No. | AL No. | AL Name | Strouber serial No. | 1906 No. |
|---|---|---|---|---|
| 1 | 3 | RHEIN | 461 | 556 |
| 2 | 4 | MAIN | 462 | 537 |
| 3 | 5 | ODER | 463 | — |
| 4 | 6 | ELBE | 464 | 538 |
| 5 | 7 | NECKAR | 465 | 539 |
| 6 | 8 | HAVEL | 466 | 540 |
| 7 | 9 | SPREE | 467 | 541 |
| 8 | 10 | LAHN | 468 | 542 |
| 9 | 11 | NAHE | 469 | 543 |
| 10 | 12 | SAAR | 470 | 544 |
| 11 | 13 | MOSEL | 471 | 545 |
| 15 | 14 | WESER | 477 | 546 |
| 16 | 15 | SAALE | 478 | 547 |
| 17 | 16 | LIPPE | 479 | — |
| 18 | 17 | RUHR | 480 | 548 |
