= Bavarian B IX (old) =

Type and origin
- Builder: Strousberg
- Build date: 1870
- Total produced: 4
Specifications
- Configuration
  - Whyte: 0-4-2
  - UIC: B1 n2
- Gauge: 1,435 mm (4 ft 8 1/2 in)
- Driver dia.: 1,412 mm (4 ft 7 5/8 in)
- Adhesive weight: 25.2 t (24.8 long tons; 27.8 short tons)
- Service weight: 31.7 t (31.2 long tons; 34.9 short tons)
- Tender type: 2 T 8
- Fuel capacity: 3.5 t (7,720 lb)
- Water cap.: 8.0 m^{3} (1,800 imp gal; 2,100 US gal)
- Boiler pressure: 8.5 kgf/cm^{2} (834 kPa; 121 lbf/in^{2})
- Heating surface
  - Firebox: 1.30 m^{2} (14.0 sq ft)
  - Evaporative: 89.00 m^{2} (958.0 sq ft)
- Cylinders: 2
- Cylinder size: 418 mm (16 7/16 in)
- Piston stroke: 602 mm (23 11/16 in)
- Valve gear: Allan
Performance figures
- Maximum speed: 60 km/h (37 mph)
Career
- Numbers: K.Bay.Sts.E: 503 WÖRTH to 506 MARS LA TOUR; EL: 347 THUR to 350 MOSSIG

The first four steam locomotives designated as Class B IX by the Royal Bavarian State Railways were procured from the locomotive works of Strousberg. They were transferred in 1872 to the Imperial Railways in Alsace-Lorraine. For the remainder, see Bavarian B IX.

They were equipped with tenders of Class 3 T 10.

== See also ==
- Royal Bavarian State Railways
- List of Bavarian locomotives and railbuses
- Bavarian B IX
