= Prussian G 5.5 =

Prussian G 5.5 DRG Class 54.10
Type and origin
- Build date: 1910
- Total produced: 20 or 25
Specifications
- Configuration
  - Whyte: 2-6-0
- Gauge: 1,435 mm (4 ft 8 1/2 in)
- Leading dia.: 1,000 mm (39 in)
- Driver dia.: 1,350 mm (4 ft 5 in)
- Length
  - Over beams: 16,168 mm (53 ft 0.5 in)
- Axle load: 15.3 t
- Adhesive weight: 44.0 t
- Service weight: 55.1 t
- Water cap.: 12.0 m^{3} (2,600 imp gal) / 15.0 m^{3} (3,300 imp gal)
- Boiler pressure: 12 bar
- Heating surface
  - Firebox: 2.29 m^{2} (24.6 sq ft)
  - Evaporative: 137.00 m^{2} (1,474.7 sq ft)
- Cylinders: 2
- Cylinder size: 500 mm (20 in) / 750 mm (30 in)
- Piston stroke: 630 mm (25 in)
Performance figures
- Maximum speed: 65 km/h (40 mph)
- Indicated power: 574/750 kW
Career
- Numbers: DRG 54 1076-1092

The Prussian G 5.5 locomotives were early German freight locomotives with a compound engine. Unlike the otherwise identical G 5.4 they had a leading Adams axle instead of a Krauss-Helmholtz bogie. The delivery of the G 5.5 in 1910 followed directly after that of the G 5.4. A total of either 20 or 25 G 5.5 locomotives were built.

The Deutsche Reichsbahn took over several of these locomotives as Nos. 54 1076-1092; other sources list them as Nos. 54 1080-1082 and 1085-1092. During the Second World War, several more G 5.5's were reclaimed by the Reichsbahn from Poland: Nos. 54 1121, 1141, 1157 and 1185; other sources cite 54 1183, 1217 and 1218.

Other railways also procured this class:

- Grand Duchy of Mecklenburg Friedrich-Franz Railway: Nine locomotives, classed as G 5.4, see Mecklenburg G 5.4.
- Imperial Railways in Alsace-Lorraine: Three locomotives from 1912, see Alsace-Lorraine G 5.5.

== See also ==
- Prussian state railways
- List of Prussian locomotives and railbuses
