= Capuchon (chimney) =

Raised lip on the funnel of a ship or steam locomotive

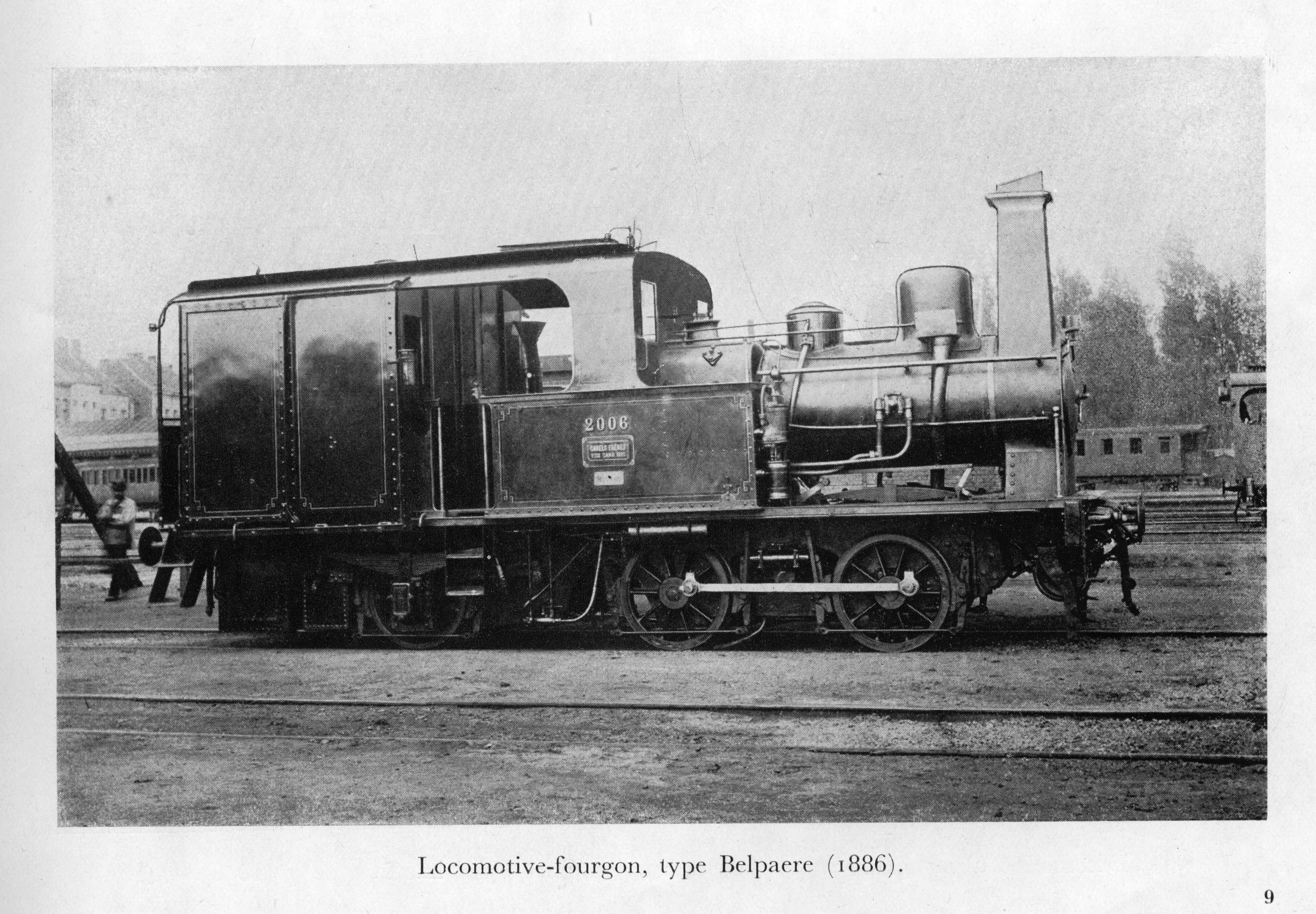
Belgian steam locomotive of 1886, showing capuchon

A capuchon is a raised lip at the front of a ship's funnel or the chimney of a steam locomotive. It is intended to prevent downdraughts when in motion and encourage smoke to rise. Sometimes capuchons were made of plate steel bolted or welded in place, others were an integral part of the chimney casting. The name derives from their resemblance to a type of ceremonial hat.

== On locomotives ==
=== Downdraughts ===
A moving locomotive can suffer problem downdraughts when air flowing over the chimney is diverted down it on meeting the back rim. This increases the pressure in the engine's smokebox, interfering with the process of drawing exhaust through from the firebox.

Capuchons were initially added to raise the stream of air slightly so it would clear the back rim, thereby preventing the downdraught.

=== Smoke flow near the locomotive ===
A capuchon turned out also to help deflect the stream of smoke upwards and away from the locomotive. This was desirable because of the aerodynamics around a moving locomotive.

As the locomotive advances, air immediately in front is pushed radially outwards. This outflow creates a ring of low pressure around the front part of the locomotive; this, in turn, causes a ring of eddies to form there.

Smoke which is too close to the locomotive is caught in these and swept back down, potentially obscuring the line of sight of the crew. A capuchon helped to avoid this by directing the smoke away from the eddies.

As locomotives became more powerful, their boilers became larger, leaving less height available for the chimney. At the same time, more efficient engine design reduced the pressure of the blasts of steam used to expel the smoke. (Note: Strictly, the pressure in the blastpipe.) The net result was gentler expulsion closer to the locomotive body and to the eddies. A capuchon alone was no longer enough to keep the smoke clear of them, and additional measures were needed: for example, the use of large metal plates to affect airflow.

=== Locomotives with capuchons ===
Many Belgian locomotives built in the late 19th and early 20th centuries were fitted with distinctive high capuchons, for example the Type 8 4-6-0 compounds.

== On ships ==
When fitted to ships' funnels the intention is to keep the after decks clear of exhaust smuts.
