= Elsässische Maschinenbau-Gesellschaft Grafenstaden =

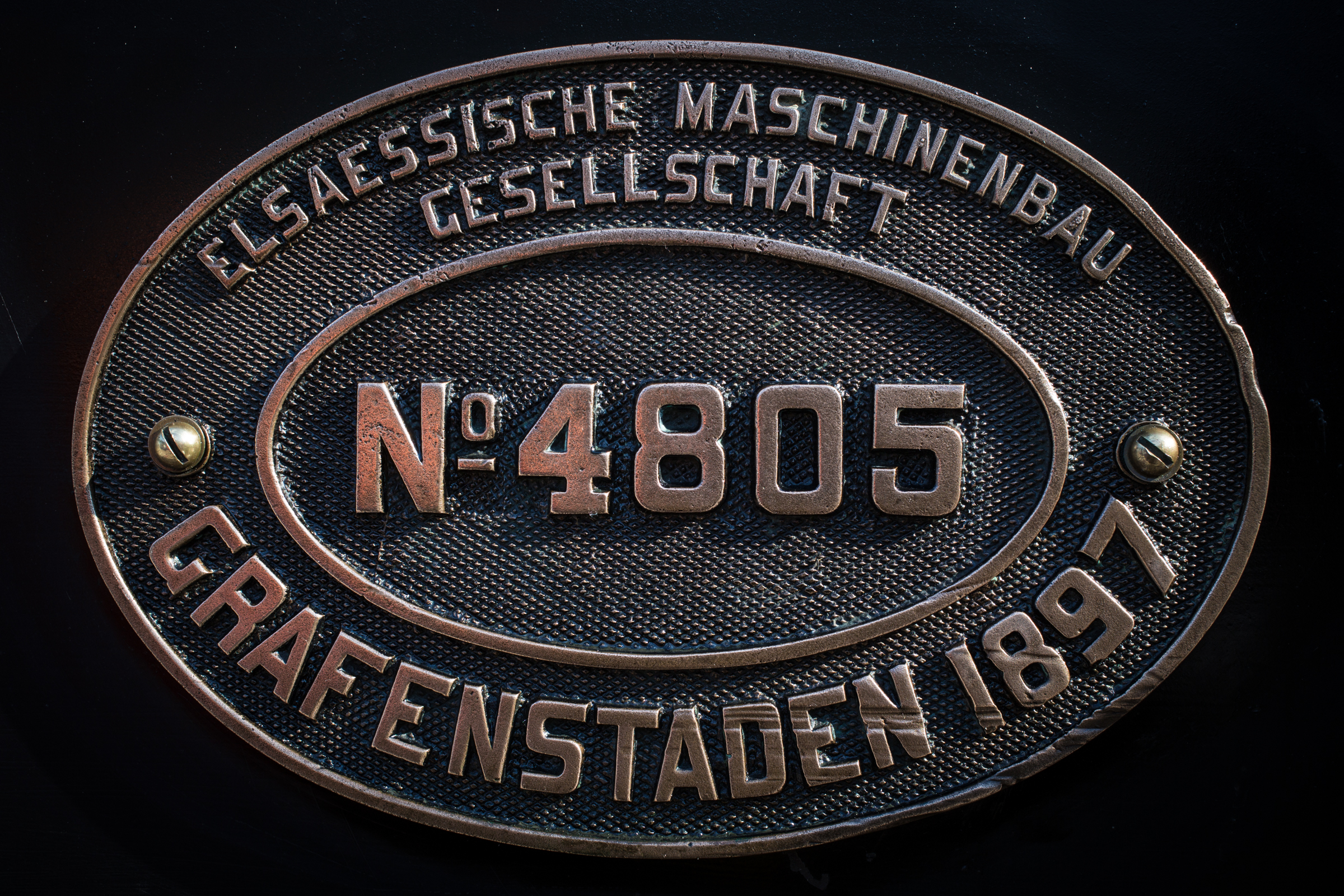
Builder's plate Elsaessische Maschinenbau Gesellschaft NR 4805.

The Elsässische Maschinenbau-Gesellschaft Grafenstaden (Alsatian Engineering Company in Grafenstaden) was a heavy industry firm located at Grafenstaden in the Alsace, near the city of Strasbourg.

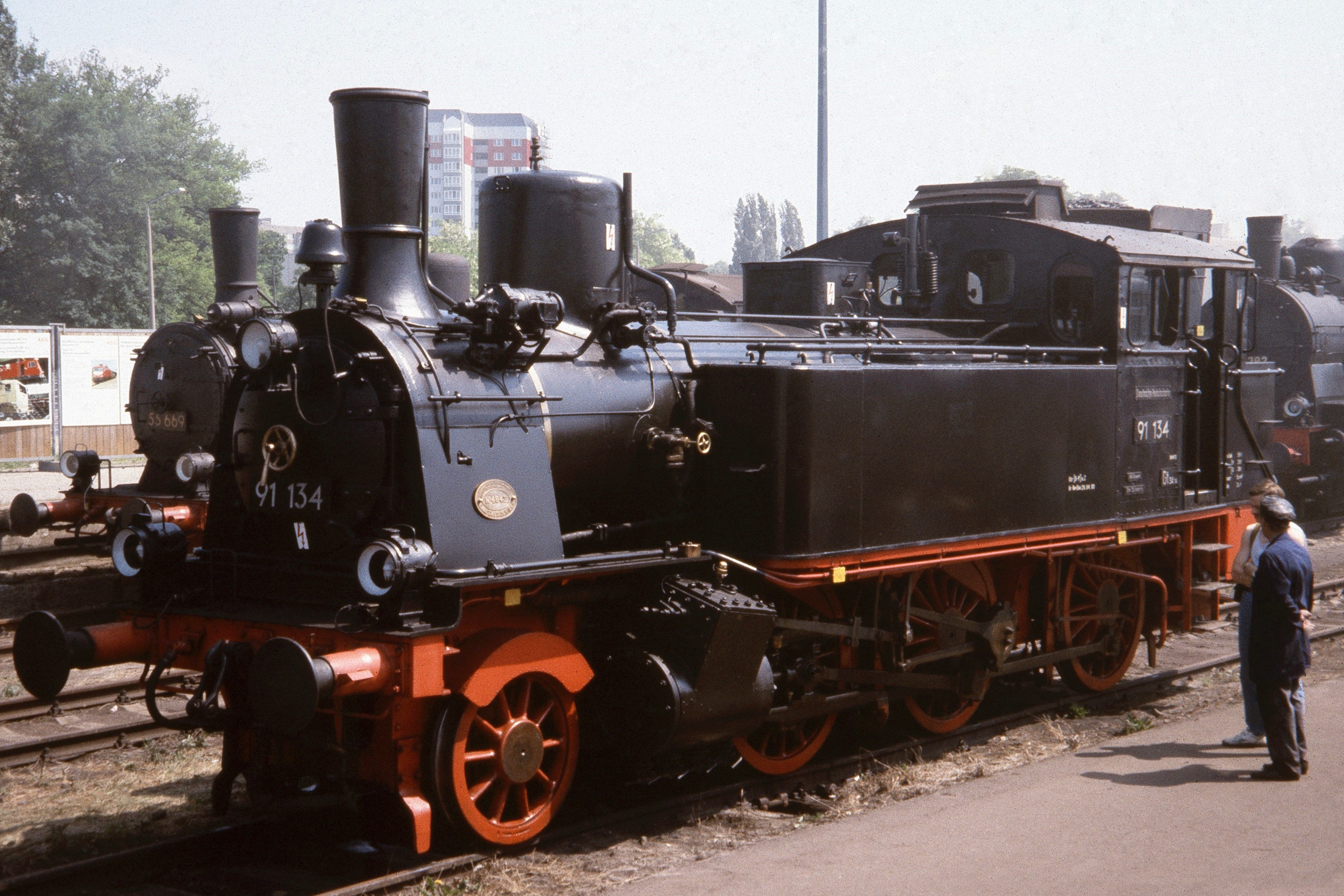
A Prussian T 9 built in 1898 with works number 4843 (later DRG 91 134)

In 1826, André Koechlin founded the engineering works of Andre Koechlin & Cie in Mulhouse, which made steam engines, turbines, spinning and weaving machinery and, from 1839, steam locomotives too. The subsequent history of the firm is closely linked to the history of Alsace-Lorraine. After losing the Franco-Prussian War of 1870/71, France had to withdraw from the so-called Reichsland and cede it to the German Empire. As a result, the company, now called the Elsässische Maschinenbaugesellschaft Andreas Köchlin & Cie. in Mülhausen and the Maschinenwerkstätte Rollé & Schwillgué in Strassburg-Grafenstaden found themselves inside the German Empire. In 1872 the two factories were merged into the Elsässischen Maschinenbau-Gesellschaft Grafenstaden.

The scale-making factory of "Rollé & Schwillgué", that predominantly made decimal weighing equipment based on the 1821 patent of a Benedictine monk, was bought in 1837 by the Strasbourg engineering company, which transferred the workshop with its work force of 40 employees one year later to Grafenstaden, a few kilometres south of Strasbourg. In 1846 they began the manufacture of tenders, and from 1856 locomotives as well.

After the takeover of Alsace-Lorraine by the German Empire in 1871, many Alsatians who considered themselves to be Frenchmen moved to the area around Belfort where, in 1872, the Société Alsacienne de Constructions Mécaniques (Alsatian Mechanical Engineering Company), SACM, was opened. After the peace treaty of Versailles in 1919 Alsace-Lorraine, and with it the Elsässische Maschinenbau-Gesellschaft Grafenstaden, returned to France, where the Grafenstaden firm was merged with the SACM. The factory in Belfort was worked until 1926 and taken over in 1928 by Thomson-Houston and Alsthom, the present-day firm of Alstom.

After the occupation of Alsace in 1941 the factory was forced to deliver Class 44 and Class 52 locomotives to the Deutsche Reichsbahn-Gesellschaft under the direction of the Magdeburger Werkzeugmaschinenfabrik (Magdeburg Machine Tool Factory), MWF. After World War II the factory was once again under French control.

In 1951 the first diesel locomotives were built in the factory and, in 1955, the manufacture of steam locomotives was halted. The production of diesel engines continued until 1965.

== Production figures ==
After the merger of the two factories in 1872 a common works numbering system was introduced, beginning with the number 2118, because Köchlin had built 1,412 locomotives to that point and Grafenstaden 705 locomotives. The manufacture of steam engines ended with locomotive works number 8174. Because eleven works numbers were not used, the combined company SACM must have built 6,042 steam locomotives.

The diesel engines built from 1951 to 1965 were given their own numbers starting from 10001 and 20001. These locomotives were supplied to the Saar Railway amongst others, that later ended up in the Deutsche Bundesbahn. In the 10,000 range, mainly engines with a B-dh axle arrangement, the works number 10199 was reached. Of the 20,000 series, with a C-dh axle arrangement, only 23 engines were made.

== See also ==
- Alsace-Lorraine
- Imperial Railways in Alsace-Lorraine
- List of Alsace-Lorraine locomotives
