= Prussian G 5.1 =

Prussian G 5.1 DRG Class 54.0 PKP Class Ti1 AL Class G5.1 SNCB Type 75
Type and origin
- Builder: Berliner Maschinenbau (41); AG Vulcan Stettin (33); Hanomag (12); Henschel & Sohn (41); Schichau-Werke (65); Maschinenbau Anstalt Humboldt (57); Arnold Jung Lokomotivfabrik (15)
- Build date: 1892—1902
- Total produced: 264
Specifications
- Configuration
  - Whyte: 2-6-0
- Leading dia.: 1,000 mm (3 ft 3 3/8 in)
- Driver dia.: 1,350 mm (4 ft 5 1/8 in)
- Length
  - Over beams: 16,130 or 15,990 mm (52 ft 11 in or 52 ft 5 1/2 in)
- Height: 4,200 mm (13 ft 9 3/8 in)
- Axle load: 13.7 t (13.5 long tons; 15.1 short tons)
- Adhesive weight: 39.9 t (39.3 long tons; 44.0 short tons)
- Service weight: 48.5 t (47.7 long tons; 53.5 short tons)
- Water cap.: 10.5 or 12.0 m^{3} (10,500 or 12,000 L; 2,300 or 2,600 imp gal; 2,800 or 3,200 US gal)
- Boiler pressure: 10 or 12 bar (1.0 or 1.2 MPa; 150 or 170 lbf/in^{2})
- Heating surface
  - Firebox: 2.29 m^{2} (24.6 sq ft)
  - Evaporative: 137.00 m^{2} (1,474.7 sq ft)
- Cylinders: 2, outside
- Cylinder size: 450 or 480 mm (17 11/16 or 18 7/8 in)
- Piston stroke: 630 mm (24 13/16 in)
- Valve gear: Allan, inside
Performance figures
- Maximum speed: 65 km/h (40 mph)
Career
- Numbers: KPEV 4001—4150; DRG 54 001—071; PKP Ti1 1—28; AL 3994—4000
- Retired: 1930 (DRG)

The Prussian Class G 5.1 steam engines were the first 2-6-0 goods locomotives in Europe. They were developed for the Prussian state railways from the Class G 4 and a total of no less than 264 units of this class were placed in service in Prussia between 1892 and 1902. The twin-cylinder G 5.1 had been designed to raise the speed of goods trains on main lines. In addition, more powerful engines were needed for the increasingly heavy train loads. The locomotives, which were equipped with a compressed air brake, were used in charge of fast goods trains (Eilgüterzugdienst) and also passenger trains due to their impressive top speed of 65 km/h. The G 5.1 was fitted with inside Allan valve gear and the carrying wheels were of the Adams axle design. The engines were coupled with tenders of Class pr 3 T 12. In Prussian service they were renumbered in 1905 into the 4001–4150 range.

The Reichsbahn inherited 169 G 5.1s after the First World War, which were designated class 54.0-1 in the DRG renumbering plan for steam locomotives; however by 1925 only 71 units, 54 001—54 071, had been renumbered. The locomotives were all retired by 1930.

The Polish State Railways received 28 units after the Great War, initially retaining their Prussian running numbers, and in 1925 they were designated Ti1 and numbered 1–28. During the Third Silesian Uprising at least three, 4003, 4160, and 4185, were fitted with armour and used for Polish armoured trains; after returning to civilian use, the armour was removed and they were designated class G5.3 (Ti3 after 1925); it is possible that the latter two were not in fact G 5.1s. Retirement of the class began in 1936, and by 1939 only six remained in operation. Of these, three were captured by the Germans and impressed into Reichsbahn service as 54 601–603. Of these, only one - 54 601 (ex Ti1-15, née Danzig 4002, built by Schichau w/n 1113/1900) was returned to Poland on 29 September 1955 and immediately scrapped.

28 G 5.1s went to Belgium as Belgian State Railways Type 75, two were already withdrawn in 1921 and only nine were allocated new numbers in 1925, the last ones were withdrawn in 1929. Another seven went to France to the Administration des chemins de fer d'Alsace et de Lorraine (AL) which designated them class G 5.1 and numbered them 3994—4000; they were all passed on to the William Luxembourg Railway (fr) before the AL was merged into the SNCF in 1938.

== See also ==
- Prussian state railways
- List of Prussian locomotives and railbuses
