= Maschinenbau Anstalt Humboldt =

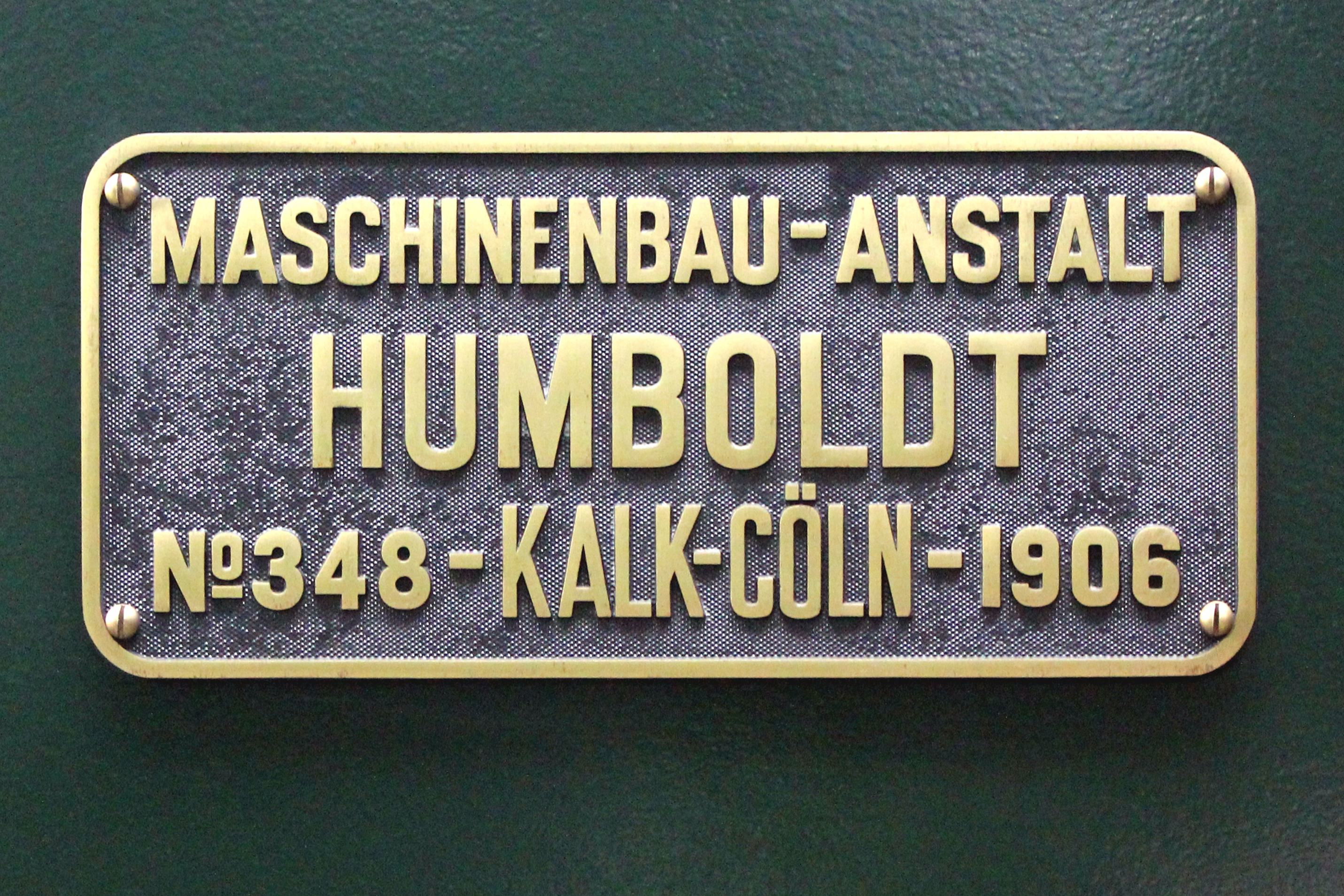
Manufacturer's plate from a Mallet locomotive, that Humboldt built in 1906 for the Brohl Valley Railway

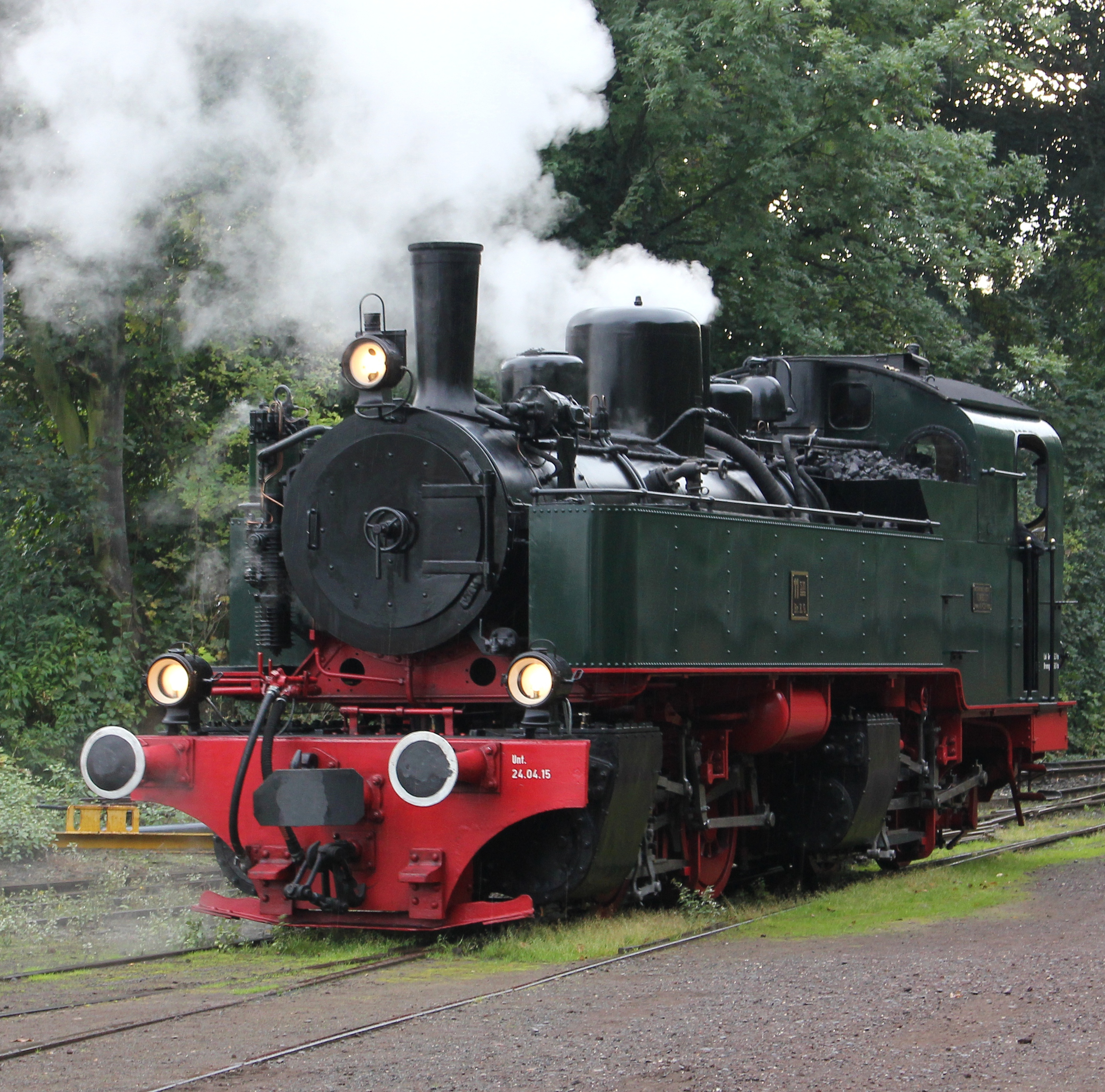
A Mallet locomotive built by Humboldt

The Maschinenbauanstalt Humboldt was a German mechanical engineering firm in Cologne-Kalk and a precursor to the firm of Deutz AG. It was founded in 1871 as Maschinenbau A.G. Humboldt, liquidated due to debts in 1884 and reformed as Maschinenbauanstalt Humboldt A.G..

Its predecessor was a company run by Wimmar Breuer, who had manufactured perforated plate in Kalk since 1853. It was expanded in 1856 by Breuer and shareholders, Neuerburg and Sievers, into the Maschinenfabrik für den Bergbau von Sievers & Co. at Kalk near Deutz am Rhein.

In 1896, under the name of Maschinenbauanstalt Humboldt, locomotive construction was begun. To that end, the site of a bankrupt engineering works in Güstrow was procured and, on 24 September 1898, the first steam locomotive was delivered. Amongst others, the company built 81 units of the Prussian S 6 locomotive from 1911 to 1913 as well as some 77 units of various Prussian G 5 locomotive variants.

On 22 December 1924 a shareholding agreement was concluded with the Gasmotoren-Fabrik Deutz AG. In 1925 the Öllokomotivenbau (Oil Locomotive Works) resulted, in which Humboldt, the Gasmotoren-Fabrik Deutz and the locomotive works of Henschel & Sohn at Kassel had shares. After building just one locomotive, however, the company was dissolved again in 1928. That same year Humboldt ceased locomotive production, after having delivered over 1700 locomotives, due to a lack of orders. On 17 October 1930, Humboldt merged with the Gasmotoren-Fabrik Deutz to form Humboldt-Deutz-Motoren. In 1938 the Isselburger Hütte was taken over, and a deal with the Klöckner Werke resulted in the famous name of Klöckner-Humboldt-Deutz (KHD). Today part of that name still appears in the firm KHD Humboldt Wedag International, a cement plant and equipment supplier that was formerly part of Deutz AG.

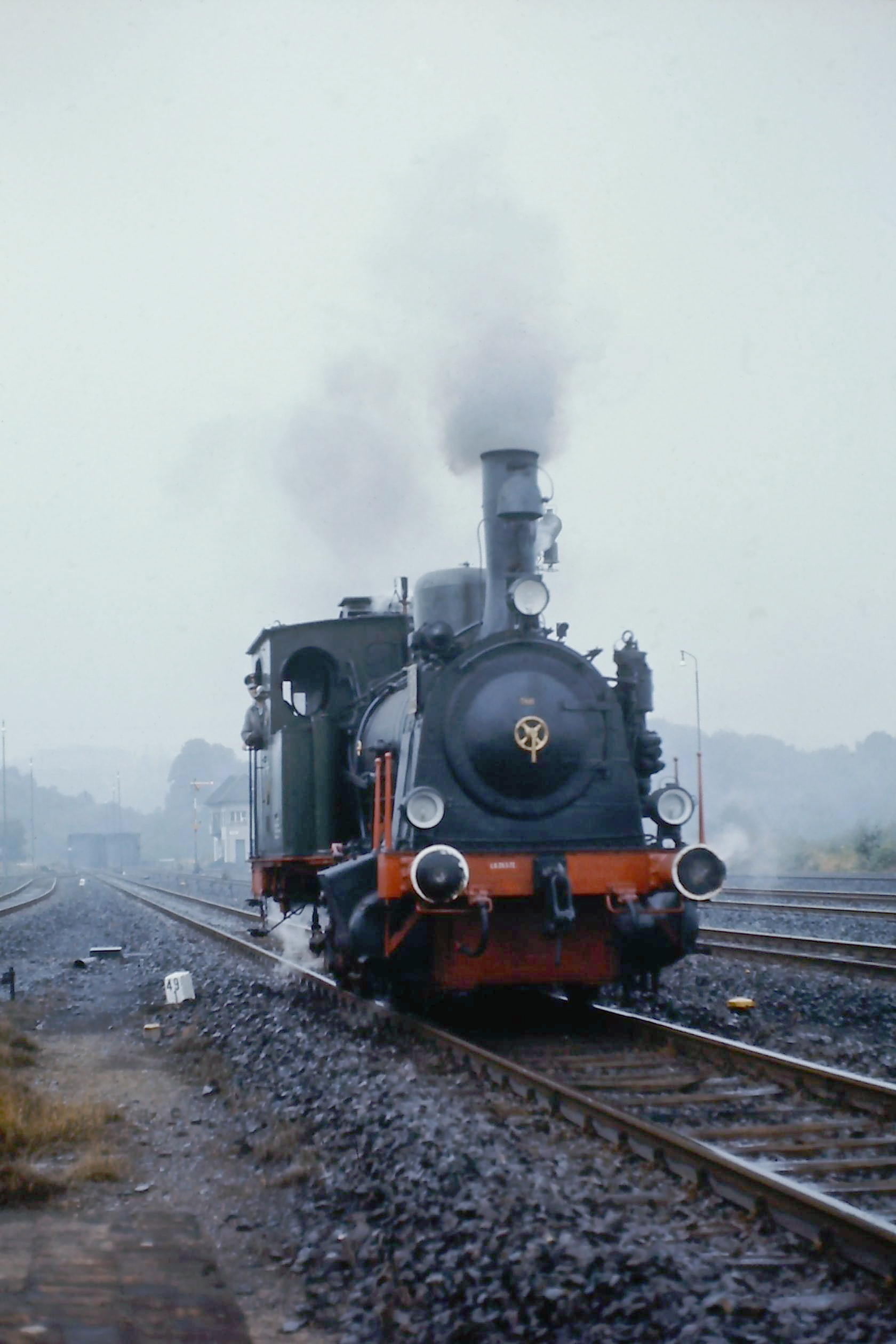
Factory number 210
Walsum 5

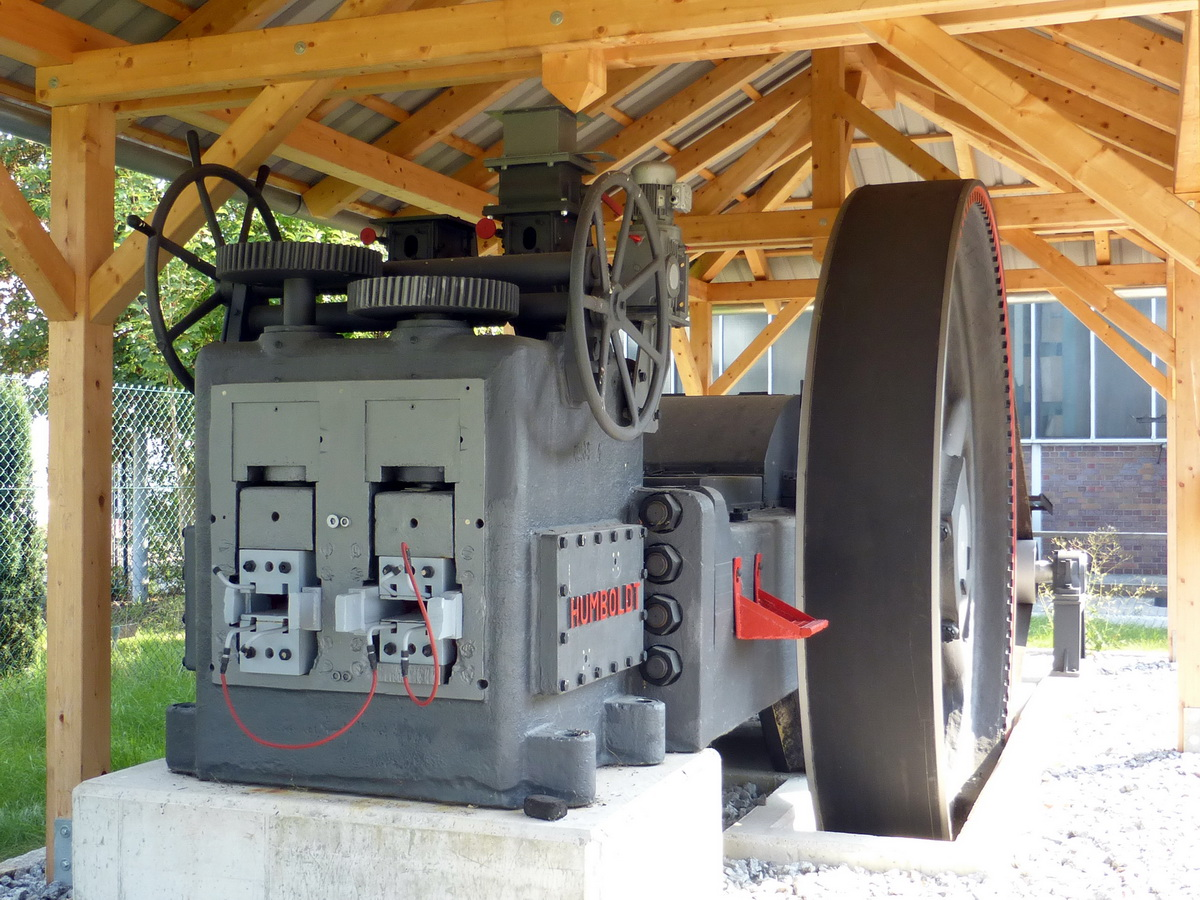
Compactor for producing lignite briquets, displayed in Wackersdorf

== External link and Source ==
- Company history at werkbahn.de (in German)
- Documents and clippings about Maschinenbau Anstalt Humboldt in the 20th Century Press Archives of the ZBW
