= Imperial Railways in Alsace–Lorraine =

Railway in Alsace Lorraine, Luxembourg region

Kaiserliche Generaldirektion der Eisenbahnen in Elsaß-Lothringen (EL)
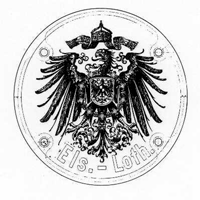

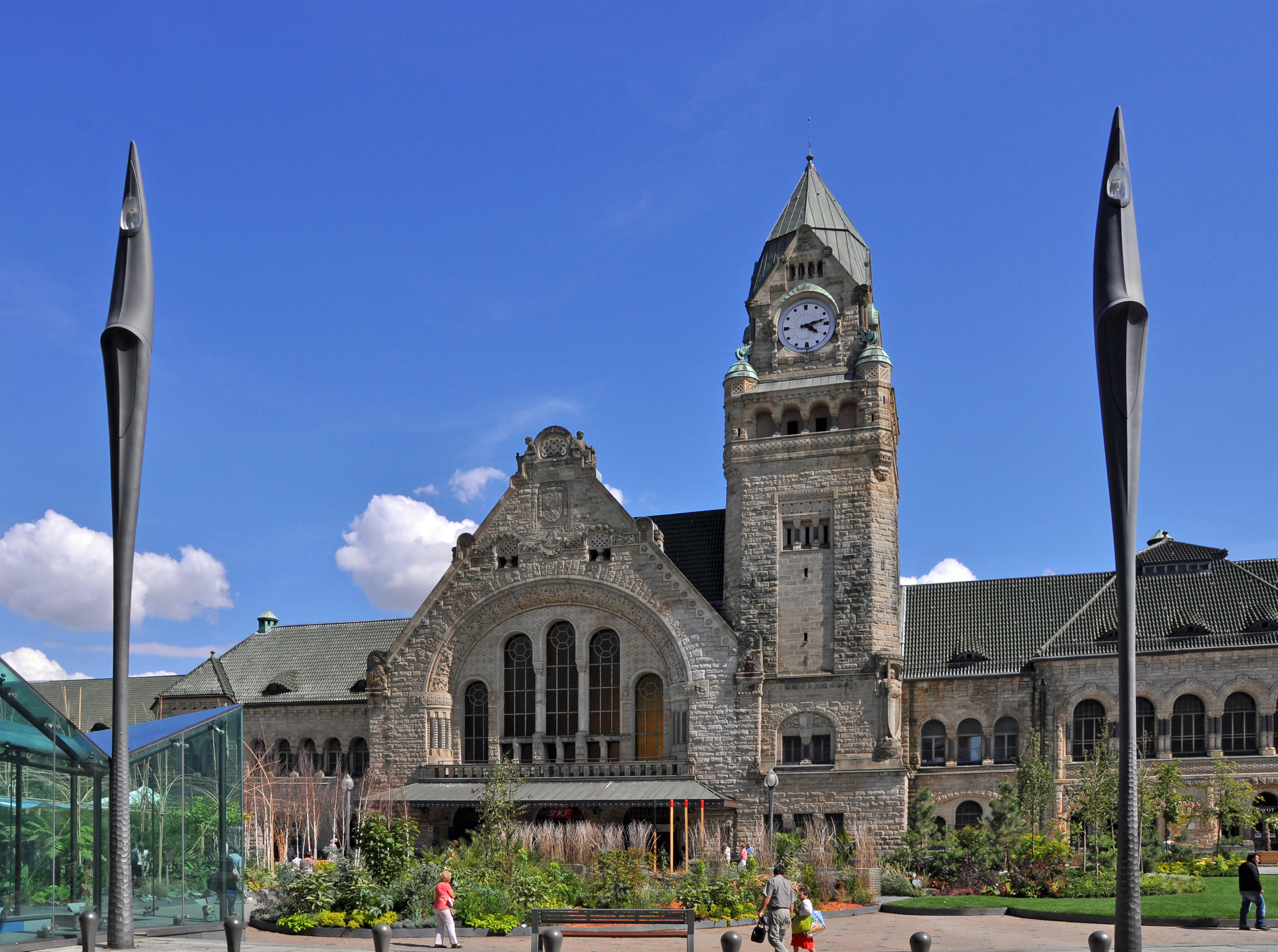
- The railway station of Metz (built in 1908)

Overview
- Locale: Alsace-Lorraine, Luxembourg
- Dates of operation: 1871–1918
- Successor: Administration des chemins de fer d'Alsace et de Lorraine

Technical
- Track gauge: 1,435 mm (4 ft 8 1/2 in) standard gauge 1,000 mm (3 ft 3 3/8 in) metre gauge
- Length: 2,079 km (1,292 mi) (1913)

The Kaiserliche Generaldirektion der Eisenbahnen in Elsaß-Lothringen or EL (English: General Directorate of the Imperial Railways in Alsace–Lorraine) were the first railways owned by the German Empire.

They emerged in 1871, after France had ceded the region of Alsace-Lorraine to the German Empire under the terms of the Peace Treaty of Frankfurt following the Franco-Prussian War. The railways of the private Compagnie des chemins de fer de l'Est (CF de l'Est; English: [French] Eastern Railway Company), with a total of 740 kilometres (460 mi) trackage, were formally purchased from the French and then sold again to the German Empire. The purchase price of 260 million Goldmarks was counted as compensation for the war.

The General Directorate of the Imperial Railways in Alsace-Lorraine (Kaiserliche Generaldirektion der Eisenbahnen in Elsaß-Lothringen) had its head office in Straßburg (now Strasbourg) and was subordinated directly to the Reich Chancellor. In 1878, however, it was re-subordinated to the newly created Imperial Ministry for the Management of Railways in Alsace-Lorraine in Berlin. The General Division managed six regional operating divisions, which had their headquarters in Mülhausen (now Mulhouse), Kolmar (Colmar), Straßburg I and II, Saargemünd (now Sarreguemines) and Metz. It was also responsible for a seventh region, with a headquarters in Luxemburg, which ran the operations of the Wilhelm Luxemburg Railway.

In the early days, railway vehicles were almost exclusively and forcibly taken from the German railways, because French troops had taken with them almost all rolling stock in the region during the retreat. The French side later built copies of German railway stock, mainly based on Prussian prototypes.

Railway operations were carried out, in principle, in accordance with the regulations of the Prussian state railways. Because the CF de l'Est were also the leaseholders of the Wilhelm Luxemburg Railway with a route length of 169 km (105 mi), the Imperial Railways took over the running of the network. An 18 km (11 mi) long railway line from Colmar to Münster (French Munster), which belonged to the town of Münster, was also purchased.

In the succeeding years the network was expanded significantly. Shortly before the start of the First World War (1912) the Imperial Railway network in Alsace-Lorraine had a total length of 2,100 km (1,300 mi), of which 78 km (48 mi) was narrow gauge (1,000 mm or 3 ft 3 3/8 in?). After the end of the war, these railways returned to France. Subsequently, the network of this region was managed independently again as the Administration des chemins de fer d'Alsace et de Lorraine until it merged into the Société nationale des chemins de fer français (SNCF) in 1938.

In Alsace and Moselle, many multi-track routes are still driven on the right, whereas in the rest of France they drive on the left.

== See also ==
- Alsace-Lorraine
- List of Alsace-Lorraine locomotives
- Alsace and Moselle railway network
