= Bavarian D III =

Type and origin
- Builder: Krauss
- Build date: 1873
- Total produced: 6
Specifications
- Configuration
  - Whyte: 0-4-0T
- Gauge: 1,435 mm (4 ft 8 1/2 in)
- Driver dia.: 985 mm (3 ft 2 3/4 in)
- Wheelbase
  - Overall: 2,450 mm (8 ft 1/2 in)
- Length
  - Over beams: 7,525 mm (24 ft 8 1/4 in)
- Axle load: 12.0 t (11.8 long tons; 13.2 short tons)
- Adhesive weight: 24.0 t (23.6 long tons; 26.5 short tons)
- Service weight: 24.0 t (23.6 long tons; 26.5 short tons)
- Fuel capacity: 1,350 kg (2,980 lb) coal
- Water cap.: 3.4 m^{3} (750 imp gal; 900 US gal)
- Boiler pressure: 10 kgf/cm^{2} (981 kPa; 142 lbf/in^{2})
- Heating surface
  - Firebox: 0.93 m^{2} (10.0 sq ft)
  - Evaporative: 58.0 m^{2} (624 sq ft)
- Cylinders: 2
- Cylinder size: 290 mm (11 7/16 in)
- Piston stroke: 540 mm (21 1/4 in)
- Valve gear: Allan, outside
Performance figures
- Maximum speed: 45 km/h (28 mph)
Career
- Numbers: K.Bay.Sts.E.: 566 WOLF to 571 GREIF
- Retired: by 1897

The Class D III engines of the Royal Bavarian State Railways (Königlich Bayerische Staatsbahn) were tank locomotives designed for shunting and Vizinalbahn service.

Georg Krauss had exhibited a locomotive of this type, which had been developed on the same design principles as the Bavarian B VII, at the 1873 Vienna World Exposition and sold it to the Bebra-Hanau Railway. The Bavarian State Railway also decided to procured the locomotive and order six for the same duties as those of the Maffei-built Bavarian D I class, which had been introduced in 1871.

The D I was equipped with an outside Allan valve gear and an enclosed driver's cab. Its coal and water tanks jutted out over the rear driving axle.

The locomotives were used partly for branch line service and partly for light shunting duties inter alia in Munich and Ingolstadt, and also at Lindau working with the ferries on Lake Constance. Because the engines could not attain the performance of the Bavarian D IV due to their simpler design, they were retired between 1894 and 1897. One engine was transferred to the Röthenbach–Weiler branch line and one to the Bavarian Cement Works at Marienstein, the rest were scrapped.

One engine was sold, the remainder had been retired and scrapped by 1897.

== See also ==
- Royal Bavarian State Railways
- List of Bavarian locomotives and railbuses
