= Bavarian A I =

Bavarian I
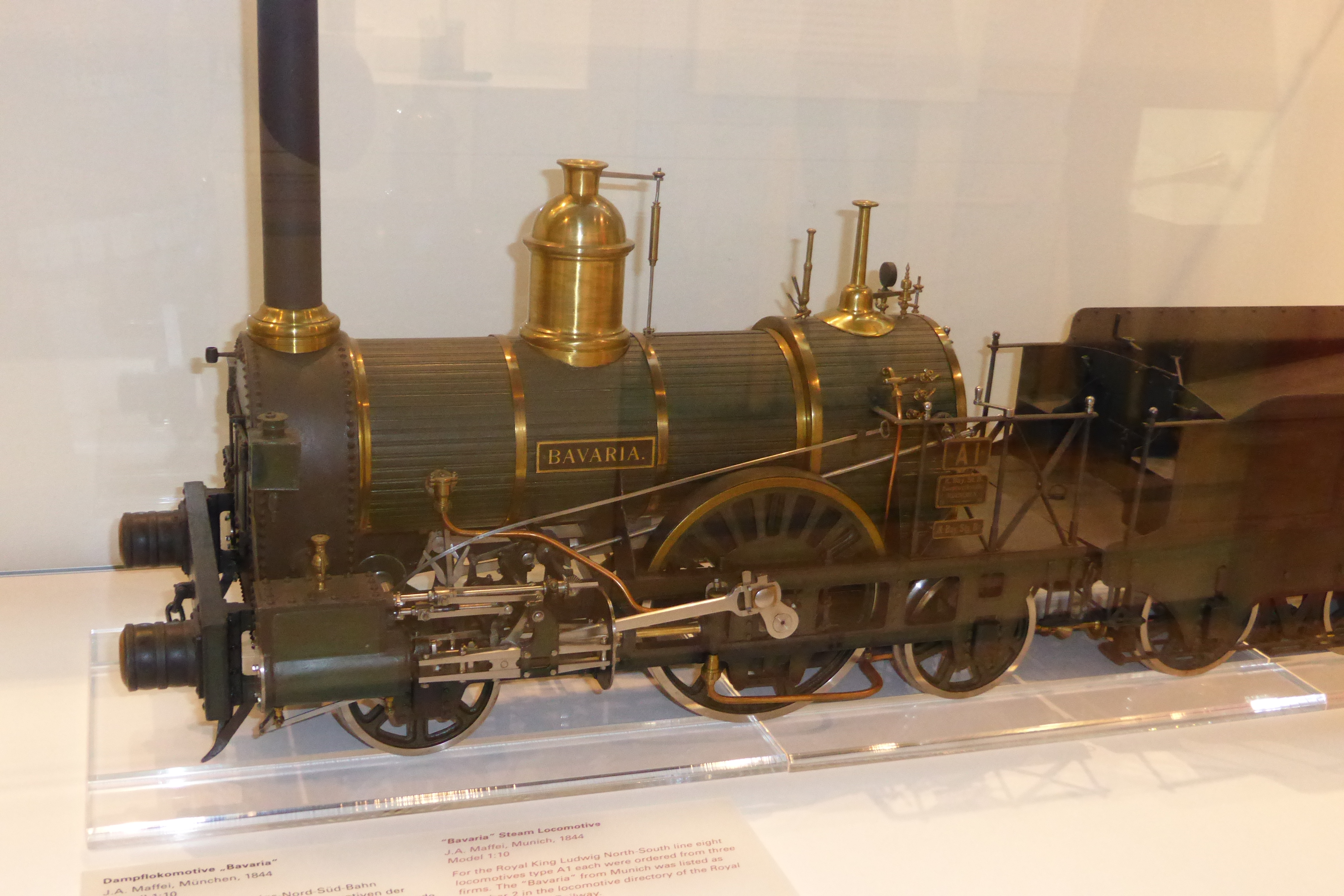
- Model of Bavaria, the first Maffei-built member of the class
Type and origin
- Power type: Steam
- Builder: Emil Keßler (8); Maffei (8); Meyer (8)
- Serial number: Keßler: 15–20, 26–27; Maffei: 2–7, 9, 8; Meyer: 11–14, 17–20
- Build date: 1844–1845
- Total produced: 24
Specifications
- Configuration
  - Whyte: 2-2-2
  - UIC: 1A1 n2
- Gauge: 1,435 mm (4 ft 8 1/2 in)
- Leading dia.: 914.5 mm (3 ft 0 in)
- Driver dia.: 1,524 mm (5 ft 0 in)
- Trailing dia.: 914.5 mm (3 ft 0 in)
- Wheelbase
  - Axle spacing (Asymmetrical): 2,006 mm (6 ft 7 in) +; 1,384 mm (4 ft 6 1/2 in)
  - Engine: 3,390 mm (11 ft 1 1/2 in)
  - Tender: 1,780 mm (5 ft 10 1/8 in)
  - incl. tender: 6,825 mm (22 ft 4 3/4 in)
- Length
  - Over buffers: 9,798 mm (32 ft 1 3/4 in)
- Adhesive weight: 6.83 t (6.72 long tons; 7.53 short tons)
- Service weight: 17.14 t (16.87 long tons; 18.89 short tons)
- Tender type: 2 T 3,35
- Fuel capacity: 600 kg (1,300 lb)
- Water cap.: 3.35 m^{3} (740 imp gal; 880 US gal)
- Firebox
  - Grate area: 0.76 m^{2} (8.2 sq ft)
- Boiler
  - Tube plates: 2,895 mm (9 ft 6 in)
  - Small tubes: 46 mm (1 13/16 in), 111 off
- Boiler pressure: 6.0 bar (6.12 kgf/cm^{2}; 87.0 lbf/in^{2})
- Heating surface
  - Firebox: 4.83 m^{2} (52.0 sq ft)
  - Tubes: 41.62 m^{2} (448.0 sq ft)
  - Total surface: 46.45 m^{2} (500.0 sq ft)
- Cylinders: Two, outside
- Cylinder size: 305 mm × 508 mm (12 in × 20 in)
Performance figures
- Maximum speed: 40 km/h (25 mph)
- Indicated power: 130 PS (96 kW; 130 hp)
Career
- Operators: Royal Bavarian State Railways
- Numbers: K.Bay.Sts.E.: 1–24 (named)
- Retired: 1874

Bavarian A I engines were German steam locomotives in service with the Royal Bavarian State Railways (Königlich Bayerische Staatsbahn) from 1841 to 1871.

Three manufacturers were awarded a contract to build eight locomotives each, with the stipulation that the components of the different machines had to be interchangeable with one another. The engines achieved a speed of 33 km/h on a line with an incline of 1:200. The first engine was retired in 1871 and scrapped. Five examples were rebuilt into B I class 2-4-0 locomotives, four were rebuilt into C I class 0-6-0 locomotives, and four were sold. The last one was scrapped in 1874.

They were coupled with 2 T 3,35 tenders.

== Der Münchner ==
Der Münchner
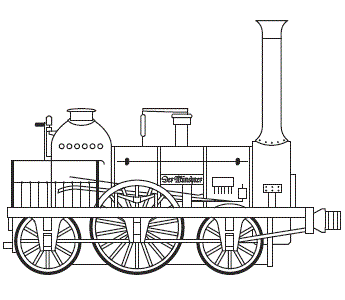
Type and origin
- Power type: Steam
- Builder: Maffei
- Serial number: 1
- Build date: 1841
- Total produced: 1
Specifications
- Configuration
  - Whyte: 2-2-2
- Gauge: 1,435 mm (4 ft 8 1/2 in)
- Leading dia.: 915 mm (3 ft 0 in)
- Driver dia.: 1,524 mm (5 ft 0 in)
- Trailing dia.: 915 mm (3 ft 0 in)
- Length
  - Over buffers: 9,739 mm (31 ft 11 7/16 in)
- Adhesive weight: 6.8 t (6.7 long tons; 7.5 short tons)
- Service weight: 13.8 t (13.6 long tons; 15.2 short tons)
- Water cap.: 3.0 m^{3} (660 imp gal; 790 US gal)
- Firebox
  - Grate area: 0.93 m^{2} (10.0 sq ft)
- Boiler pressure: 6 kgf/cm^{2} (588 kPa; 85.3 lbf/in^{2})
- Heating surface: 46.00 m^{2} (495.1 sq ft)
- Cylinders: Two
- Cylinder size: 305 mm × 457 mm (12 in × 18 in)
Performance figures
- Maximum speed: 59 km/h (37 mph)
- Indicated power: 100 PS (74 kW; 99 hp)
Career
- Operators: Munich–Augsburg Railway Company; Royal Bavarian State Railways
- Numbers: K.Bay.Sts.E.: 25
- Retired: 1871

Der Münchner (a Münchner is a man from Munich) was a Bavarian Class A I engine with the number 25. It was originally built for the Munich–Augsburg Railway Company, a private railway company which ran the route between Munich and Augsburg. In 1844 the line was taken over by the state railway and the engine was transferred into state ownership. A large part of the locomotive came from England, which can be seen from the typically English 'pear' shape of the outer firebox.

It was coupled with a 2 T 3 tender.

== See also ==
- List of Bavarian locomotives and railbuses
