= List of Bavarian locomotives and railbuses =

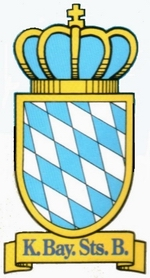
Coat of Arms of the Royal Bavarian State Railways

This List covers the locomotives and railbuses of the Bavarian railways, excluding those of the Palatinate (Pfalz). The locomotives and railbuses of the Palatinate when it belonged to Bavaria are in the List of Palatine locomotives and railbuses.

== Locomotives of the Bavarian Ludwigbahn (Bayerische Ludwigsbahn) ==
see: Bavarian Ludwigsbahn

== Locomotives of the Munich-Augsburg Railway Company (München-Augsburger Eisenbahn-Gesellschaft) ==
Name	Bavarian Class	Quantity	Year of Manufacture	Type	Remarks
JUPITER and JUNO	none	2	1837	1A1 n2	supplied by Robert Stephenson and Company
VESTA and VENUS	none	2	1838	1A1 n2	supplied by Sharp, Roberts and Company
VULKAN and MARS	none	2	1838	1A1 n2	supplied by Fenton, Murray and Jackson
MERKUR and DIANA	none	2	1841	1A1 n2	supplied by Robert Stephenson and Company

== Locomotives of the Royal Bavarian State Railways ==
=== Designation of State Railway Locomotives ===
==== Names and numbers of locomotives ====
In the beginning, locomotives of the Royal Bavarian State Railways were given names. The locomotive name was displayed in raised capital letters on a brass plate on the side of the boiler or, in the case of tank locomotives, on the side of the water tank.

Locomotives were given the names of both Bavarian and foreign places, rivers, lakes and mountains, the names of important people from art and science, as well as the names of literary and mythological figures. Even a few animal names were used.

Examples: BAVARIA, WÜRZBURG, ALTMÜHL, FUNTENSEE, WATZMANN, COPERNICUS, FAUST, ODYSSEUS, PANTHER

Locomotives with names were also given a so-called inventory number that was displayed in small figures on the chimney and on the rear wall of the tender or, in the case of tank engines, on the rear wall of the driver's cab.

Inventory numbers ran in sequence on new locomotives entering service, regardless of class or type. Names and inventory numbers of withdrawn locomotives were usually reallocated to newly delivered machines. The name plates were then re-used.

Example: The Class C IV PASING 113, built in 1889, received the name and inventory number of a Class A V mustered out that year.

Names and inventory numbers were used for the last time in 1892. The state railway then went over to railway or running numbers, whereby locomotives of the same class or type were reserved a specified sequential range of numbers. The assignment of number ranges did not follow any recognisable logic. The number plates were designed in the same way and displayed in the same places as the name plates.

==== Older classification scheme ====
The older classification scheme introduced in 1847 divided the locomotives into five groups differentiated by capital letters:

- A – Locomotives with one driven axle
- B – Locomotives with two coupled axles
- C – Locomotives with three coupled axles
- D – Tank locomotives
- E – Locomotives with four coupled axles

Locomotive classes were indicated with Roman numerals after the letter; these numbers ran in the same sequence as the introduction of the locomotives classes into service. There was no distinction between locomotives used for different purposes.

Example: Bavarian B V, Bavarian D XI

Because there were only locomotives with one, two or three driven axles at the time when this classification system was introduced, they were given the letters A, B and C respectively. When tank engines were brought into service in 1871, the use of four coupled axles was still not conceivable, so tank locomotives were given the class letter D. However, when goods train locomotives with four coupled axles then appeared towards the end of the 19th century, they had, absurdly, to be given the designation E I.

The system was further expanded in 1896 on the appearance of locomotives with separate running gear:

- AA – Locomotives with Vorspannachse (Locomotives with a driven axle and a raisable 'dolly axle' (Hilfsachse) to assist starting)
- BB – Mallet locomotives, which have two separate sets of coupled driving gear

Examples: AA I, Bavarian BB II

To differentiate between two-cylinder (Zwillings-) and compound (Verbund-) locomotives in the case of Classes B XI and C IV the class designation was supplemented with:

- Zw for locomotives with two-cylinder driving gear
- Vbd (also Vb or Verb) for locomotives with compound driving gear

Examples: B XI Zw, C IV Vbd

These additional letters were not inscribed on the engines themselves.

Narrow gauge locomotives for the only narrow gauge line in the state railways which then existed fell outside the boundaries of this system. These were given the abbreviation LE (for Lokalbahn Eichstätt) and Roman numerals from I to V. In addition these locomotives also displayed inventory numbers.

==== Classification scheme of 1901 ====
Because of technical advances and the requirements of railway operations, this scheme was no longer able to cope, so a new system was introduced in 1901.

This consisted of several elements:

A leading capital letter indicated the locomotive class:

- S – Schnellzuglokomotive = express train locomotive
- P – Personenzuglokomotive = passenger train locomotive
- G – Güterzuglokomotive = goods train locomotive
- R – Rangierlokomotive = shunting locomotive
- M – Motorwagen = rail motor vehicle
- E – elektrischer Antrieb = electric locomotive (from 1913, precedes the locomotive class)

The locomotive class could be elaborated on with one or more additional letters:

- t – Tenderlokomotive = tank locomotive (not used for shunting engines)
- z – Zahnradlokomotive = cogwheel locomotive
- s – Schmalspurlokomotive = narrow gauge locomotive
- L – Lokalbahn = branch line

Then followed the ratio of the coupled axles to the total number of axles, separated by a forward slash e. g. 3/5.

To distinguish between superheated and wet steam locomotives of the same class, an "H" or an "N" was added at the end of the classification.

Examples:

- So a Class S 3/6 meant an express engine (Schnellzuglokomotive) with 3 coupled axles and 6 axles in total – i.e. 3 carrying axles.
- The Pt 2/5 N is a passenger train tank engine (Personenzugtenderlokomotive) with 2 coupled axles and a total of 5 axles – i.e. 3 carrying axles – using wet or saturated steam (Naßdampfausführung.)
- EP 3/5 meant an electric passenger train locomotive (Elektrische Personenzuglokomotive) with 3 driven axles and 5 axles in all – i.e. two carrying axles.

The new classification system was only applied to those locomotives newly entering service. So up to 1920 two different classification systems existed together. With the foundation of the Deutsche Reichsbahn, later the Deutsche Reichsbahn-Gesellschaft (DRG) the Bavarian classification system was abolished.

=== Steam locomotives ===
==== Locomotives of the early period for all types of train ====
Class	Number(s)	Quantity	Year(s) of Manufacture	Type	Remarks
A I	names	24	1844–1845	1A1 n2	5 locos rebuilt into B I and 4 into C I
A I	DER MÜNCHNER	1	1841	1A1 n2	Maffei's first engine, purchased by the state railway in 1845
A II	names	13	1847–1848	1A1 n2	3 locos rebuilt into B I and 6 locos into C I
A III	names	4	1851–1852	1A1 n2	2 locos rebuilt into B I and 2 locos into C I
A IV	names	8	1852–1853	1A1 n2	1 loco rebuilt firstly into B I and then into C I
A V	names	24	1853–1855	1A1 n2	
B I	names	22	1847–1850	1B n2	
B I	names	(11)	(1859–1876)	1B n2	Rebuild from 5 A I, 3 A II, 2 A III and 1 A IV
B II	names	14	1851–1852	1B n2	
B III	names	18	1852–1855	1B n2	
B IV	names	10	1852–1853	1B n2	
B V	names	94	1853–1863	1B n2	
B V (Stütztender)	PHÖNIX	1	1857	B3′ n2	Stütztender locomotive with Engerth-like, articulated, 'supporting' tender.
C I	names	5	1847–1850	C n2	Pusher and header locomotive for the Schiefe Ebene ramp at Neuenmarkt–Marktschorgast
C I	names	(13)	(1869–1877)	C n2	Rebuild from 4 A I, 6 A II, 2 A III and 1 B I (ex A IV)
C II	HERCULES	1	1857	C2′ n2	Stütztender locomotives with Engerth-like, articulated, 'supporting' tender. Ca. 1870 modified to be similar to the standard type, the Class C II
C II	names	4	1858	C3′ n2	Stütztender locomotives with Engerth-like, articulated, 'supporting' tender. Ca. 1870 modified to be similar to the standard type, the Class C II

None of the locomotives were renumbered with a Deutsche Reichsbahn running number.

==== Passenger and express train locomotives ====
Class	Number(s)	DRG Number(s)	Quantity	Year(s) of Manufacture	Type	Remarks
B VI	names		107	1863–1871	1B n2	
B VII	names		6	1868	B n2	
B VIII	names		6	1872	1B n2	
B IX (1870)	names		4	1870	B1 n2	Strousberg type, sold to the Imperial Railways in Alsace-Lorraine in 1872
B IX	names		104	1874–1887	1B n2	
B X	names		12	1889–1891	1′B n2v	
B X	names		2	1891	1′B n2	Rebuilt into compound locomotive in 1896
B XI Zw	1201–1239	36 701–36 708	39	1892–1893	2′B n2	
B XI Vbd	1240–1339	36 751–36 826	100	1895–1900	2′B n2v	
C V	2301		1	1896	2′C n4v	Prototype with smaller driving wheel diameter (1640 mm)
C V	2302–2343	17 301–17 322	42	1899–1901	2′C n4v	
AA I	1400		1	1896	2′(a)A1 n2	With dolly axle, rebuilt into a 2′B h2 of Class P 2/4 in 1907 after an accident
S 2/5 (Baldwin)	2398–2399		2	1901	2′B1′ n4v	Bought from Baldwin (USA) for comparison purposes, four-cylinder, Vauclain compound driving gear
S 2/5	3001–3010	14 141–14 145	10	1904	2′B1 n4v	
S 2/6	3201	15 001	1	1906	2′B2′ h4v	
S 3/5 N	3301–3328, 3330–3340	17 401–17 420	39	1903–1907	2′C n4v	Rebuilt into a 2′C h4v in 1924/25
S 3/5 H	3329, 3341–3369	17 501–17 524	30	1906–1911	2′C h4v	
S 3/6	3601–3623, 3642–3644	18 401–18 421	26	1908–1927	2′C1′ h4v	Original design
S 3/6	3624–3641	18 441–18 458	18	1908–1927	2′C1′ h4v	The so-called "Hochhaxige" (high haunches?), driving wheel diameter 2000 mm
S 3/6	3645–3679	18 422–18 424, 18 461–18 478	35	1914–1918	2′C1′ h4v	Shorter wheelbase like the Palatine S 3/6
S 3/6	3680–3709	18 479–18 508	30	1923–1924	2′C1′ h4v	Follow-on order by the Bavarian Group Administration
S 3/6		18 509–18 548	40	1926–1930	2′C1′ h4v	DRG follow-on batch
P 2/4	1400	36 861	(1)	(1907)	2′B h2	Rebuild from AA I
P 3/5 N	3801–3836	38 001–38 013	36	1905–1907	2′C n4v	1924/25 Rebuilt into 2′C h4v
P 3/5 H	3837–3916	38 401–38 480	80	1921	2′C h4v	Follow-on order by the Bavarian Group Administration, with superheater

==== Goods train locomotives ====
Class	Number(s)	DRG Number(s)	Quantity	Year(s) of Manufacture	Type	Remarks
C II	names		68	1861–1868	C n2	Standard version of the C II
C III	names		239	1868–1879	C n2	
C III	names		14	1872–1874	C n2	Sigl design, like the MÁV III; modified to be similar to the other C III engines in 1895–1902
C IV Zw	names, 1401–1441, 1452–1462	53 8011–53 8064	87	1884–1892	C n2	
C IV Vbd	names, 1442–1451, 1463–1550	53 8081–53 8168	100	1889–1897	C n2v	
C VI	1551–1633	54 1301–54 1364	83	1899–1905	1′C n2v	
E I	2051–2062		12	1895–1896	1′D n2	Cylinder in front of the carrying axle
E I	2063–2064		2	1896–1897	1′D n4v	Four-cylinder, compound locomotive, Sondermann design, Rebuilt into 1′D n2 in 1899
E I	2065–2084, 2087–2099, 2116–2130		48	1899–1901	1′D n2	Cylinder behind the carrying axle
E I (Baldwin)	2085–2086		2	1899	1′D n4v	Bought from Baldwin (USA) for comparison purposes, four-cylinder Vauclain compound locomotive
BB I	2100		1	1896	B′B n4v	Articulated Mallet locomotive
G 3/4 N	1634–1670	54 1401–54 1432	37	1907–1909	1′C n2v	Continuation of the C VI
G 3/4 H	7001–7165	54 1501–54 1665	165	1919–1921	1′C h2	
G 3/4 H	7166–7225	54 1666–54 1725	60	1922–1923	1′C h2	Follow-on order by the Bavarian Group Administration
G 4/5 N	2131–2137	56 401–56 404	7	1905–1906	1′D n2	
G 4/5 H	5151–5160, 5501–5695, 5211–5235	56 801 – 56 809, 56 901–56 1035, 56 1101–56 1125	230	1915–1919	1′D h4v	5151–5160 ordered for MGD Brussels and 5211–5235 for MGD Warsaw; both series taken over by Bavaria
G 5/5	5801–5815	57 501–57 507	15	1911	E h4v	
G 5/5	5816–5895	57 511–57 590	80	1920–1924	E h4v	Follow-on order by the Bavarian Group Administration

==== Tank locomotives ====
Class	Number(s)	DRG Number(s)	Quantity	Year(s) of Manufacture	Type	Remarks
D I	names		15	1871–1875	B n2t	
D II (old)	names		4	1873	B n2t	
D II	2400–2472	89 601–89 670	73	1898–1904	C n2t	
D III	names		6	1873	B n2t	
D IV	names, 1701–1737	88 7101–88 7201	132	1875–1897	B n2t	
D V	names	89 8101–89 8110	10	1877–1878	C n2t	
D IX	names, 1931–1960, 2101–2115	70 7102–70 7154	55	1888–1899	1B n2t	
D XII	2201–2296	73 031–73 124	96	1897–1904	1′B2′ n2t	
Pt 2/3	6001–6097	70 001–70 097	97	1909–1916	1B h2t	
Pt 2/4 N	6501–6502	72 101–72 102	2	1909	2′B n2t	
Pt 2/4 H	5001–5012	71 201–71 212	12	1906–1909	1′B1′ h2t	
Pt 2/5 N	5202–5210	73 131–73 139	9	1907	1′B2′ n2t	Continuation of the D XII
Pt 2/5 H	5201	73 201	1	1906	1′B2′ h2t	As the D XII, with superheater
Pt 3/6	6101–6110	77 110–77 119	10	1923	1′C2′ h2t	As the Palatine Pt 3/6, follow-on order by the Bavarian Group Administration
Gt 2x4/4	5751–5765	96 001–96 015	15	1913–1914	D′D h4vt	
Gt 2x4/4	5766–5775	96 016–96 025	10	1922–1923	D′D h4vt	Follow-on order by the Bavarian Group Administration
R 3/3	2473–2490	89 701–89 717	18	1906–1913	C n2t	Continuation of the D II
R 3/3	4701–4790	89 801–89 890	90	1921–1922	C n2t	Follow-on order by the Bavarian Group Administration
R 4/4	4151–4183	92 2008–92 2040	33	1918–1919	D n2t	As the Palatine R 4/4
R 4/4	4184–4192	92 2041–2049	9	1924–1925	D n2t	Follow-on order by the Bavarian Group Administration

==== Lokalbahn (branch line) locomotives ====
Class	Number(s)	DRG Number(s)	Quantity	Year(s) of Manufacture	Type	Remarks
D VI	names, 1801–1804	98 7501–98 7526	53	1880–1894	B n2t	
D VII	names, 1851–1874	98 7601–98 7614, 98 7621–98 7681	75	1880–1895	C n2t	
D VIII	names, 1901–1905	98 661–98 669	10	1888–1893	C1′ n2t	Earlier D VIII, for Reichenhall–Berchtesgaden
D VIII	1906–1914	98 671–98 679	9	1898–1903	C1′ n2t	Later D VIII
D X	names, 1961–1963	98 7701–98 7709	9	1890–1893	C1′ n2t	
D XI	1991–2050, 2701–2761, 2765–2782	98 411–98 423, 98 431–98 556	139	1895–1912	C1′ n2t	
BB II	2501–2531	98 701–98 731	31	1899–1908	B′B n4vt	Articulated Mallet locomotive
PtL 2/2 (Maffei)	4001–4024		24	1906–1908	B h4t	Maffei design, counter-rotating, driving gear; formerly the ML 2/2
PtL 2/2 (Krauss)	4501–4506		6	1905–1906	B h2t	Krauss design, internal cylinder and jackshaft; formerly ML 2/2
PtL 2/2 (Krauss)	4507–4535	98 301–98 309	29	1908–1909	B h2t	Krauss design, jackshaft
PtL 2/2 (Krauss)	4536–4548	98 310–98 322	13	1911–1914	B h2t	Krauss design, standard driving gear
PtL 3/3	1875–1876	98 7691–98 7691	2	1889	C n2t	Taken over in 1908 by the LAG along with the Murnau–Garmisch line, similar to the D VII
PtL 3/4	2762–2764	98 561–98 563	3	1900	C1′ n2t	Taken over in 1908 by the LAG along with the Murnau–Garmisch line, similar to the D XI
PtL 3/4	2783–2787	98 564–98 568	5	1914	C1′ n2t	Continuation of the D XI
PtzL 3/4	4101–4103	97 101–97 103	3	1912	Czz1′ h2(4v)t	Rack railway locomotive, for Erlau–Wegscheid line
PtzL 3/4	4104	97 104	1	1923	Czz1′ h2(4v)t	Follow-on order by the Bavarian Group Administration
GtL 4/4	2551–2563	98 801–98 813	13	1911–1914	D h2t	
GtL 4/4	2564–2650	98 814–98 900	87	1921–1924	D h2t	Follow-on order by the Bavarian Group Administration
GtL 4/4		98 901–98 917	17	1927	D h2t	DRG follow-on batch
(GtL 4/5)		98 1001–98 1045	45	1929–1933	D1′ h2t	New DRG series, development of the GtL 4/4

==== Narrow gauge locomotives ====
Class	Number(s)	DRG Number(s)	Quantity	Year(s) of Manufacture	Type	Remarks
LE	I–V	99 071–99 075	5	1885–1900	C n2t	For Eichstätt–Kinding
Pts 3/4	1101–1103	99 131–99 132	3	1906	1′C h2t	For Neuötting–Altötting, no. 1102 was lost on the eastern front in First World War
Pts 3/4	1104	99 133	1	1923	1′C h2t	Substitute order by the Bavarian Group Administration
Gts 4/4	991	99 151	1	1909	D n2t	For Eichstätt–Kinding
Gts 2x3/3	996	99 201	1	1917	C′C h4vt	Acquired in 1920 from the military field railway fleet, for Eichstätt–Kinding

All Bavarian narrow gauge locomotives were built for meter gauge.

==== Modification of Bavarian steam locomotives by the Deutsche Reichsbahn and Deutsche Bundesbahn ====
Locomotives of two Bavarian classes underwent major modification by the Deutsche Reichsbahn and Deutsche Bundesbahn. Although the rebuilds took place decades after the end of the Royal Bavarian State Railways, these locomotives displayed unmistakable Bavarian features and were designated even in railway administrative documents with (unofficial) Bavarian class names.

Class	Number(s)	DRG Number(s)	Quantity	Year(s) of Manufacture	Type	Remarks
(S 3/6)		18 601–18 630	(30)	(1953–1956)	2′C1′ h4v	DB rebuild from 18.4–5 (S 3/6) with high-performance boiler
(GtL 4/5)		98 1101–1129	(29)	(1934–1941)	1′D h2t	DRG rebuild from 98.8–9 (GtL 4/4) with front carrying axle

=== Electric locomotives ===
Class	Number(s)	DRG Number(s)	Quantity	Year(s) of Manufacture	Type	Remarks
ES 1	21001–21010	E 16 01–E 16 10	10	1925	1′Do1′ w4e	Ordered by the Bavarian Group Administration
ES 1		E 16 11–E 16 21	11	1928–1933	1′Do1′ w4e	DRG follow-on batch
EP 1 to 1920: EP 3/5	20001–20005	E 62 01–E 62 05	5	1912	1′C1′ w1k	For Garmisch–Griesen
EP 2	20006–20034	E 32 06–E 32 34	29	1924–1926	1′C1′ w2u	Ordered by the Bavarian Group Administration; 8 locos in 1935/36 after raising the top speed redesignated as E 32 101–E 32 108
EP 3 to 1920: EP 3/6	20101–20104	E 36 01–E 36 04	4	1914	1′C2′ w1k	For Freilassing–Berchtesgaden
EP 4 to 1920: EP 3/6^{II}	20121–20124	E 36 21–E 36 24	4	1914	1′C2′ w1k	For Freilassing–Berchtesgaden
EP 5	21501–21535	E 52 01–E 52 35	35	1924–1925	2′BB2′ w4u	Ordered by the Bavarian Group Administration
EG 1 to 1920: EG 4x1/1	20201–20202	E 73 01–E 73 02	2	1914–1915	Bo′Bo′ w4t	For Freilassing–Berchtesgaden
EG 2 to 1920: EG 2x2/2	20221–20222	E 70 21–E 70 22	2	1920	B′B′ w2u	For Freilassing–Berchtesgaden
EG 3	22001–20222	E 77 01–E 77 31	31	1924–1925	(1′B)(B1′) w2u	Ordered by the Bavarian Group Administration, identical design to Prussian EG 701–EG 725
(EG 4)	(22101–22102)	E 79 01–E 79 02	2	1926–1927	2′D1′ w2u	Ordered by the Bavarian Group Administration, for Freilassing–Berchtesgaden; already supplied with DRG numbers
EG 5	22501–22520	E 91 01–E 91 20	20	1924–1927	C′C′ w4u	Ordered by the Bavarian Group Administration, identical design to Prussian EG 581–EG 594

Some of the Class ES 1 (E 16) and EG 5 (E 91) locomotives ordered with Bavarian class designations and locomotive numbers may have been supplied with DRG numbers.

=== Railbuses ===
Class	Number(s)	DRG Number(s)	Quantity	Year(s) of Manufacture	Type	Remarks
MCi	8373		(1)	(1901)	Bo g2t	Accumulator car, rebuild from a Ci coach built in 1887
MBCi	2521		1	1904	A1 n2v	De Dion-Bouton steam railbus
MCCi	14501–14507		7	1906–1909	B2′ h4	Steam railbus, engine like the PtL 2/2 (Maffei)
MBCL	101–109	to 1930: München 501–509; 1930 to 1941: 1481–1489 from 1941: ET 184 01–ET 184 09	9	1907–1909	Bo g2t	Electric railbus, for Berchtesgaden–state border and Königssee
MPL	1501	to 1941: München 601 from 1941: ET 194 01	1	1909	Bo g2t	Electric luggage railbus, for Berchtesgaden–state border and Königssee
D4ielT		to 1930: München 701–704; 1930 to 1941: 1101–1104 from 1941: ET 85 01–ET 85 04	(4)	(1924)	Bo′2′ w2t	Electric railbus, rebuilt by the Bavarian Group Administration from a former MCCi
D4ielT		to 1930: München 705–730; 1930 to 1941: 1105–1136 from 1941: ET 85 05–ET 85 36	32	1927–1933	Bo′2′ w2t	Electric railbus, DRG new series; development of the rebuilt ET 85

== Locomotives of the Bavarian Eastern Railway Company (Bayerische Ostbahn) ==
The classification scheme of the Bavarian Ostbahn was different from that of the state railway. The locomotives were also divided into five groups that were given capital letters.

- A – Locomotives with one driven axle
- B – Locomotives with two coupled axles and a carrying axle
- C – Locomotives with three coupled axles
- D – Tank locomotives
- E – Locomotives with two coupled axles, but no carrying axle

The Ostbahn did not differentiate between the individual classes with a special class number. Instead of that locomotives were numbered sequentially within a group. After nationalisation, the former Ostbahn locomotives were initially operated under their old numbers. Not until 1892 were they redesignated in accordance with the classification system of the state railway.

The initial use of names was soon given up again.

Ostbahn Number	State Railway Class	State Railway Number	Quantity	Year(s) of Manufacture	Axle arrangement	Remarks
A 1–A 12			12	1857–1858	2A n2	Crampton design, rebuilt into 1B n2 of the B 79–B 90 series
A 13–A 24			12	1859	1A1 n2	Stephenson design, rebuilt into 1B n2 of the B 67–B 78 series
A 1–A 2 to 1872: E 1–E 2	B V (Ostbahn)	1001–1002	2	1869	B n2	
B 1–B 66	B V (Ostbahn)	1003–1068	66	1858–1865	1B n2	
B 67–B 78	B IX (Ostbahn)	1069–1080	(12)	(1870–1871)	1B n2	Rebuilt from A 13–A 24, driving wheel diameter 1524 mm
B 79–B 90	B IX (Ostbahn)	1081–1092	(12)	(1869–1872)	1B n2	Rebuilt from A 1–A 12, driving wheel diameter 1829 mm (Loco B 79/1081: 1524 mm)
B 91–B 96	B IX (Ostbahn)	1093–1098	6	1872	1B n2	driving wheel diameter 1828 mm
B 97–B 109	B IX (Ostbahn)	1099–1111	13	1875	1B n2	driving wheel diameter 1696 mm
C 1–C 12	C II (Ostbahn)	1112–1123	12	1862–1863	C n2	
C 13–C 64	C III (Ostbahn)	1124–1175	55	1867–1875	C n2	C 37–C39 were sold as new in 1872 to the Imperial Railways in Alsace-Lorraine, on new models the same number was used
D 1–D 12	D IV (Ostbahn)	1178–1189	12	1867–1872	B n2t	
D 13–D 14	D II (Ostbahn)	1176–1177	2	1866	B n2t	Property of the Deggendorf-Plattling Railway operated by the Bavarian Ostbahn

Former Ostbahn locomotives were fitted with stronger tyres by the Royal Bavarian State Railways, so that in later years they had wheel diameters of up to 40 mm greater. Class C III (Ostbahn) und D IV (Ostbahn) locomotives were included in DRG's preliminary steam locomotive renumbering plan of 1923 under the numbers 53 7834–53 7868 and 88 7021–88 7026, but they did not appear in the final numbering plan.

== Literature ==
- Wolfgang Valtin: Deutsches Lok-Archiv: Verzeichnis aller Lokomotiven und Triebwagen Band 1 – Numerierungssysteme, transpress, Berlin 1992, ISBN 3-344-70739-6
- Wolfgang Valtin: Deutsches Lok-Archiv: Verzeichnis aller Lokomotiven und Triebwagen Band 2 – Dampflokomotiven und Dampftriebwagen, transpress, Berlin 1992, ISBN 3-344-70740-X
- Wolfgang Valtin: Deutsches Lok-Archiv: Verzeichnis aller Lokomotiven und Triebwagen Band 3 – Elektro- und Dieselloks, Triebwagen, transpress, Berlin 1992, ISBN 3-344-70741-8
- Heinz Schnabel: Deutsches Lok-Archiv: Lokomotiven bayerischer Eisenbahnen transpress, Berlin 1992 ISBN 3-344-70717-5

== See also ==
- History of rail transport in Germany
- Royal Bavarian State Railways
- UIC classification
