= Bavarian C II =

The Bavarian C II was a class of early German steam locomotives operated by the Royal Bavarian State Railways (Königlich Bayerische Staatsbahn).

== Articulated variant (Stütztender) ==
Bavarian C II Articulated variant (Stütztender)
Type and origin
- Builder: Maffei
- Build date: 1857–1858
- Total produced: 5
Specifications
- Configuration
  - Whyte: 0-6-4T, 0-6-6T
- Gauge: 1,435 mm (4 ft 8 1/2 in)
- Driver dia.: 1,253 mm (4 ft 1 3/8 in)
- Length
  - Over beams: 12,369 mm (40 ft 7 in)
- Axle load: 11.4 t (11.2 long tons; 12.6 short tons)
- Adhesive weight: 34.2 t (33.7 long tons; 37.7 short tons)
- Service weight: 50.0 t (49.2 long tons; 55.1 short tons)
- Boiler pressure: 8 kgf/cm^{2} (785 kPa; 114 lbf/in^{2})
- Heating surface
  - Firebox: 1.40 m^{2} (15.1 sq ft)
  - Evaporative: 113.10 m^{2} (1,217.4 sq ft)
- Cylinders: 2
- Cylinder size: 457 mm (18 in)
- Piston stroke: 660 mm (26 in)
Performance figures
- Maximum speed: 45 km/h (28 mph)
Career
- Numbers: 189 HERCULES to 199 THESEUS
- Retired: by 1906

The first C IIs were built experimentally as articulated locomotives. The concept was based on an idea that had been developed by Wilhelm von Engerth (cf. the Engerth locomotive), whereby the boiler barrel was supported by the tender - sometimes called a Stütztender or 'supported tender'. Because the engines did not ride smoothly however, they were converted in 1870. Initially the Stütztender was removed and, in order to balance out the uneven weight distribution on the axles, the first axle was uncoupled, so that the locomotives had a 1B axle arrangement. When, after a few years, the boiler had to be replaced, it was positioned further forward to enable a better distribution of weight. As a result, the former articulated locomotives were then the same as the standard C II locomotives and became six-coupled again. A total of five were built by Maffei, which were named HERCULES, HECTOR, ACHILLES, AJAX and THESEUS.

== Standard variant ==
Bavarian C II Standard variant
Type and origin
- Builder: Maffei, Krauss
- Build date: 1861–1868
- Total produced: 68
Specifications
- Configuration
  - Whyte: 0-6-0
- Gauge: 1,435 mm (4 ft 8 1/2 in)
- Driver dia.: 1,253 mm (4 ft 1 3/8 in)
- Length
  - Over beams: 13,500 mm (44 ft 3 1/2 in)
- Axle load: 12.5 t (12.3 long tons; 13.8 short tons)
- Adhesive weight: 34.3 t (33.8 long tons; 37.8 short tons)
- Service weight: 34.3 t (33.8 long tons; 37.8 short tons)
- Water cap.: 9.25 m^{3} (2,030 imp gal; 2,440 US gal)
- Boiler pressure: 8 or 10 kgf/cm^{2} (785 or 981 kPa; 114 or 142 lbf/in^{2})
- Heating surface
  - Firebox: 1.35 m^{2} (14.5 sq ft)
  - Evaporative: 113.10 m^{2} (1,217.4 sq ft)
- Cylinders: 2
- Cylinder size: 457 mm (18 in)
- Piston stroke: 660 mm (26 in)
Performance figures
- Maximum speed: 45 km/h (28 mph)
Career
- Numbers: 220 JASON to 368 SCHÄRDING
- Retired: by 1906

The C II locomotives were needed to handle the growth in goods traffic. The standard variant of the C II series was built as an 0-6-0 engine with a 4-wheeled tender. It was derived from the Bavarian C I class and was given an external locomotive frame, horizontal outside cylinders, an internal Stephenson valve gear and a 'long-necked crank' (Langhalskurbel). The transition from boiler barrel to outer firebox had been tapered so that it could fit between the rear axle. Instead of a driver's cab, these locos were given a weather shield (Wetterschirm), similar to those on present-day motorbikes. Their retirement began in 1891 and was complete by the end of the 1920s. Several examples went as wartime reparations to France and Belgium.

They were equipped with a Bavarian 2 T 9,25 tender.

== See also ==
- List of Bavarian locomotives and railbuses
