= Bavarian B V (articulated) =

Type and origin
- Builder: Maffei
- Build date: 1857
- Total produced: 1
Specifications
- Configuration
  - Whyte: 0-4-6T
  - UIC: B3′ n2
- Gauge: 1,435 mm (4 ft 8 1/2 in)
- Wheelbase
  - Overall: 8,534 mm (28 ft 0 in)
- Length
  - Over beams: 3,809 mm (12 ft 6 in)
- Adhesive weight: ca. 21 t (21 long tons; 23 short tons)
- Empty weight: ca. 18 t (18 long tons; 20 short tons)
- Total weight: ca. 45 t (44 long tons; 50 short tons)
- Fuel capacity: Wood, 5 m^{3} (180 cu ft)
- Water cap.: 5.66 m^{3} (1,250 imp gal; 1,500 US gal)
- Boiler pressure: 7 kgf/cm^{2} (686 kPa; 99.6 lbf/in^{2})
- Heating surface
  - Firebox: 1.25 m^{2} (13.5 sq ft)
  - Evaporative: ca. 90 m^{2} (970 sq ft)
- Cylinders: 2
- Cylinder size: 306 mm (12 1/16 in)
- Piston stroke: 610 mm (24 in)
Performance figures
- Maximum speed: 70 km/h (43 mph)
Career
- Numbers: PHÖNIX

The articulated variant of the Bavarian B V was an unusual, 0-4-6, steam locomotive in the Royal Bavarian State Railways (Königlich Bayerische Staats-Eisenbahnen).

The articulated B V was a four-coupled locomotive built by Maffei at their own expense. It was based on the Class B V but, instead of having a third coupled axle, the back of the engine was supported by the front of the tender, called in German a Stütztender or "supporting tender". This was similar to the earlier Engerth design which articulated the tender with the main locomotive frame, allowing some of the weight of the fuel and water to be carried on the driving wheels to improve adhesion. Because the tender was articulated, rather than directly attached to the frame, the locomotive could traverse relatively sharp curves, while still enjoying the advantage of the additional adhesive weight gain. The articulated B V was not a success; its riding qualities were poor and only one example was produced.

== See also ==
- Royal Bavarian State Railways
- List of Bavarian locomotives and railbuses

== Sources ==
- v. Welser, Ludwig (1994). Bayern-Report, Band Nr. 4, Eisenbahn Journal Archiv. Fürstenfeldbruck: Merker. ISBN 3-922404-69-3.
