= Bavarian AA I =

Steam locomotive built in 1896

Bavarian AA I later P 2/4 DRG Class 36.8
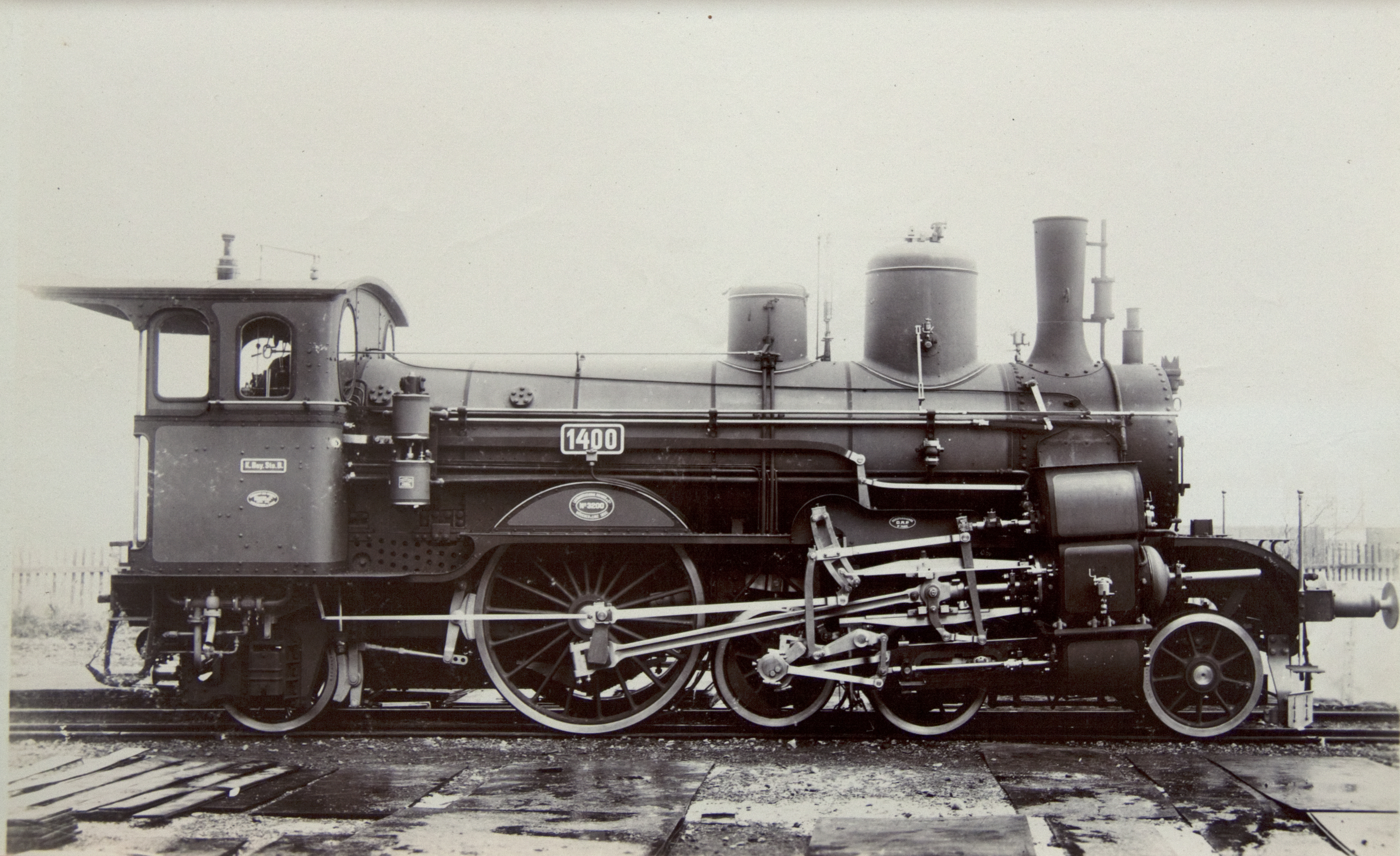
Type and origin
- Builder: Krauss
- Build date: 1896
- Total produced: 1
Specifications
- Configuration
  - Whyte: 4-2-2-2, later 4-4-0
- Gauge: 1,435 mm (4 ft 8 1/2 in)
- Leading dia.: 1,006 mm (3 ft 3 5/8 in)
- Driver dia.: 1,870 mm (6 ft 1 5/8 in)
- Length
  - Over beams: 16,570 mm (54 ft 4 1/4 in)
- Axle load: 14.9 t (14.7 long tons; 16.4 short tons)
- Adhesive weight: 29.8 t (29.3 long tons; 32.8 short tons)
- Service weight: 51.7 t (50.9 long tons; 57.0 short tons)
- Water cap.: 14.5 m^{3} (3,200 imp gal; 3,800 US gal)
- Boiler pressure: 13 kgf/cm^{2} (1.27 MPa; 185 lbf/in^{2})
- Heating surface
  - Firebox: 2.26 m^{2} (24.3 sq ft)
  - Evaporative: 94.60 m^{2} (1,018.3 sq ft)
- Superheater
  - Heating area: 26.85 m^{2} (289.0 sq ft)
- Cylinders: 2
- Cylinder size: 490 mm (19 5/16 in)
- Piston stroke: 610 mm (24 in)
Performance figures
- Maximum speed: 90 km/h (56 mph)
Career
- Numbers: K.Bay.Sts.E.: 1400; DRG: 36 861
- Retired: 1933

The only AA I steam locomotive of the Royal Bavarian State Railways (Königlich Bayerische Staatsbahn) was built by the firm of Krauss in 1896. It had been designed by chief mechanical engineer, Richard von Helmholtz, as a 4-2-2-2 tender locomotive. The engine was largely based on the Bavarian B XI, but the driving and running gear was modified. The second coupled axle was replaced by a fixed carrying axle, and a dolly axle (Vorspannachse) added between the bogie and driving axle. This could be lowered by a pressure cylinder and was driven by an auxiliary engine with two cylinders. The engine was equipped with a Bavarian 3 T 14.5 tender.

Despite high maintenance requirements it was economical to run due to low steam consumption. After an accident in 1907 it was rebuilt into a 2'B h2 locomotive and redesignated Class P 2/4. It was taken over by the Deutsche Reichsbahn and renumbered 36 861. It was the last Bavarian 4-4-0 locomotive to be retired in 1933.

== See also ==
- Royal Bavarian State Railways
- List of Bavarian locomotives and railbuses
