= Bavarian B III =

Type and origin
- Builder: Hartmann (10); Maffei (8)
- Build date: 1852–1855
- Total produced: 18
Specifications
- Configuration
  - Whyte: 2-4-0
- Gauge: 1,435 mm (4 ft 8 1/2 in)
- Leading dia.: 915 mm (3 ft 0 in)
- Driver dia.: 1,448–1,470 mm (4 ft 9 in – 4 ft 9 7/8 in)
- Length
  - Over beams: 13,905–14,045 mm (45 ft 7 1/2 in – 46 ft 1 in)
- Axle load: 10.4–11.6 t (10.2–11.4 long tons; 11.5–12.8 short tons)
- Adhesive weight: 20.9–23.3 t (20.6–22.9 long tons; 23.0–25.7 short tons)
- Service weight: 30.1–33.2 t (29.6–32.7 long tons; 33.2–36.6 short tons)
- Water cap.: 5.0 m^{3} (1,100 imp gal; 1,300 US gal)
- Boiler: Crampton
- Boiler pressure: 7 kgf/cm^{2} (686 kPa; 99.6 lbf/in^{2}) or; 8 kgf/cm^{2} (785 kPa; 114 lbf/in^{2}) or; 10 kgf/cm^{2} (981 kPa; 142 lbf/in^{2})
- Heating surface
  - Firebox: 1.24 m^{2} (13.3 sq ft)
  - Evaporative: 101.10 m^{2} (1,088.2 sq ft)
- Cylinders: 2
- Cylinder size: 406 mm (16 in)
- Piston stroke: 610 mm (24 in)
Performance figures
- Maximum speed: 70 km/h (43 mph)
Career
- Retired: 1897

Bavarian B IIIs were steam locomotives of the Royal Bavarian State Railways (Königlich Bayerische Staatsbahn).

Eight examples were delivered by Maffei in 1852; the remainder came from Hartmann. The machines by Hartmann had great similarity to those of the Class A IV, which were manufactured at the same time. Unlike the Hartmann engines, these locomotives also had a steam dome. This was later added to the Hartmann variants. All the engines had a Crampton boiler with smooth tubes and a Kirchweger condenser.

They were equipped with a 3 T 5 tender.

== See also ==
- Royal Bavarian State Railways
- List of Bavarian locomotives and railbuses
