= Bavarian B II =

Type and origin
- Builder: Maffei
- Build date: 1851–1852
- Total produced: 14
Specifications
- Configuration
  - Whyte: 2-4-0
- Gauge: 1,435 mm (4 ft 8 1/2 in)
- Leading dia.: 915 mm (3 ft 0 in)
- Driver dia.: 1,372 mm
- Length
  - Over beams: 13,730 mm (45 ft 1/2 in)
- Axle load: 10.6 t (10.4 long tons; 11.7 short tons)
- Adhesive weight: 21.3 t (21.0 long tons; 23.5 short tons)
- Service weight: 28.7 t (28.2 long tons; 31.6 short tons)
- Water cap.: 5.0 m^{3} (1,100 imp gal; 1,300 US gal)
- Boiler pressure: 7 kgf/cm^{2} (686 kPa; 99.6 lbf/in^{2})
- Heating surface
  - Firebox: 1.00 m^{2} (10.8 sq ft)
  - Evaporative: 79.90 m^{2} (860.0 sq ft)
- Cylinders: 2
- Cylinder size: 381 mm (1 ft 3 in)
- Piston stroke: 610 mm (24 in)
Performance figures
- Maximum speed: 65 km/h (40 mph)
Career
- Retired: 1879

Bavarian B IIs were steam locomotives with the Royal Bavarian State Railways (Königlich Bayerische Staatsbahn).

They was delivered at the same time as the A III and had all the same construction features. They were equipped with 3 T 5 tenders.

The following locomotives were supplied by Maffei, the manufacturer:

Inventory Number	Name	Manufacturer	Build Number	Year Built	Date Entered Service	Date Retired
68	BUCHLOE	Maffei	75	1851	Sep. 1851	Dec. 1878
69	SCHWABMÜNCHEN	Maffei	76	1851	Sep. 1851	1879
70	KEMPTEN	Maffei	77	1851	Sep. 1851	1876
71	IMMENSTADT	Maffei	78	1851	Sep. 1851	1879
72	STAUFFEN	Maffei	79	1851	Nov. 1851	1878
73	ALLGÄU	Maffei	80	1851	13 Dec. 1851	Dec. 1878
74	ILLER	Maffei	81	1851	24 Dec. 1851	1879
76	GRÜNTEN	Maffei	82	1851	23 Feb. 1852	1879
78	MÜNCHEN	Maffei	91	1851	12 May 1852	1879
79	NYMPHENBURG	Maffei	92	1851	18 May 1852	1876
80	ISAR	Maffei	93	1851	27 May 1852	1878
81	AMPER	Maffei	94	1851	May 1852	1879
82	LECHFELD	Maffei	95	1851	June 1852	1879
83	BERG	Maffei	96	1851	18 June 1852	Dec. 1878

== See also ==
- List of Bavarian locomotives and railbuses
