= Bavarian C III (Ostbahn) =

Bavarian C III DRG Class 53.78
Type and origin
- Builder: Maffei
- Build date: 1867–1875
- Total produced: 55
Specifications
- Configuration
  - Whyte: 0-6-0
- Gauge: 1,435 mm (4 ft 8 1/2 in)
- Driver dia.: 1,220/1,255/1,274 mm
- Length
  - Over beams: 14,115 mm (46 ft 3 3/4 in)
- Adhesive weight: 24.0/27.5 m^{2}
- Service weight: 24.0/27.5 m^{2}
- Water cap.: 9.0 or 9.5 m^{3} (2,000 or 2,100 imp gal; 2,400 or 2,500 US gal)
- Boiler pressure: 8–10 kgf/cm^{2} (785–981 kPa; 114–142 lbf/in^{2})
- Heating surface
  - Firebox: 1.05 or 1.10 m^{2} (11.3 or 11.8 sq ft)
  - Evaporative: 72.50 or 66.50 m^{2} (780.4 or 715.8 sq ft)
- Cylinders: 2
- Cylinder size: 349 or 356 mm (13 3/4 or 14 in)
- Piston stroke: 508 mm (20 in)
- Valve gear: Allan
Performance figures
- Maximum speed: 45 km/h (28 mph)
Career
- Numbers: BOB: C13 to C64; K.Bay.Sts.E: 1124–1189; DRG: 53 7835 – 53 7864
- Retired: up to 1925

The Bavarian Class C, later C III, waw a German steam locomotive with the Bavarian Eastern Railway (Bayrischen Ostbahn) and Deutsche Reichsbahn.

From 1867 a total of 152 examples of this engine were built in Bavaria for the Ostbahn. The five series differed in their dimensions from one another. They had larger grate and heating areas than their predecessor engines, the Class C II. In addition the drive was to the middle axle, so that shorter connecting rods could be used. The locomotives had an Allan valve gear and injectors.

Retirement began after 1905. In 1920, 49 machines were still left. The Reichsbahn recorded 35 of the 38 remaining engines in 1923 and gave them the numbers 53 7835 to 53 7864. However, by 1925 they were no longer on active duty. Three engines went as reparations to the Belgian State Railways.

The locomotives were equipped with 3 T 9 and 3 T 9.5 tenders.

== See also ==
- Royal Bavarian State Railways
- List of Bavarian locomotives and railbuses
