= Bavarian B VIII =

Type and origin
- Builder: Maffei
- Build date: 1872
- Total produced: 6
Specifications
- Configuration
  - Whyte: 2-4-0
- Gauge: 1,435 mm (4 ft 8 1/2 in)
- Leading dia.: 1,115 mm (3 ft 7 7/8 in)
- Driver dia.: 1,620 mm (5 ft 3 3/4 in)
- Length
  - Over beams: 13,750 mm (45 ft 1 1/4 in)
- Axle load: 12.0 t (11.8 long tons; 13.2 short tons)
- Adhesive weight: 21.2 t (20.9 long tons; 23.4 short tons)
- Service weight: 33.2 t (32.7 long tons; 36.6 short tons)
- Water cap.: 9.0 m^{3} (2,000 imp gal; 2,400 US gal)
- Boiler pressure: 10 kgf/cm^{2} (980 kPa; 140 lbf/in^{2})
- Heating surface
  - Firebox: 1.52 m^{2} (16.4 sq ft)
  - Evaporative: 95.10 m^{2} (1,023.6 sq ft)
- Cylinders: 2
- Cylinder size: 406 mm (16 in)
- Piston stroke: 610 mm (24 in)
- Valve gear: Stephenson
Performance figures
- Maximum speed: 80 km/h (50 mph)
Career
- Numbers: 497 SCHILLER to 502 WIELAND
- Retired: by 1911

The B VIII steam engines of the Royal Bavarian State Railways (Königlich Bayerische Staatsbahn) were 2-4-0 tender locomotives.

This class was a forerunner of the first Bavarian express train locomotive. It was equipped with an inside Stephenson valve gear, inside steam chests, detachable cranks, (Aufsteckkurbel) and a full outside frame (aussenliegender Füllrahmen). The firebox was supported in order to provide a better distribution of weight.

They were equipped with Bavarian 3 T 9 tenders.

== See also ==
- Royal Bavarian State Railways
- List of Bavarian locomotives and railbuses
