= Bavarian MCCi =

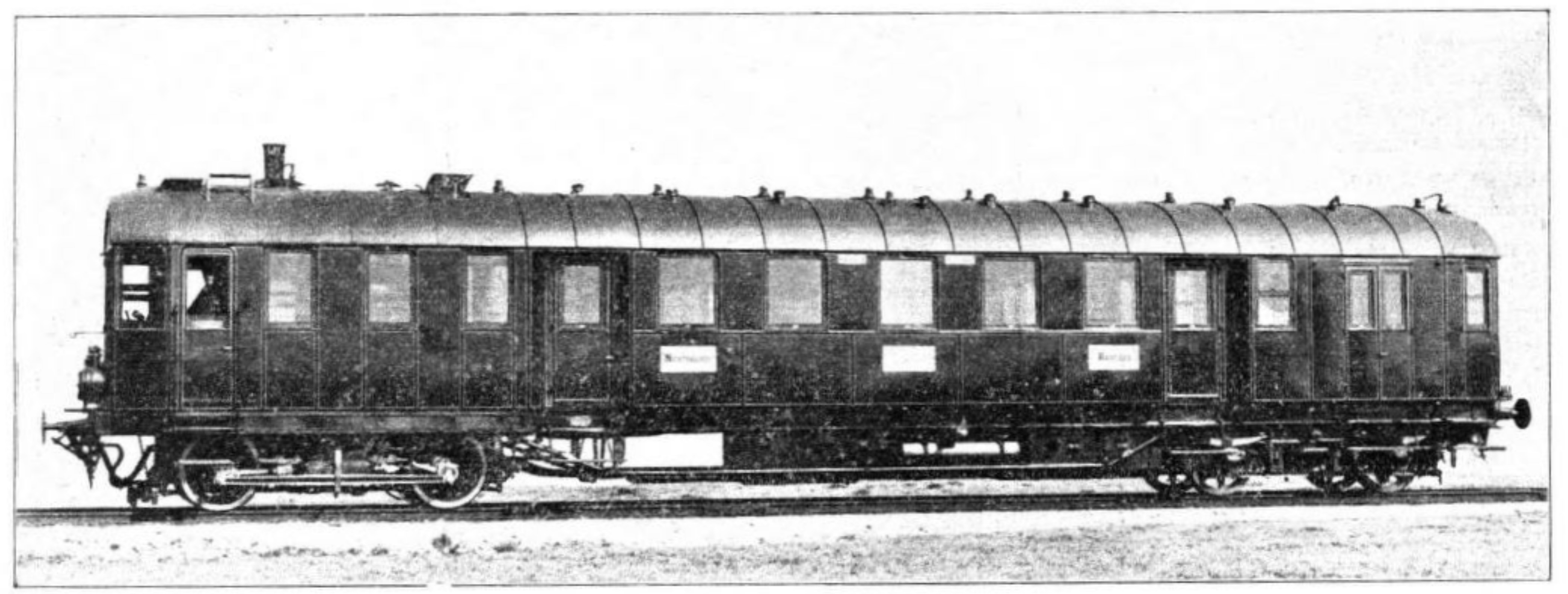
Type and origin
- Power type: Steam
- Builder: Maffei, MAN
- Build date: 1906–1908
- Total produced: 7
Specifications
- Configuration
  - Whyte: 0-4-0+4
  - UIC: B'2'
- Gauge: 1,435 mm (4 ft 8 1/2 in)
- Driver dia.: 990 mm (3 ft 3 in)
- Carrying wheel diameter: 990 mm (3 ft 3 in)
- Length
  - Over beams: 19,941 mm (65 ft 5.1 in)
- Boiler pressure: 12 bar
- Heating surface
  - Firebox: 0.83 m^{2} (8.9 sq ft)
  - Evaporative: 35.50–42.00 m^{2} (382.1–452.1 sq ft)
- Cylinders: 2
- Cylinder size: 265 mm (10.4 in)
- Piston stroke: 280 mm (11 in)
Performance figures
- Maximum speed: 50 km/h (31 mph)
- Indicated power: 145 kW (194 hp)
Career
- Numbers: 14501–14507
- Retired: 1920s (rebuilt)

The steam railbuses of Bavarian Class MCCi were built between 1906–1908 for the Royal Bavarian State Railways (Königlich Bayerische Staatsbahn) for suburban services in the Munich area. Seven units were produced, the coach bodies being manufactured by MAN and the engines by Maffei.

The railbuses had a B'2' axle arrangement, thus two of the four axles were driven. The engine was technically very similar to that of the four-wheeled Lokalbahn (branch line) locomotives of Bavarian Class ML 2/2.

In the mid-1920s as the vehicles were taken over by the Deutsche Reichsbahn, four of the railbuses were converted to electric propulsion and initially classified as the D4i elT and later as ET 85. They were therefore prototypes for the DRG's Class ET 85s.

Another MCCi was converted to a diesel railbus in 1928 by MAN (VT 865); this did not prove effective however and was retired by the end of the 1920s.

== See also ==
- Royal Bavarian State Railways
- List of Bavarian locomotives and railbuses
