= Bavarian C IV =

C IV Zwilling (two-cylinder simple) DRG Class 53.80
Type and origin
- Builder: Maffei; Krauss
- Build date: 1884–1892
- Total produced: 87
Specifications
- Configuration
  - Whyte: 0-6-0
- Gauge: 1,435 mm (4 ft 8 1/2 in)
- Driver dia.: 1,340 mm (4 ft 4 3/4 in)
- Wheelbase
  - incl. tender: 10,300 mm (33 ft 9 1/2 in)
- Length
  - Over beams: 14,600 mm (47 ft 10 3/4 in)
- Axle load: 13.3 t (13.1 long tons; 14.7 short tons)
- Adhesive weight: 40.0 t (39.4 long tons; 44.1 short tons)
- Service weight: 40.0 t (39.4 long tons; 44.1 short tons)
- Tender weight: 27.2 t (26.8 long tons; 30.0 short tons)
- Tender type: 3 T 10.2
- Fuel capacity: 5,000 kg (11,000 lb) coal
- Water cap.: 10.2 m^{3} (2,200 imp gal; 2,700 US gal)
- Boiler pressure: 11 kgf/cm^{2} (1,080 kPa; 156 lbf/in^{2})
- Heating surface
  - Firebox: 1.67 m^{2} (18.0 sq ft)
  - Evaporative: 111.80 m^{2} (1,203.4 sq ft)
- Cylinders: 2, simple
- Cylinder size: 486 mm (19 1/8 in)
- Piston stroke: 630 mm (24 13/16 in)
- Valve gear: Allan, inside
Performance figures
- Maximum speed: 50 km/h (31 mph)
Career
- Numbers: K.Bay.Sts.E.: 1401–1441, 1452–1462 (named); DRG: 53 8011 – 53 8064
- Retired: by 1926

C IV Verbund (two-cylinder compound) DRG Class 53.80–81
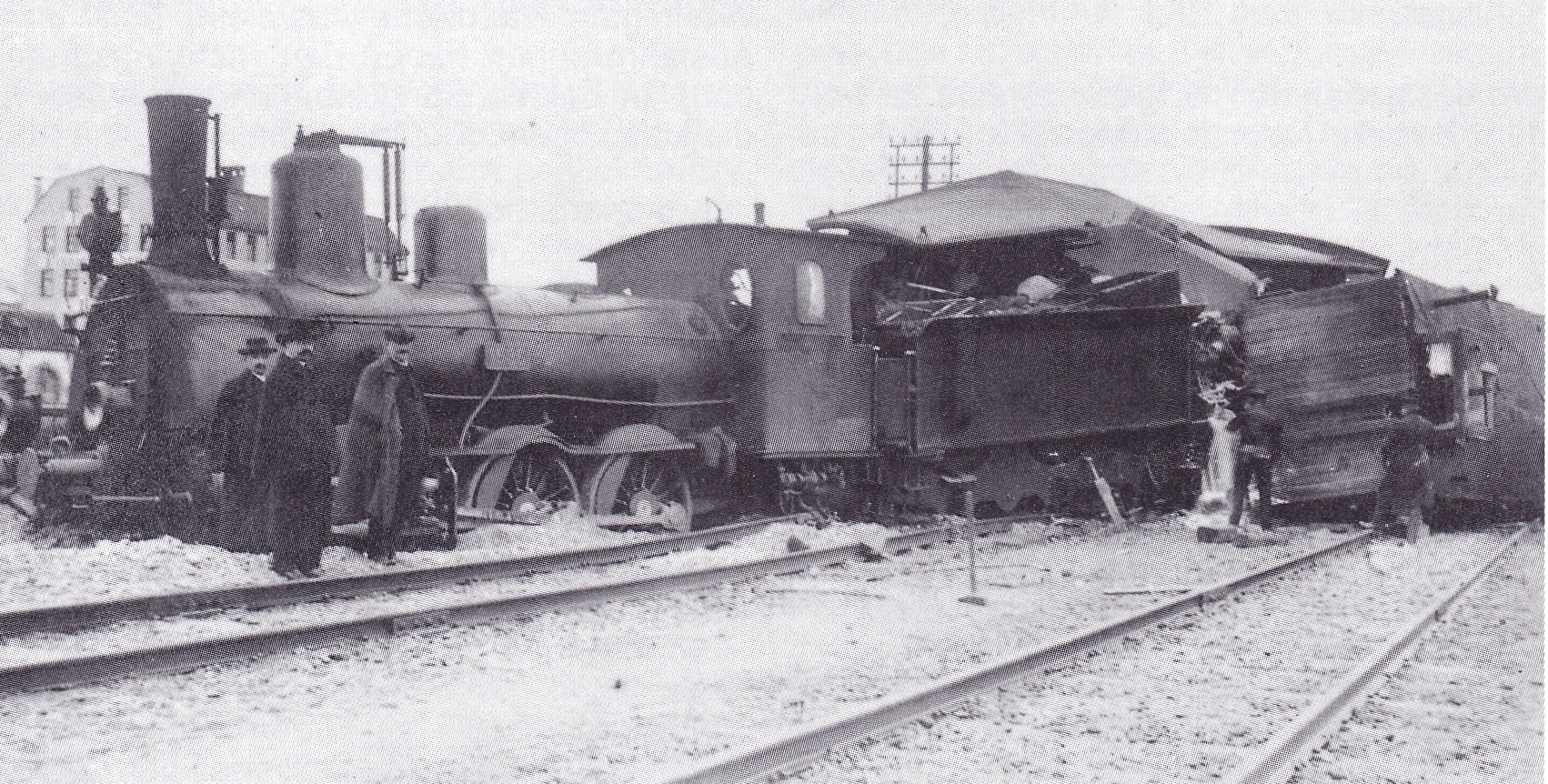
- Bavarian C IV no. 1536 after a derailment in Munich Laim station in 1908
Type and origin
- Builder: Krauss; Maffei
- Build date: 1889–1897
- Total produced: 100
Specifications
- Configuration
  - Whyte: 0-6-0
- Gauge: 1,435 mm (4 ft 8 1/2 in)
- Driver dia.: 1,340 mm (4 ft 4 3/4 in)
- Wheelbase
  - incl. tender: 10,500 mm (34 ft 5 1/2 in) ^{1}; 10,530 mm (34 ft 6 1/2 in) ^{2}
- Length
  - Over beams: 14,990 mm (49 ft 2 1/4 in) ^{1}; 15,020 mm (49 ft 3 1/4 in) ^{2}
- Axle load: 13.4 t (13.2 long tons; 14.8 short tons) ^{1}; 14.0 t (13.8 long tons; 15.4 short tons) ^{2}
- Adhesive weight: 40.3 t (39.7 long tons; 44.4 short tons) ^{1}; 42.0 t (41.3 long tons; 46.3 short tons) ^{2}
- Service weight: 40.3 t (39.7 long tons; 44.4 short tons) ^{1}; 42.0 t (41.3 long tons; 46.3 short tons) ^{2}
- Tender weight: 27.5 t (27.1 long tons; 30.3 short tons)
- Tender type: 3 T 10.5
- Fuel capacity: 5,000 kg (11,000 lb) coal
- Water cap.: 10.5 m^{3} (2,300 imp gal; 2,800 US gal)
- Boiler pressure: 12 kgf/cm^{2} (1,180 kPa; 171 lbf/in^{2}) ^{1}; 13 kgf/cm^{2} (1,270 kPa; 185 lbf/in^{2}) ^{2}
- Heating surface
  - Firebox: 1.67 m^{2} (18.0 sq ft)
  - Evaporative: 111.80 m^{2} (1,203.4 sq ft)
- Cylinders: 2, compound
- High-pressure cylinder: 486 mm (19 1/8 in) ^{1}; 500 mm (19 11/16 in) ^{2}
- Low-pressure cylinder: 705 mm (27 3/4 in)
- Piston stroke: 630 mm (24 13/16 in)
- Valve gear: Allan, inside
Performance figures
- Maximum speed: 50 km/h (31 mph)
Career
- Numbers: K.Bay.Sts.E.: 1442–1451, 1463–1550 (named); DRG: 53 8081 – 53 8168
- Retired: by 1931
- ^{1} trials engines; ^{2} production engines from no. 1442

The C IV was a steam locomotive, built for goods train duties, that was manufactured between 1884 and 1897 for the Royal Bavarian State Railways (Königlich Bayerische Staatsbahn).

== Description ==
Between 1884 and 1893 a total of 87 units two-cylinder, saturated steam engines were delivered. They were followed by two compound engines in 1889 for testing and then 98 more compounds from 1892 to 1897. The locomotives, which for the first time did not have the external frames typical in Bavaria up to that time, were soon no longer equal to the growing demands made on them. In spite of that, many were taken over by the Deutsche Reichsbahn, designated as Class 53.80-81 and allocated the operating numbers 53 8011 to 8064 and 53 8081 to 8168. The two-cylinder engines were equipped with a Bavarian Class 3 T 10.2 tender; they were all retired by 1926. The compound variants had a Class 3 T 10.5 tender; they were taken out of service by 1931.

== See also ==
- Royal Bavarian State Railways
- List of Bavarian locomotives and railbuses
