= Bavarian B IV =

Type and origin
- Builder: Hartmann (4); Kessler (6)
- Build date: 1852–1853
- Total produced: 10
Specifications
- Configuration
  - Whyte: 2-4-0
- Gauge: 1,435 mm (4 ft 8 1/2 in)
- Leading dia.: 915 mm (3 ft 0 in)
- Driver dia.: 1,524 mm (5 ft 0 in)
- Length
  - Over beams: 13,639 mm (44 ft 9 in)
- Axle load: 10.3 t (10.1 long tons; 11.4 short tons)
- Adhesive weight: 20.5 t (20.2 long tons; 22.6 short tons)
- Service weight: 28.0 t (27.6 long tons; 30.9 short tons)
- Water cap.: 5.0 m^{3} (1,100 imp gal; 1,300 US gal)
- Boiler pressure: 7 kgf/cm^{2} (686 kPa; 99.6 lbf/in^{2})
- Heating surface
  - Firebox: 1.30 m^{2} (14.0 sq ft)
  - Evaporative: 98.8–101.2 m^{2} (1,063–1,089 sq ft)
- Cylinders: 2
- Cylinder size: 406 mm (16 in)
- Piston stroke: 610 mm (24 in)
Performance figures
- Maximum speed: 70 km/h (43 mph)
Career
- Retired: 1881

Bavarian B IVs were early German steam locomotives with the Royal Bavarian State Railways (Königlich Bayerische Staatsbahn).

The six engines built by Kessler were trialled with a Kessler boiler. This had a pear-shaped cross section and could therefore be set lower down between the wheels. The same effect was also attempted on the machines from Hartmann by using two boilers: a lower boiler with a small diameter and a larger, upper boiler. After two boiler explosions occurred, all the engines were equipped with normal boilers. All the vehicles had a steam dome in the centre, and the overhanging outer firebox had a flat top on which there was a safety valve and a pump (Fahrpumpe) driven by the crossheads.

They had Bavarian 3 T 5 tenders.

== See also ==
- List of Bavarian locomotives and railbuses
