= Bavarian C VI =

Class of 83+37 German 2-6-0 locomotives

Bavarian C VI and G 3/4 N DRG Classes 54.13 and 54.14
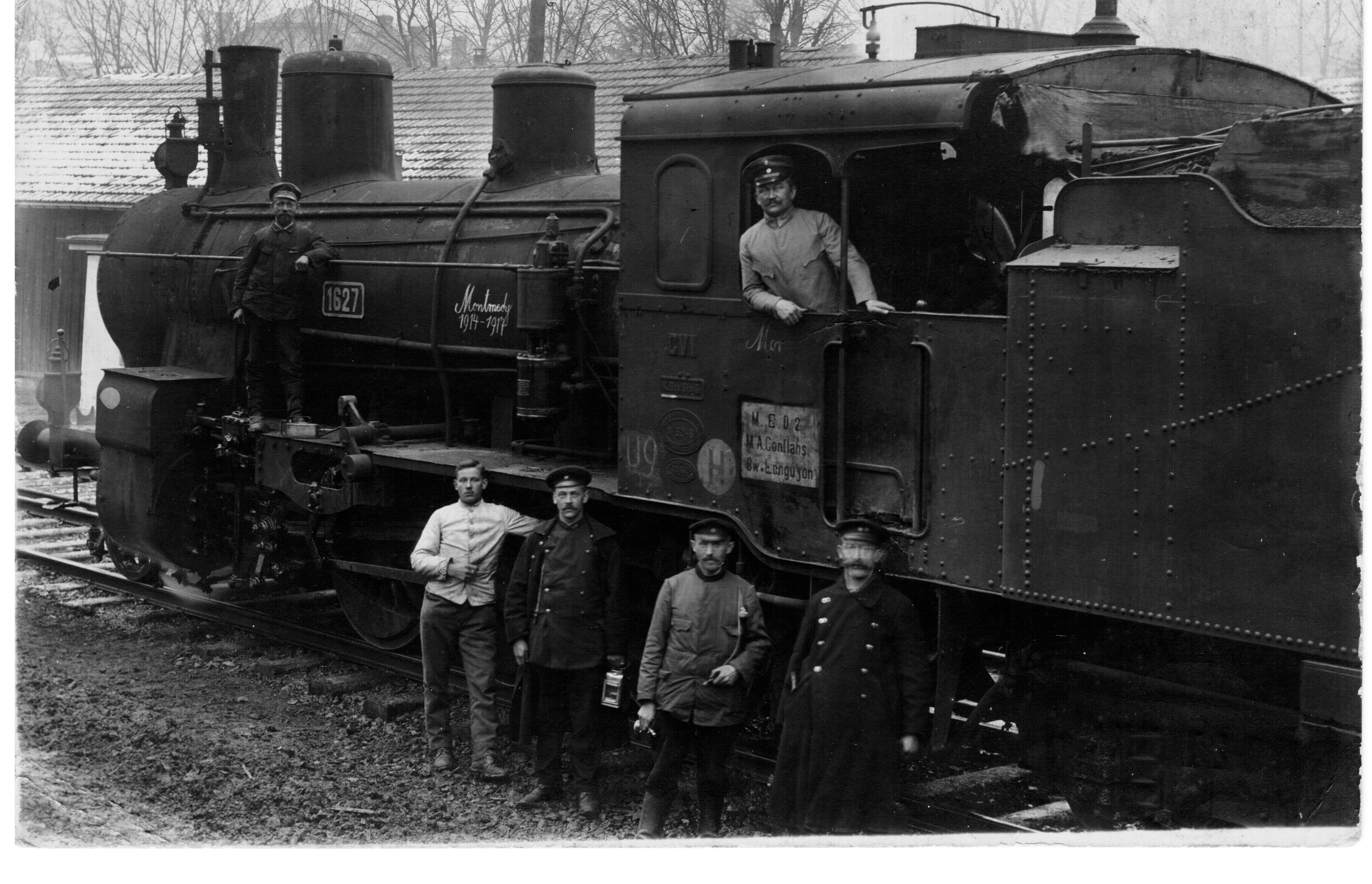
- Bavarian C VI No. 1627, in Montmedy, France, 10 January 1917
Type and origin
- Builder: C VI: Krauss, Maffei; G 3/4 N: Krauss
- Build date: C VI: 1899–1905; G 3/4 N: 1907–1909
- Total produced: C VI: 83; G 3/4 N: 37
Specifications
- Configuration
  - Whyte: 2-6-0
- Gauge: 1,435 mm (4 ft 8 1/2 in)
- Leading dia.: 1,006 mm (3 ft 3 5/8 in)
- Driver dia.: 1,340 mm (4 ft 4 3/4 in)
- Wheelbase
  - incl. tender: 14,570 mm (47 ft 9 1/2 in)
- Length
  - Over beams: C VI: 17,435 mm (57 ft 2 1/2 in); G 3/4 N: 17,457 mm (57 ft 3 1/4 in)
- Axle load: C VI: 14.2 t (14.0 long tons; 15.7 short tons); G 3/4 N: 14.4 t (14.2 long tons; 15.9 short tons)
- Adhesive weight: C VI: 42.6 t (41.9 long tons; 47.0 short tons); G 3/4 N: 43.2 t (42.5 long tons; 47.6 short tons)
- Service weight: C VI: 55.2 t (54.3 long tons; 60.8 short tons); G 3/4 N: 55.8 t (54.9 long tons; 61.5 short tons)
- Tender weight: 45.3 t (44.6 long tons; 49.9 short tons)
- Tender type: bay. 2′2′ T 18
- Fuel capacity: 6,500 kg (14,300 lb) coal
- Water cap.: 18 m^{3} (4,000 imp gal; 4,800 US gal)
- Boiler pressure: 13 kgf/cm^{2} (1.27 MPa; 185 lbf/in^{2})
- Heating surface
  - Firebox: 2.25 m^{2} (24.2 sq ft)
  - Evaporative: 133.2 m^{2} (1,434 sq ft)
- Cylinders: 2 (compound)
- High-pressure cylinder: 500 mm (19 11/16 in)
- Low-pressure cylinder: 740 mm (29 1/8 in)
- Piston stroke: 630 mm (24 13/16 in)
- Valve gear: Walschaerts (Heusinger), outside
Performance figures
- Maximum speed: 60 km/h (37 mph)
Career
- Numbers: C VI: K.Bay.Sts.E.: 1551–1633; DRG: 54 1301 – 54 1364; PKP: Ti101-1 – Ti101-7; État-Belge: 7379…7391; ČSD: 334.601; G 3/4 N: K.Bay.Sts.E.: 1634–1670; DRG: 54 1401 – 54 1432; PKP Ti101-8 and Ti101-9; État Belge: 7372…7393; ČSD: 334.602
- Retired: C VI: by 1935; G 3/4 N: by 1934

The goods train locomotives of Class C VI were German steam engines built between 1899 and 1905 for the Royal Bavarian State Railways (Königlich Bayerische Staatsbahn). It had great similarity to the Prussian G 5.4, but had a higher boiler overpressure and better riding qualities. In all the Bavarian state railways procured 83 engines of this type over that period. More machines with slight modifications were acquired between 1907 and 1909. These 37 engines were given the designation G 3/4 N. The Deutsche Reichsbahn inherited 64 Class C VI and 32 Class G 3/4 N engines. These were given operating numbers 54 1301–1364 and 54 1401–1432. The Class C VII locomotives remained in service until 1931, their Class G 3/4 N sister locomotives until 1935.

Both variants were equipped with a Bavarian 2'2' T 18 tender.

== See also ==
- Royal Bavarian State Railways
- List of Bavarian locomotives and railbuses
