= Bavarian A V =

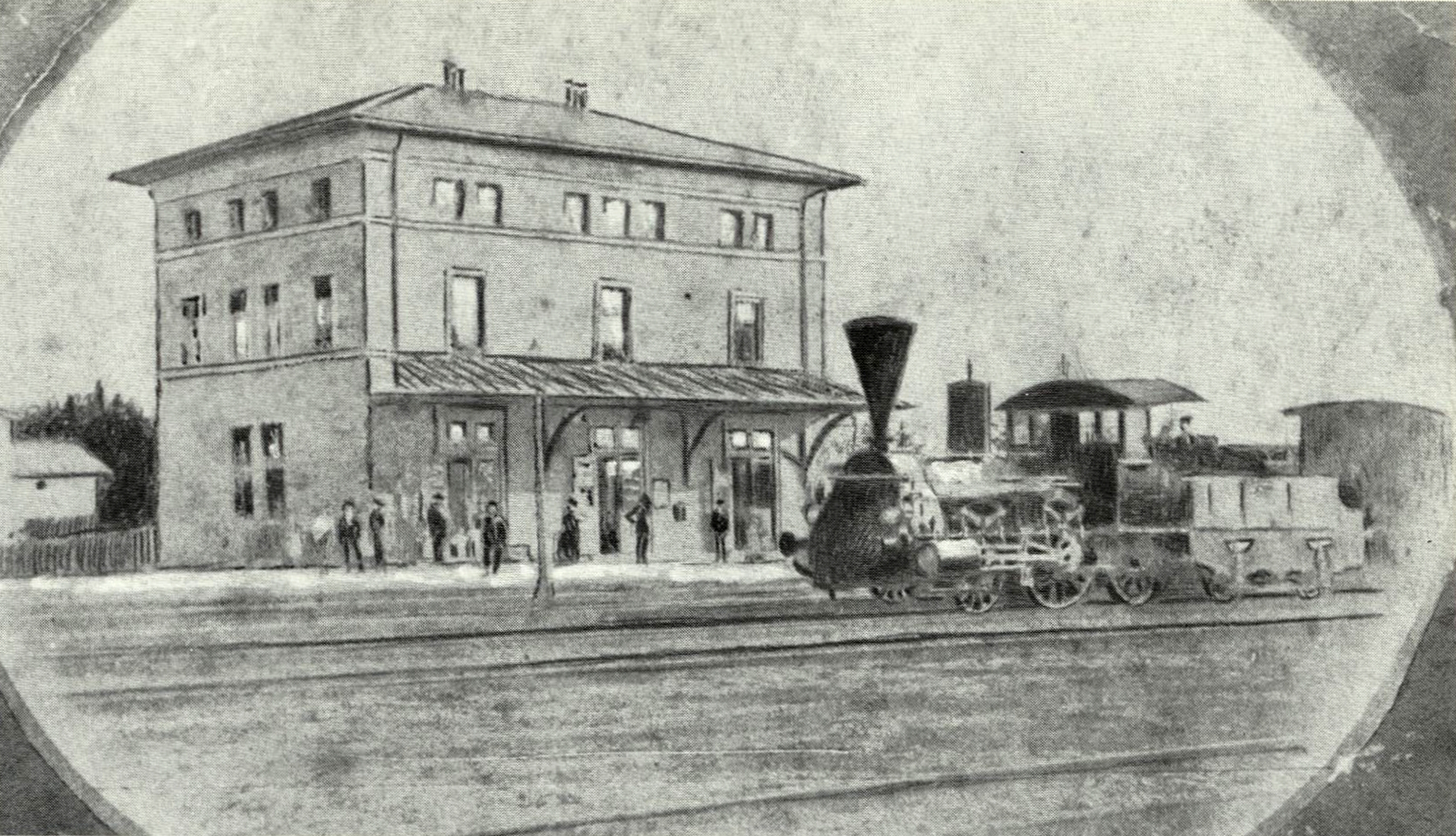
- Bavarian A V at Schwaben station
Type and origin
- Builder: Maffei
- Build date: 1853–1854
- Total produced: 24
Specifications
- Configuration
  - Whyte: 2-2-2
- Gauge: 1,435 mm (4 ft 8 1/2 in)
- Leading dia.: 1,118 or 1,220 mm (3 ft 8 in or 4 ft 0 in)
- Driver dia.: 1,676 or 1,830 mm (5 ft 6 in or 6 ft 0 in)
- Trailing dia.: 1,118 or 1,220 mm (3 ft 8 in or 4 ft 0 in)
- Length
  - Over beams: 11,830 or 12,140 mm (38 ft 9 3/4 in or 39 ft 10 in)
- Axle load: 9.0 or 10.5 t (8.9 or 10.3 long tons; 9.9 or 11.6 short tons)
- Adhesive weight: 9.0 or 10.5 t (8.9 or 10.3 long tons; 9.9 or 11.6 short tons)
- Service weight: 22.0 or 26.0 t (21.7 or 25.6 long tons; 24.3 or 28.7 short tons)
- Water cap.: 4.8 m^{3} (1,100 imp gal; 1,300 US gal)
- Boiler pressure: 7 kgf/cm^{2} (686 kPa; 99.6 lbf/in^{2})
- Heating surface
  - Firebox: 1.07 or 1.10 m^{2} (11.5 or 11.8 sq ft)
  - Evaporative: 63.70 or 78.00 m^{2} (685.7 or 839.6 sq ft)
- Cylinders: 2
- Cylinder size: 381 mm (15 in)
- Piston stroke: 559 mm (22 in)
Performance figures
- Maximum speed: 80 km/h (50 mph)
Career
- Numbers: Names and inventory nos.
- Retired: by 1902

Bavarian A V engines were 2-2-2 steam locomotives in service with the Royal Bavarian State Railways (Königlich Bayerische Staatsbahn). They were the last of the single-coupled locomotives built in Bavaria.

This class was the first express train locomotive with the Bavarian state railways. It was developed from the Class A IV. Unlike the A IV, the Class A V had a lower-pitched boiler and a wider firebox. In addition access to the valve gear was improved. Later still the vehicles were fitted with a steam dome. Because engines on the southern side of the Danube were fired with peat, they had a pear-shaped chimney. In addition these locomotives had different dimensions.

They were equipped with a 3 T 4.8 tender.

== See also ==
- List of Bavarian locomotives and railbuses

== Literature ==
- Günther Scheingraber: Die Königlich Bayerischen Staatsbahnen. Ihre Lokomotiven und Wagen in Wort und Bild. Franckh'sche Verlagshandlung Stuttgart 1975. ISBN 3-440-04233-2, pages 8 and 51.
