= Bavarian B X =

Bavarian B X DRG Class 34.75
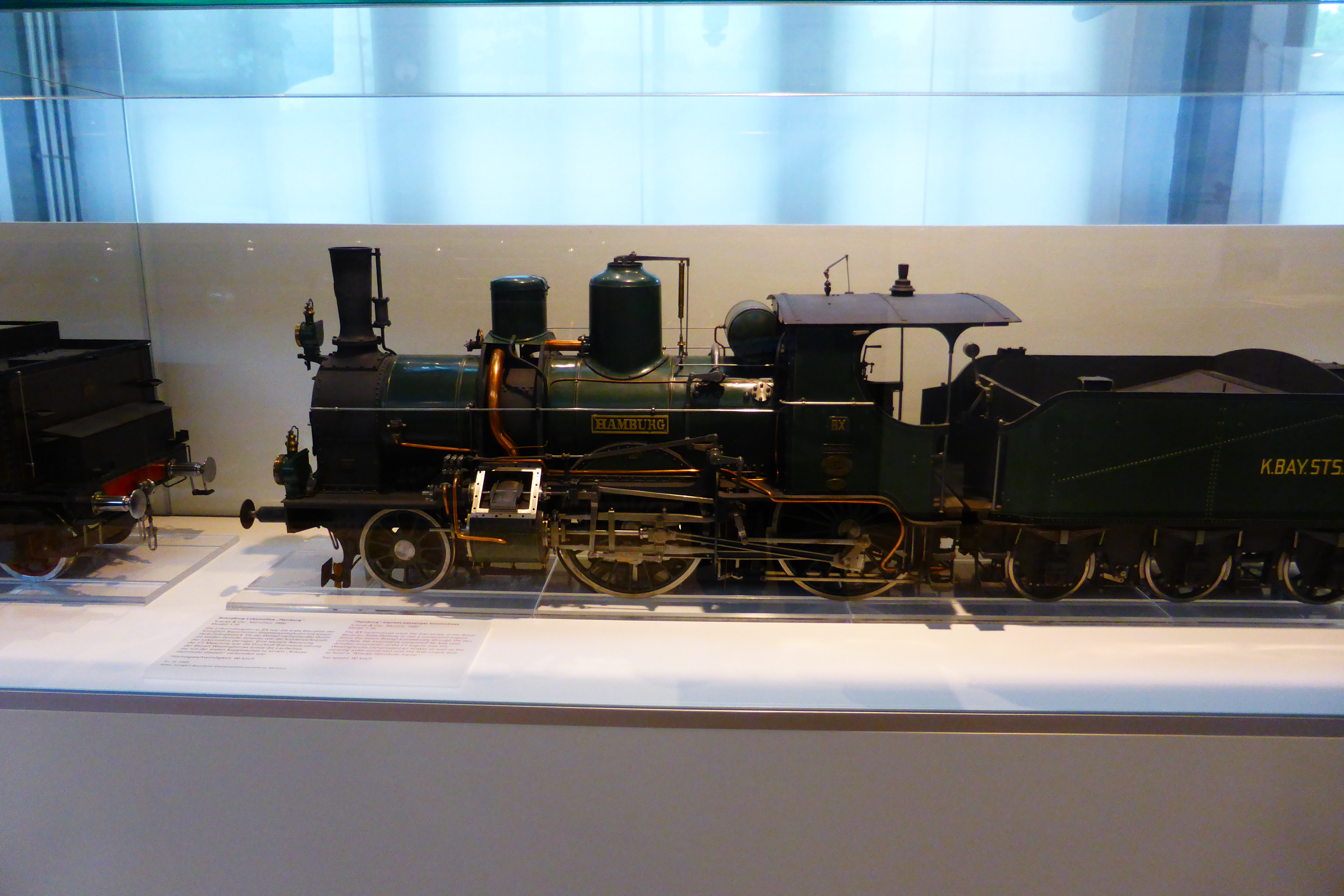
- Model of B X 941 "HAMBURG"
Type and origin
- Builder: Krauss
- Build date: 1889–1891
- Total produced: 14
Specifications
- Configuration
  - Whyte: 2-4-0
- Gauge: 1,435 mm (4 ft 8 1/2 in)
- Leading dia.: 1,170 mm (3 ft 10 1/8 in)
- Driver dia.: 1,870 mm (6 ft 1 5/8 in)
- Length
  - Over beams: 14,482 mm (47 ft 6 1/4 in)
- Axle load: 14.4–14.9 t (14.2–14.7 long tons; 15.9–16.4 short tons)
- Adhesive weight: 28.8–29.8 t (28.3–29.3 long tons; 31.7–32.8 short tons)
- Service weight: 43.0–44.2 t (42.3–43.5 long tons; 47.4–48.7 short tons)
- Water cap.: 12.0 m^{3} (2,600 imp gal; 3,200 US gal)
- Boiler pressure: 12 kgf/cm^{2} (1,180 kPa; 171 lbf/in^{2})
- Heating surface
  - Firebox: 1.95 m^{2} (21.0 sq ft)
  - Evaporative: 99.00 or 100.70 m^{2} (1,065.6 or 1,083.9 sq ft)
- Cylinders: 2
- High-pressure cylinder: 430 mm (16 15/16 in)
- Low-pressure cylinder: 610 mm (24 in)
- Piston stroke: 610 mm (24 in)
- Loco brake: Westinghouse compressed air brakes
Performance figures
- Maximum speed: 90 km/h (56 mph)
Career
- Numbers: 920 METZ to 942 HEIDELBERG
- Retired: by 1924

The B X steam engines of the Royal Bavarian State Railways (Königlich Bayerische Staatsbahn) were express 2-4-0 locomotives in Bavaria. The vehicles had an inside locomotive frame, the cylinders lay behind the carrying axle and the steam inlet pipes ran in front of the boiler. Twelve locomotives were delivered with compound engines; two with simple, two-cylinder engines. The latter were converted to compound working in 1896 however.

All examples were taken on by the Deutsche Reichsbahn and retired between 1922 and 1924. According to the provisional renumbering plan of 1923 they were to be allocated operating numbers 34 7501 to 7513, but they did not appear in the final renumbering plan.

The engines were equipped with Bavarian 3 T 12 tenders.

== See also ==
- Royal Bavarian State Railways
- List of Bavarian locomotives and railbuses
