= Bavarian B I =

Type and origin
- Build date: 1847ff.
Specifications
- Configuration
  - Whyte: 2-4-0
- Gauge: 1,435 mm (4 ft 8 1/2 in)
- Leading dia.: 915 mm (3 ft 0 in)
- Driver dia.: 1,372 or 1,400 mm (4 ft 6 in or 4 ft 7 1/8 in)
- Length
  - Over beams: 12,585 or 13,670 mm (41 ft 3 1/2 in or 44 ft 10 1/4 in)
- Axle load: 8.5 or 8.7 t (8.4 or 8.6 long tons; 9.4 or 9.6 short tons)
- Adhesive weight: 17.1 or 17.4 t (16.8 or 17.1 long tons; 18.8 or 19.2 short tons)
- Service weight: 24.8 or 26.0 t (24.4 or 25.6 long tons; 27.3 or 28.7 short tons)
- Water cap.: 4.2 or 5.0 m^{3} (920 or 1,100 imp gal; 1,100 or 1,300 US gal)
- Boiler pressure: 6 or 8 kgf/cm^{2} (588 or 785 kPa; 85.3 or 114 lbf/in^{2})
- Heating surface
  - Firebox: 0.86 or 0.93 m^{2} (9.3 or 10.0 sq ft)
  - Evaporative: 79.90 or 74.50 m^{2} (860.0 or 801.9 sq ft)
- Cylinders: 2
- Cylinder size: 381 mm (15 in)
- Piston stroke: 610 mm (24 in)
Performance figures
- Maximum speed: 65 km/h (40 mph)
Career
- Retired: 1896

Bavarian B I engines were 2-4-0 steam locomotives of the Royal Bavarian State Railways (Königlich Bayerische Staatsbahn).

The Class B I was developed in parallel with the Class A II, but had a coupled axle instead of a second carrying axle. As a result, it developed a higher tractive effort. It also had a Stephenson Long Boiler, forked frame and an outside Stephenson valve gear with outside cylinders. The coupling rods were based on an American prototype. Later many of the engines were fitted with a Crampton boiler.

They were coupled to 3 T 4.2, and later 3 T 5, tenders.

== See also ==
- List of Bavarian locomotives and railbuses
