= Bavarian D IV (Ostbahn) =

Bavarian D IV DRG Class 88.70
Type and origin
- Build date: 1867–1872
- Total produced: 12
Specifications
- Configuration
  - Whyte: 0-4-0
- Gauge: 1,435 mm (4 ft 8 1/2 in)
- Length
  - Over beams: 7,680 mm (25 ft 2 1/4 in)
- Axle load: 12.0 or 13.8 t (11.8 or 13.6 long tons; 13.2 or 15.2 short tons)
- Adhesive weight: 24.0 or 27.5 t (23.6 or 27.1 long tons; 26.5 or 30.3 short tons)
- Service weight: 24.0 or 27.5 t (23.6 or 27.1 long tons; 26.5 or 30.3 short tons)
- Boiler pressure: 7 or 8 kgf/cm^{2} (686 or 785 kPa; 99.6 or 114 lbf/in^{2})
- Heating surface
  - Firebox: 1.05 or 1.10 m^{2} (11.3 or 11.8 sq ft)
  - Evaporative: 72.5 or 65.5 m^{2} (780 or 705 sq ft)
- Cylinders: Two
- Cylinder size: 349 or 356 mm (13 3/4 or 14 in)
- Piston stroke: 508 mm (20 in)
Performance figures
- Maximum speed: 45 or 50 km/h (28 or 31 mph)
Career
- Numbers: BOB: D1–D12; K.Bay.Sts.E.: 1178–1189; DRG: 88 7021– 88 7026
- Retired: mid-1920s

The Bavarian Class D IV was a German steam locomotive with the Bavarian Eastern Railway (Bayrische Ostbahn).

These engines had inside frames and Allan valve gear and were delivered in three series, that differed from one another in their dimensions. The original classification D was adopted by the Royal Bavarian State Railways (Königlich Bayerische Staatsbahn) and amended to D IV. Initially, all the engines were taken over by the Deutsche Reichsbahn. However, only six vehicles were given running numbers (88 7021–7026). By the late 1920s, they were all either retired or sold.

== See also ==
- Royal Bavarian State Railways
- List of Bavarian locomotives and railbuses
