= Bavarian B V =

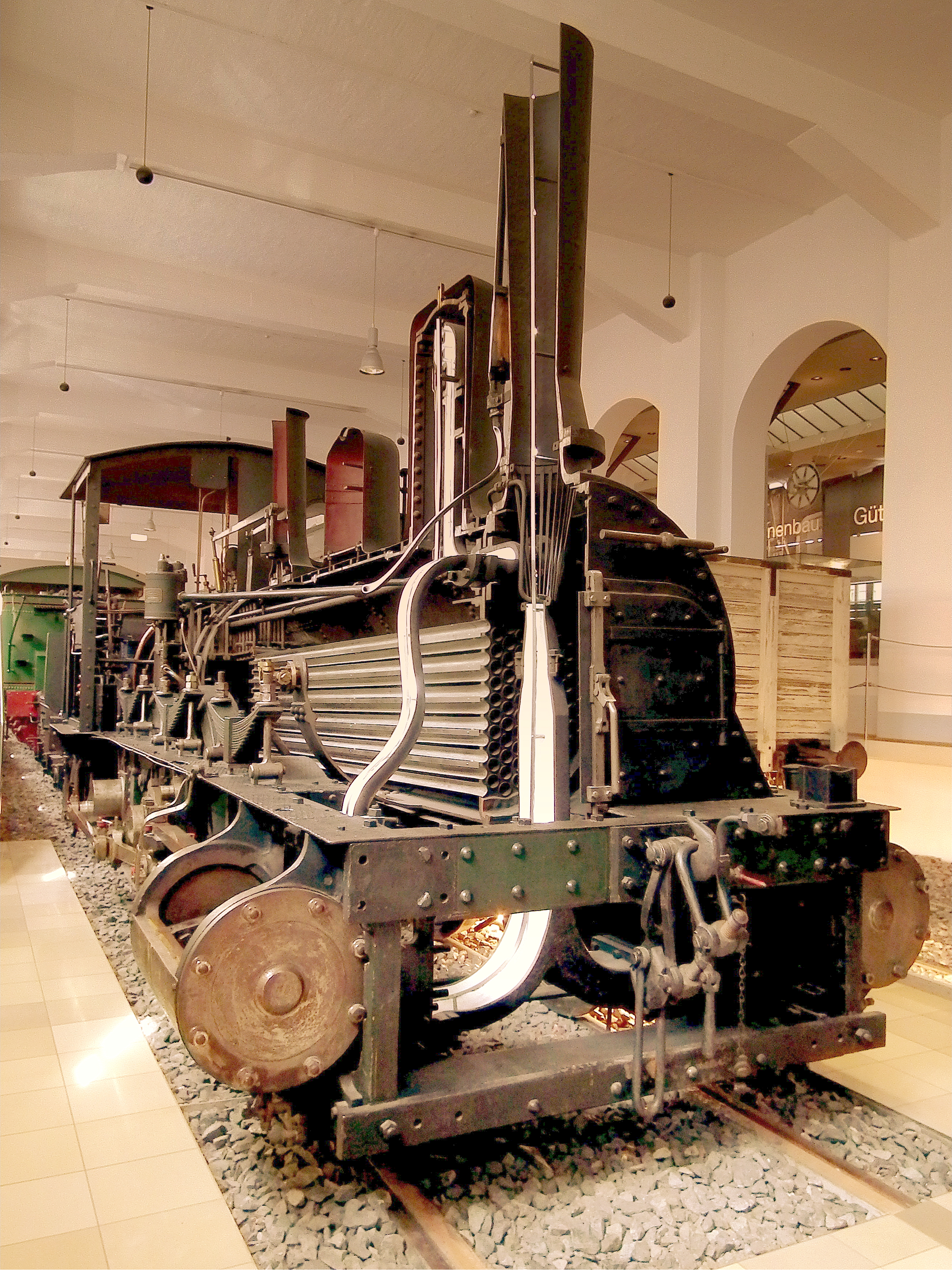
- Nordgau in the Nuremberg Museum, April 2012
Type and origin
- Build date: 1853–1862
- Total produced: 101
Specifications
- Configuration
  - Whyte: 2-4-0
- Gauge: 1,435 mm (4 ft 8 1/2 in)
- Leading dia.: 1,150 mm (3 ft 9 1/4 in)
- Driver dia.: 1,448–1,470 mm (4 ft 9 in – 4 ft 9 7/8 in)
- Length
  - Over beams: 13,609–13,910 mm (44 ft 7 3/4 in – 45 ft 7 3/4 in)
- Axle load: 10.2 t (10.0 long tons; 11.2 short tons)
- Adhesive weight: 20.5 t (20.2 long tons; 22.6 short tons)
- Service weight: 30.0 t (29.5 long tons; 33.1 short tons)
- Tender weight: 6.5 or 7.0 m^{3} (1,400 or 1,500 imp gal; 1,700 or 1,800 US gal)
- Boiler pressure: 8 or 10 kgf/cm^{2} (785 or 981 kPa; 114 or 142 lbf/in^{2})
- Heating surface
  - Firebox: 1.19–1.31 m^{2} (12.8–14.1 sq ft)
  - Evaporative: 86.90–90.20 m^{2} (935.4–970.9 sq ft)
- Cylinders: 2
- Cylinder size: 406 mm (16 in)
- Piston stroke: 610 mm (24 in)
Performance figures
- Maximum speed: 70 km/h (43 mph)
Career
- Retired: 1925

The Bavarian B V (Bayerische B V) steam engines were early German 2-4-0 locomotives of the Royal Bavarian State Railways (Königlich Bayerische Staats-Eisenbahnen).

They were the first locomotives produced in Bavaria in large numbers — 101 in all. The first series of 14 locomotives was similar in many respects to the Class A V. The second series of 15 locomotives had Crampton boilers. The first two series were built without a steam dome on the boiler, but were later fitted with domes. The third series had steam domes on the rear section of the boiler. The fourth and last series had one at the front. All were equipped with Class 3 T 6.5 and 3 T 7 tenders.

One example — the Nordgau — is in the Nuremberg Transport Museum (Verkehrsmuseum Nürnberg). Built by Maffei in 1853, and remaining in service until 1907, it is the oldest preserved locomotive in Germany. Nordgau was sectioned lengthwise in 1925 in the main workshop at Munich, in order to provide a visual display of the operation of a steam locomotive.

== See also ==
- Royal Bavarian State Railways
- List of Bavarian locomotives and railbuses
