= Bavarian B IX (Ostbahn) =

Bavarian B IX
Number(s):	1081–1092	1069–1080
Quantity:	12	12
Manufacturer:	Keßler, Maffei	Maffei
Year(s) of manufacture:	1857–1858	1859ff.
Retired:	1926	1903
Wheel arrangement (Whyte):	4-2-0	2-2-2
Axle arrangement (UIC):	2A n2	1A1 n2
Track gauge:	1,435 mm (4 ft 8 1/2 in)	
Length over buffers:	13,710 mm (44 ft 11 3/4 in)	11,850 mm (38 ft 10 1/2 in)
Service weight:	25.9 t (25.5 long tons; 28.5 short tons)	
Adhesive weight:	10.5 t (10.3 long tons; 11.6 short tons)	
Top speed:	90 km/h (56 mph)	
Driving wheel diameter:	1,828 mm (6 ft 0 in)	
Leading wheel diameter:	1,220 mm (4 ft 0 in)	
Trailing wheel diameter:	—	1,220 mm (4 ft 0 in)
No. of cylinders:	Two	
Cylinder bore:	394 mm (15 1/2 in)	
Piston stroke:	610 mm (24 in)	
Boiler overpressure:	6 kgf/cm^{2} (590 kPa; 85 lbf/in^{2})	
Grate area:	1.13 m^{2} (12.2 sq ft)	1.12 m^{2} (12.1 sq ft)
Evaporative heating area:	83.20 m^{2} (895.6 sq ft)	80.00 m^{2} (861.1 sq ft)
Tender:	3 T 7	
Water capacity:	7.0 m^{3} (1,500 imp gal; 1,800 US gal)	

The Bavarian Class A, later B IX were German steam locomotives with the Bavarian Eastern Railway (Bayerische Ostbahn).

== Crampton version ==
The engines had an external frame with outside drive and valve gear. They had the smallest wheel diameter (1,828 mm) of any locomotive of this type in the whole of Germany. Between 1869 and 1871 all the engines were rebuilt in Regensburg and were given a 1 B axle arrangement. They were then given locomotive numbers 1081–1092.

== Stephenson version ==
The second series of this class was built to a Stephenson design. They did not differ greatly in terms of boiler and driving gear from the locomotives of the first series. These engines were also converted in Regensburg between 1870 and 1871 to vehicles with a 1B axle formula. In addition the boiler overpressure was raised from 6 to 10 bar. They were then given locomotive numbers 1069–1080.

== Tender ==
Both series were equipped with 3 T 7 tenders.

== See also ==
- Royal Bavarian State Railways
- List of Bavarian locomotives and railbuses
