= LAG Nos. 9 and 10 =

LAG Nos. 9 and 10 Bavarian PtL 3/3 DRG Class 98.76
Type and origin
- Builder: Krauss
- Build date: 1889
- Total produced: 2
Specifications
- Configuration
  - Whyte: 0-6-0T
- Gauge: 1,435 mm (4 ft 8 1/2 in)
- Driver dia.: 925 mm (3 ft 3/8 in)
- Length
  - Over beams: 7,565 mm (24 ft 9 3/4 in)
- Axle load: 9.5 t (9.3 long tons; 10.5 short tons)
- Adhesive weight: 27.3 t (26.9 long tons; 30.1 short tons)
- Service weight: 27.3 t (26.9 long tons; 30.1 short tons)
- Boiler pressure: 11 kgf/cm^{2} (1,080 kPa; 156 lbf/in^{2})
- Heating surface
  - Firebox: 1.0 m^{2} (11 sq ft)
  - Evaporative: 54.6 m^{2} (588 sq ft)
- Cylinder size: 350 mm (13 3/4 in)
- Piston stroke: 500 mm (19 11/16 in)
Performance figures
- Maximum speed: 45 km/h (28 mph)
- Indicated power: 175 PS (129 kW; 173 hp)
Career
- Numbers: LAG: 9 and 10; K.Bay.Sts.E: 1875 and 1876 DRG: 98 7691 and 98 7692
- Retired: 1927

Locomotives 9 and 10 of the Lokalbahn AG (LAG) were saturated steam locomotives that were built for the Murnau - Garmisch-Partenkirchen route opened in 1889.

These locomotives were supplied by Krauss and were similar to the Bavarian D VII (Bayerische D VII) engines, but they had smaller coupled wheels and a larger heating and grate area.

In 1908 the Royal Bavarian State Railways (Königlich Bayerische Staatsbahn) purchased the line and the two locomotives with it. They were operated as the Bavarian Class PtL 3/3 and were given the numbers 1875 and 1876.

In 1925 the Deutsche Reichsbahn-Gesellschaft took over both engines as the DRG Class 98.76 (Baureihe 98.76), but had retired them by 1927.

== See also ==
- Royal Bavarian State Railways
- Lokalbahn AG
- List of Bavarian locomotives and railbuses
