= Bavarian D IX =

Bavarian D IX DRG Class 70.71
Type and origin
- Builder: Maffei
- Build date: 1888–1899
- Total produced: 55
Specifications
- Configuration
  - Whyte: 2-4-0T
- Gauge: 1,435 mm (4 ft 8 1/2 in)
- Leading dia.: 1,040 mm (3 ft 5 in)
- Driver dia.: 1,340 mm (4 ft 4 3/4 in)
- Length
  - Over beams: 8,440 mm (27 ft 8 1/4 in)
- Axle load: 12.4 t (12.2 long tons; 13.7 short tons)
- Adhesive weight: 24.8 t (24.4 long tons; 27.3 short tons)
- Service weight: 35.8 t (35.2 long tons; 39.5 short tons)
- Boiler pressure: 12 kgf/cm^{2} (1,180 kPa; 171 lbf/in^{2})
- Heating surface
  - Firebox: 1.20 m^{2} (12.9 sq ft)
  - Evaporative: 60.20 m^{2} (648.0 sq ft)
- Cylinder size: 330 mm (13 in)
- Piston stroke: 500 mm (19 11/16 in)
Performance figures
- Maximum speed: 65 km/h (40 mph)
Career
- Numbers: K.Bay.Sts.E: 1931–1960, 2101–2115; DRG: 70 7101 – 70 7154
- Retired: 1932

The D IX steam locomotive was manufactured by the firm of Maffei between 1888 and 1899 for the Royal Bavarian State Railways (Königlich Bayerische Staatsbahn). They were used on the route from Reichenhall via Freilassing to Salzburg. After one engine had been successfully employed on the route to Berchtesgaden, the vehicles were also deployed on the suburban lines of Augsburg, Munich and Nuremberg.

There were scarcely any differences between the various build series. Not until 1896 were minor changes made to the heating areas, the weights and the coal and water capacities. The rigid mounting of the driving and carrying wheels and the location of the cylinder just in front of the carrying wheel did not prove a success. The D IX locomotives could haul 170 tonnes (170 long tons; 190 short tons) on the flat at a speed of 65 km/h (40 mph), on routes with a 2% incline they could manage 95 tonnes (93 long tons; 105 short tons) at 20 km/h (12 mph).

Apart from one engine, which had already been retired by Bavaria, the Reichsbahn took on all the engines. Some were taken out of service even before 1925, the rest had followed by 1932.

No examples of the Bavarian D IX have been preserved.

== See also ==
- Royal Bavarian State Railways
- List of Bavarian locomotives and railbuses
