= Bavarian B V (Ostbahn) =

Type and origin
- Build date: 1869
- Total produced: 2
Specifications
- Configuration
  - Whyte: 0-4-0
- Gauge: 1,435 mm (4 ft 8 1/2 in)
- Driver dia.: 1,524 or 1,545 mm (5 ft 0 in or 5 ft 7/8 in)
- Length
  - Over beams: 13,170 mm (43 ft 2 1/2 in)
- Adhesive weight: 27.0–28.5 t (26.6–28.0 long tons; 29.8–31.4 short tons)
- Service weight: 27.0–28.5 t (26.6–28.0 long tons; 29.8–31.4 short tons)
- Water cap.: 8.0 m^{3} (1,800 imp gal; 2,100 US gal)
- Boiler pressure: 8 or 9 kgf/cm^{2} (785 or 883 kPa; 114 or 128 lbf/in^{2})
- Heating surface
  - Firebox: 1.43 m^{2} (15.4 sq ft)
  - Evaporative: 91.00–106.00 m^{2} (979.5–1,141.0 sq ft)
- Cylinders: 2
- Cylinder size: 419 mm (16 1/2 in)
- Piston stroke: 610 mm (24 in)
Career
- Numbers: new: E 1, E 2; from 1872: A 1, A 2; K.Bay.Sts.E: 1001, 1002
- Retired: 1904

The Bavarian Class B V steam locomotives were operated by the Bavarian Eastern Railway (Bayerische Ostbahn) in Germany.

They had an external frame with outer valve gear and a Belpaire boiler.

They were equipped with 2 T 8 tenders.

== See also ==
- Royal Bavarian State Railways
- List of Bavarian locomotives and railbuses
