= Bavarian ML 2/2 =

Steam locomotive class

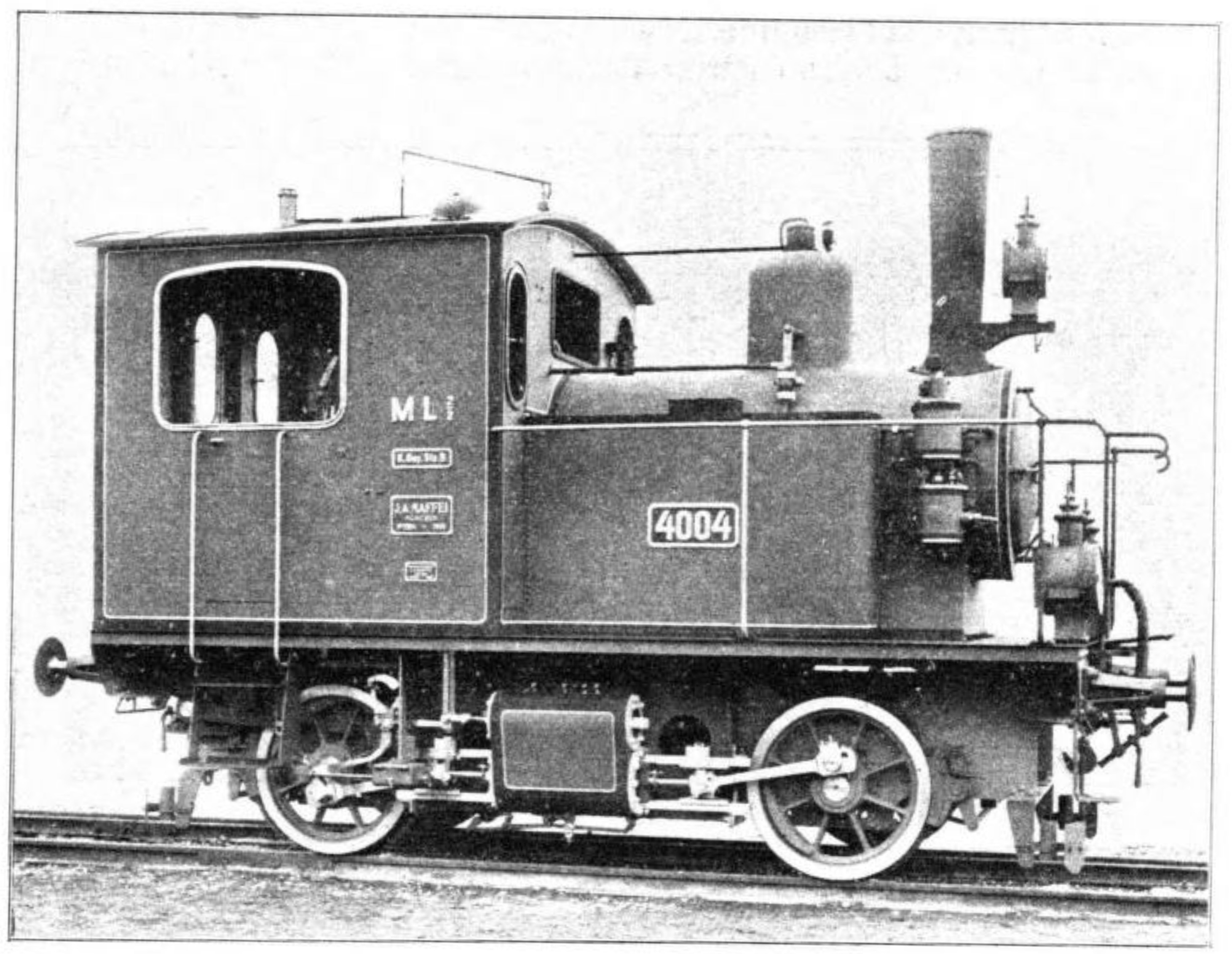
- Works photo of 1908
Type and origin
- Builder: Maffei
- Build date: 1906–1908
- Total produced: 24
Specifications
- Configuration
  - Whyte: 0-4-0T (axles coupled internally and often mistaken as an 0-2-2-0T because the wheels are connected to outside cylinders between them)
- Gauge: 1,435 mm (4 ft 8 1/2 in)
- Driver dia.: 990 mm (3 ft 3 in)
- Length
  - Over beams: 6,570 mm (21 ft 6 3/4 in)
- Axle load: 11.0 t (10.8 long tons; 12.1 short tons)
- Adhesive weight: 22.0 t (21.7 long tons; 24.3 short tons)
- Service weight: 22.0 t (21.7 long tons; 24.3 short tons)
- Boiler pressure: 12 kgf/cm^{2} (1,180 kPa; 171 lbf/in^{2})
- Heating surface
  - Firebox: 0.83 m^{2} (8.9 sq ft)
  - Evaporative: 35.50 or 42.00 m^{2} (382.1 or 452.1 sq ft)
- Cylinders: 2
- Cylinder size: 265 mm (10 7/16 in)
- Piston stroke: 280 mm (11 in)
Performance figures
- Maximum speed: 50 km/h (31 mph)
- Indicated power: 200 PS (147 kW; 197 hp)
Career
- Numbers: K.Bay.Sts.E: 4001–4024; DRG: 98 361–384 (planned)
- Retired: 1924

The Class ML 2/2 locomotives of the Royal Bavarian State Railways (Königlich Bayerische Staatsbahn) were light and very compact superheated steam locomotives designed for services on branch lines (Lokalbahnen). They were a rival design by Maffei to the Bavarian PtL 2/2 or Glaskasten locomotives built by Krauss.

In common with the Krauss engines the ML 2/2 had the axle arrangement B, semi-automatic gravity firing that enabled one-man operation, and gangways with railings, front and rear, that allowed safe transit to the coaches. The valve gear was, however, a completely different affair. These locomotives had two external cylinders each with opposing pistons that were positioned between the two axles. The axles were linked via coupling rod on the inside.

In 1906 Maffei delivered the first three locomotives (railway numbers 4001–4003). In spite of the unusual (and for a two-cylinder locomotive, extremely complicated) gear system, the engines proved themselves, and Maffei supplied another 21 examples up to 1908 (Nos. 4004–4024). The positive experience with these locomotives also led to the construction of the Class MCCi steam railbus, whose driven bogie and boiler were very similar to those of the ML 2/2.

Three locomotives were sold to the United Fireclay Factories (Vereinigten Schamottefabriken) in Marktredwitz in 1922. The remaining machines were all including in the renumbering plan of the Deutsche Reichsbahn-Gesellschaft in 1923 as 98 361-384. However, they were retired by 1924. The reason was the complicated and maintenance-intensive driving gear.

== See also ==
- Royal Bavarian State Railways
- List of Bavarian locomotives and railbuses
