= Bavarian D II (Ostbahn) =

Type of German locomotive

Bayrische Ostbahn D13 and D14 Bavarian D II^{I}
Type and origin
- Builder: Maffei
- Build date: 1866
- Total produced: 2
Specifications
- Configuration
  - Whyte: 0-4-0T
- Gauge: 1,435 mm (4 ft 8 1/2 in)
- Driver dia.: 1,024 mm (3 ft 4 3/8 in)
- Wheelbase
  - Overall: 1,835 mm (6 ft 1/4 in)
- Length
  - Over beams: 5,820 mm (19 ft 1 1/4 in)
- Axle load: 5.8 t (5.7 long tons; 6.4 short tons)
- Adhesive weight: 11.5 t (11.3 long tons; 12.7 short tons)
- Service weight: 11.5 t (11.3 long tons; 12.7 short tons)
- Fuel capacity: 300 kg (660 lb) coal
- Water cap.: 1.17 m^{3} (260 imp gal; 310 US gal)
- Boiler pressure: 7 kg/cm^{2} (686 kPa; 99.6 lbf/in^{2})
- Heating surface
  - Firebox: 0.45 m^{2} (4.8 sq ft)
  - Evaporative: 22.50 m^{2} (242.2 sq ft)
- Cylinders: Two
- Cylinder size: 228 mm (9 in)
- Piston stroke: 381 mm (15 in)
- Valve gear: Stephenson
Performance figures
- Maximum speed: 45 km/h (28 mph)
Career
- Numbers: D 13 and D 14; from 1892: 1176–1177
- Retired: 1895

The Bavarian Class D II was a German goods train tender locomotive with the Bavarian Eastern Railway (Bayrische Ostbahn).

The two engines, with the names Deggendorf und Bayrischer Wald were built by the Deggendorf-Plattling Railway for their branch line and taken over in 1867 by the Ostbahn. On the nationalisation of the Ostbahn, the Royal Bavarian State Railways initially incorporated the engines into group E, and later into group D as the Class D II.

== See also ==
- Royal Bavarian State Railways
- List of Bavarian locomotives and railbuses
