= Bavarian C I =

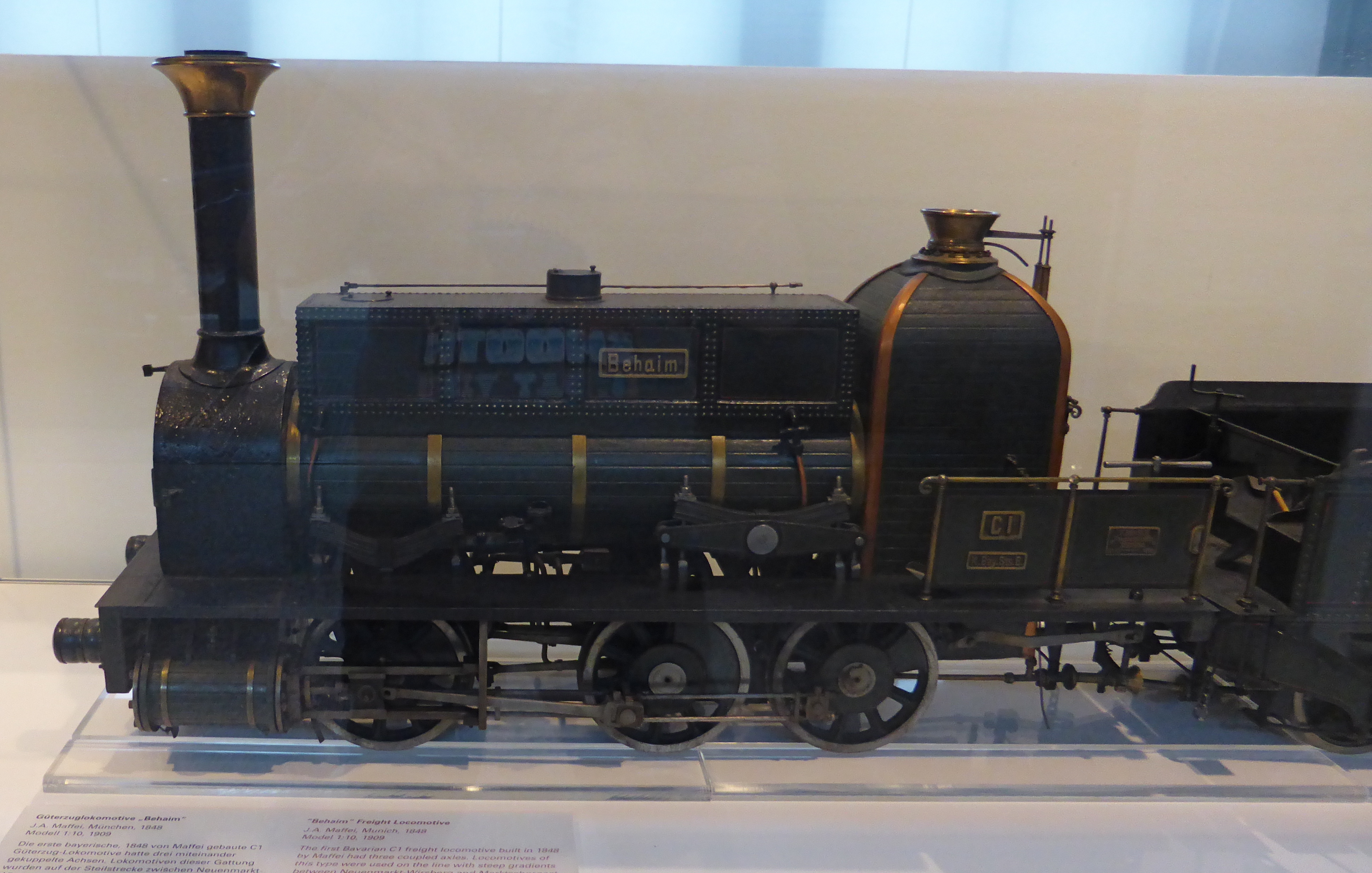
- Model of the C I "BEHAIM" in the Verkehrszentrum München
Type and origin
- Builder: Maffei
- Build date: 1847–1849
- Total produced: 5
Specifications
- Configuration
  - Whyte: 0-6-0
- Gauge: 1,435 mm (4 ft 8 1/2 in)
- Driver dia.: 1,069 or 1,098 mm (3 ft 6 1/8 in or 3 ft 7 1/4 in)
- Length
  - Over beams: 12,401 mm (40 ft 8 1/4 in)
- Axle load: 10.5 t (10.3 long tons; 11.6 short tons)
- Adhesive weight: 24.9 t (24.5 long tons; 27.4 short tons)
- Empty weight: 22 t (22 long tons; 24 short tons)
- Service weight: 24.9 t (24.5 long tons; 27.4 short tons)
- Tender type: 2 T 4.2
- Fuel capacity: 3 m^{3} coal
- Water cap.: 4.22 m^{3} (930 imp gal; 1,110 US gal)
- Boiler
- No. of heating tubes: 160 or 119
- Heating tube length: 3,860 or 3,756 mm (12 ft 8 in or 12 ft 3 3/4 in)
- Boiler pressure: 5.6 or 10 kgf/cm^{2} (550 or 980 kPa; 80 or 142 lbf/in^{2})
- Heating surface
  - Firebox: 0.39 or 0.91 m^{2} (4.2 or 9.8 sq ft)
  - Evaporative: 72 or 56.7 m^{2} (775 or 610 sq ft)
- Cylinders: 2
- Cylinder size: 406 mm (16 in)
- Piston stroke: 609 mm (24 in)
Performance figures
- Maximum speed: 40 km/h (25 mph)
Career
- Retired: 1885–1895
- Where 2 sets of figures are shown, the second applies to the engine with its replacement boiler

Bavarian C Is were steam locomotives with the Royal Bavarian State Railways (Königlich Bayerische Staatsbahn).

They were the first six-coupled engines in Bavaria and were developed specially for the route between Neuenmarkt, Wirsberg and Marktschorgast. This route had inclines up to 1:40. The loco had an inside frame, a boiler barrel without a steam dome, an inside Stephenson valve gear, single-sided, suspended Taschenkulissen and a rectangular ballast tank on the boiler barrel to increase the adhesion effect. A total of five were built by Maffei. They were named: SCHARRER, BEHAIM, LEIBNIZ, SAALE and SCHNEEBERG. There is a finely detailed 1:10 scale model of BEHAIM in the Nuremberg Transport Museum.

They were equipped with Bavarian tenders of the class 2 T 4.2 type.

== Sources ==
- von Welser, Ludwig. Bayern Report, Band No. 4. Eisenbahn Journal Archiv. ISBN 3-922404-69-3.

== See also ==
- List of Bavarian locomotives and railbuses
