= Bavarian B XI =

Bavarian B XI Zwilling (two-cylinder simple) DRG Class 36.7–8
Type and origin
- Builder: Maffei
- Build date: 1892–1893
- Total produced: 39
Specifications
- Configuration
  - Whyte: 4-4-0
- Gauge: 1,435 mm (4 ft 8 1/2 in)
- Leading dia.: 1,006 mm (3 ft 3 5/8 in)
- Driver dia.: 1,870 mm (6 ft 1 5/8 in)
- Wheelbase
  - incl. tender: 12,895 mm (42 ft 3 3/4 in) ^{1}; 13,970 mm (45 ft 10 in) ^{2}
- Length
  - Over beams: 15,979 mm (52 ft 5 in) ^{1}; 16,885 mm (55 ft 4 3/4 in) ^{2}
- Axle load: 14.3 t (14.1 long tons; 15.8 short tons)
- Adhesive weight: 28.5 t (28.0 long tons; 31.4 short tons)
- Service weight: 50.4 t (49.6 long tons; 55.6 short tons)
- Tender weight: 36.0 or 43.0 t (35.4 or 42.3 long tons; 39.7 or 47.4 short tons)
- Tender type: bay 3 T 14.5 or; bay 2′2′ T 18
- Fuel capacity: 6.0 or 6.5 t (5.91 or 6.40 long tons; 6.61 or 7.17 short tons) of coal
- Water cap.: 14.5 or 18.0 m^{3} (3,190 or 3,960 imp gal; 3,830 or 4,760 US gal)
- Boiler pressure: 12 kg/cm^{2} (1,180 kPa; 171 lbf/in^{2})
- Heating surface
  - Firebox: 2.24 m^{2} (24.1 sq ft)
  - Evaporative: 116.2 m^{2} (1,251 sq ft)
- Cylinders: Two, simple
- Cylinder size: 430 mm (16 15/16 in)
- Piston stroke: 610 mm (24 in)
- Valve gear: Walschaerts (Heusinger), outside
Performance figures
- Maximum speed: 90 km/h (56 mph)
Career
- Numbers: K.Bay.Sts.E.: 1201–1239; DRG: 36 701 – 36 708
- Retired: by 1926
- ^{1} with bay 3 T 14.5 tender^{2} with bay 2′2′ T 18 tender

Bavaian B XI Verbund (two-cylinder compound) DRG Class 36.7–8
Type and origin
- Builder: Maffei; Krauss
- Build date: 1895–1900
- Total produced: 100
Specifications
- Wheelbase
  - incl. tender: 14,095 mm (46 ft 3 in)
- Length
  - Over beams: 16,986 mm (55 ft 8 3/4 in)
- Axle load: 14.4 t (14.2 long tons; 15.9 short tons); 14.8 t (14.6 long tons; 16.3 short tons) ^{3}
- Adhesive weight: 28.8 t (28.3 long tons; 31.7 short tons); 29.6 t (29.1 long tons; 32.6 short tons) ^{3}
- Service weight: 51.0 t (50.2 long tons; 56.2 short tons); 51.5 t (50.7 long tons; 56.8 short tons) ^{3}
- Tender weight: 43.0 t (42.3 long tons; 47.4 short tons)
- Tender type: bay 2′2′ T 18
- Fuel capacity: 6.5 t (6.40 long tons; 7.17 short tons) of coal
- Water cap.: 18.0 m^{3} (3,960 imp gal; 4,760 US gal)
- Boiler pressure: 13 kg/cm^{2} (1,270 kPa; 185 lbf/in^{2})
- Heating surface
  - Firebox: 2.26 m^{2} (24.3 sq ft)
  - Evaporative: 116.8 m^{2} (1,257 sq ft)
- Cylinders: Two, compound
- High-pressure cylinder: 455 mm (17 15/16 in)
- Low-pressure cylinder: 670 mm (26 3/8 in)
- Piston stroke: 610 mm (24 in)
Career
- Numbers: K.Bay.Sts.E.: 1240–1339; DRG: 36 751 – 36 826
- Retired: by 1931
- ^{3} from no. 1318; Only differences from above shown

The Class B XI engines of the Royal Bavarian State Railways (Königlich Bayerische Staatsbahn) were built between 1895 and 1900 by the firm of Maffei for deployment in Bavaria. The first delivery comprised 39 vehicles with two-cylinder, saturated steam operation, a further 100 two-cylinder compound locomotives followed in the period up to 1900.

The Deutsche Reichsbahn took over 8 engines from the first batch as Class 36.7, with operating numbers 36 701 to 36 708, and 76 of the second batch, with numbers 36 751 to 36 826.

These steam locomotives were equipped with Bavarian 3 T 12, 3 T 14.5 and 2'2' T 18 tenders. These vehicles were the first locos that were give a four-axle tender.

== See also ==
- Royal Bavarian State Railways
- List of Bavarian locomotives and railbuses
