= Bavarian C II (Ostbahn) =

Type and origin
- Build date: 1862–1863
Specifications
- Configuration
  - Whyte: 0-6-0
- Gauge: 1,435 mm (4 ft 8 1/2 in)
- Driver dia.: 1,524 or 1,540 mm (5 ft 0 in or 5 ft 5/8 in)
- Length
  - Over beams: 14,150 mm (46 ft 5 in)
- Axle load: 11.3 or 12.2 t (11.1 or 12.0 long tons; 12.5 or 13.4 short tons)
- Adhesive weight: 35.5 t (34.9 long tons; 39.1 short tons) or; 36.5 t (35.9 long tons; 40.2 short tons) or; 38.5 t (37.9 long tons; 42.4 short tons)
- Service weight: 35.5 t (34.9 long tons; 39.1 short tons) or; 36.5 t (35.9 long tons; 40.2 short tons) or; 38.5 t (37.9 long tons; 42.4 short tons)
- Water cap.: 9.0 m^{3} (2,000 imp gal; 2,400 US gal)
- Boiler pressure: 6 kgf/cm^{2} (588 kPa; 85.3 lbf/in^{2}) or; 9 kgf/cm^{2} (883 kPa; 128 lbf/in^{2}) or; 10 kgf/cm^{2} (981 kPa; 142 lbf/in^{2})
- Heating surface
  - Firebox: 1.50 m^{2} (16.1 sq ft) or; 1.61 m^{2} (17.3 sq ft) or; 1.65 m^{2} (17.8 sq ft)
  - Evaporative: 121.50 m^{2} (1,307.8 sq ft) or; 107.00 m^{2} (1,151.7 sq ft) or; 15.00 m^{2} (161.5 sq ft)
- Cylinders: Two
- Cylinder size: 508 mm (20 in)
- Piston stroke: 660 mm (26 in)
Performance figures
- Maximum speed: 45 km/h (28 mph)
Career
- Retired: 1910

The Bavarian Class C, later C II, was a German steam locomotive with the Bavarian Eastern Railway (Bayerische Ostbahn).

These engines were the first six-coupled vehicles in Bavaria with external frames. In addition, they had Stephenson valve gear and, because the final axle was driven, a very long connecting rod with a Hall crank (Hallscher Kurbel). Because of its large wheel diameter, it could also be used to haul passenger trains.

The locomotives were equipped with 3 T 9 tenders.

== See also ==
- Royal Bavarian State Railways
- List of Bavarian locomotives and railbuses
