= Bavarian A II =

Type and origin
- Builder: Kessler, Maffei
- Build date: 1847–1848
- Total produced: 13
Specifications
- Configuration
  - Whyte: 2-2-2
- Gauge: 1,435 mm (4 ft 8 1/2 in)
- Leading dia.: 915 mm (3 ft 0 in)
- Driver dia.: 1,524 mm (5 ft 0 in)
- Trailing dia.: 915 mm (3 ft 0 in)
- Length
  - Over beams: 12,496 mm (41 ft 0 in)
- Axle load: 7.6 t (7.5 long tons; 8.4 short tons)
- Adhesive weight: 7.6 t (7.5 long tons; 8.4 short tons)
- Service weight: 21.8 t (21.5 long tons; 24.0 short tons)
- Water cap.: 4.2 m^{3} (920 imp gal; 1,100 US gal)
- Boiler pressure: 6 kgf/cm^{2} (588 kPa; 85.3 lbf/in^{2})
- Heating surface
  - Firebox: 0.83 m^{2} (8.9 sq ft)
  - Evaporative: 71.00 m^{2} (764.2 sq ft)
- Cylinders: 2
- Cylinder size: 318 mm (12 1/2 in)
- Piston stroke: 559 mm (22 in)
Performance figures
- Maximum speed: 45 km/h (28 mph)
Career
- Numbers: Names and inventory nos.
- Retired: by 1877 (some were converted)

The Bavarian A II engines were early German 2-2-2 steam locomotives with the Royal Bavarian State Railways (Königlich Bayerische Staatsbahn).

The locomotives were conceived as Stephenson Long Boiler engines. They had an inside forked frame and the firebox was supported by the trailing axle. The only difference between the engines from the two manufacturers was the location of the feed pump. On the Kessler variant this was on the outside and driven by crank pins; on the Maffei version they were suspended from the reverse eccentric cam (Rückwärtsexzenter).

After it was discovered that the riding qualities of the loco were very rough, the trailing axle was moved about 127 mm (5.0 in) further back. In the 1860s the old boiler on some vehicles was replaced by a Crampton boiler. In addition, six engines were rebuilt with a wheel arrangement of 0-6-0 and three into 0-4-2 locomotives. The remainder were taken out of service between 1871 and 1877 and scrapped.

They were coupled with 2 T 4.2 tenders.

== See also ==
- List of Bavarian locomotives and railbuses
