= Bavarian B VII =

Experimental Royal Bavarian State Railways locomotive

Type and origin
- Builder: Krauss
- Build date: 1868
- Total produced: 6
Specifications
- Configuration
  - Whyte: 0-4-0
- Gauge: 1,435 mm (4 ft 8 1/2 in)
- Driver dia.: 1,500 mm (4 ft 11 in)
- Length
  - Over beams: 13,236 mm (43 ft 5 in)
- Axle load: 13.2 t (13.0 long tons; 14.6 short tons)
- Adhesive weight: 26.4 t (26.0 long tons; 29.1 short tons)
- Service weight: 26.4 t (26.0 long tons; 29.1 short tons)
- Water cap.: 6.7 m^{3} (1,500 imp gal; 1,800 US gal)
- Boiler pressure: 7 or 10 kgf/cm^{2} (686 or 981 kPa; 99.6 or 142 lbf/in^{2})
- Heating surface
  - Firebox: 1.24 m^{2} (13.3 sq ft)
  - Evaporative: 101.10 or 117.80 m^{2} (1,088.2 or 1,268.0 sq ft)
- Cylinders: 2
- Cylinder size: 430 mm (16 15/16 in)
- Piston stroke: 610 mm (24 in)
Performance figures
- Maximum speed: 70 km/h (43 mph)
Career
- Numbers: 379 EIBSEE to 384 MAINBERNHEIM
- Retired: 1877

The Bavarian B VII was an experimental locomotive with the Royal Bavarian State Railways (Königlich Bayerische Staatsbahn).

These turf-fired locomotives were the first ones delivered by Krauss to the state railways in Bavaria. They resembled the 0-4-0 vehicles of the Grand Duchy of Oldenburg State Railways (Großherzoglich Oldenburgische Staatseisenbahnen). They were equipped with a water tank frame and Allan valve gear with outside cylinders. They were rebuilt once during its short career, the boiler overpressure being changed. The locomotives, known as the Angry Seven (Böse Sieben) by crews, were retired in 1877 after just 9 years in service.

They were equipped with tenders of the Bavarian class 3 T 6.7.

== See also ==
- Royal Bavarian State Railways
- List of Bavarian locomotives and railbuses
