= Bavarian Krauss railmotor =

MCi
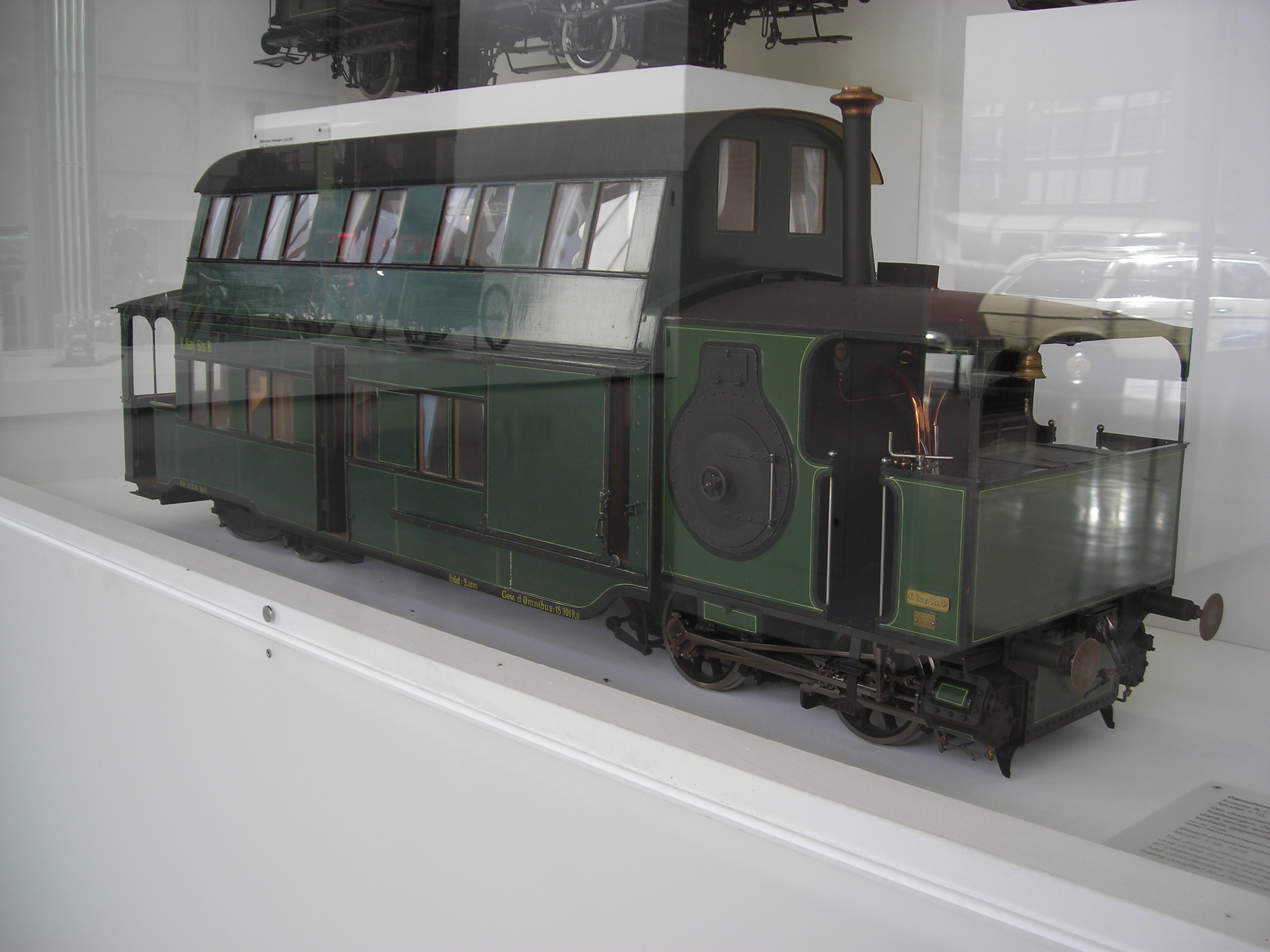
Type and origin
- Builder: Krauss & Co. Works No. 1181
- Build date: 1882
- Total produced: 1
Specifications
- Configuration
  - UIC: B’+B
  - German: MCi
- Gauge: 1,435 mm (4 ft 8 1/2 in)
- Heating surface
  - Radiative: 31 m^{2} (330 sq ft)
- Cylinder pressure: 176.35 psi (1,215.9 kPa)
Performance figures
- Installed power: 100 PS (74 kW; 99 hp)
Career
- Retired: 1882

The double-decked MCi railmotor (German: Dampftriebwagen MCi) was built in 1882 by Krauss and Company with the works number 1181 and delivered to the Royal Bavarian State Railways, who deployed it in the areas of Würzburg and Bamberg.

The steam-powered railbus had a B'2' wheel arrangement, one axle pair being driven by connecting rods. It had a transverse boiler and a gross service weight of 28 t (27.6 long tons; 30.9 short tons). Its Stephenson valve gear and brakes were accessible at both ends. The coach had 67 seats on two floors, the second class seating being on the lower level and the third class being split between both levels.

The vehicle was a one-off and was only in service for a short time.

== Literature ==
- Krauss-Maffei AG und Deutsches Museum München (Hrsg.): Lokomotiven im Deutschen Museum. München ohne Jahresangabe (circa 1977).
- Deutsche Reichsbahn: Hundert Jahre deutsche Eisenbahnen. Jubiläumsschrift zum hundertjährigen Bestehen der deutschen Eisenbahnen. Berlin, 1935, S. 245, Abb. neben S. 248.
