= Bavarian A III =

Type and origin
- Builder: Maffei
- Build date: 1851-1852
- Total produced: 4
Specifications
- Configuration
  - Whyte: 2-2-2
- Gauge: 1,435 mm (4 ft 8 1/2 in)
- Leading dia.: 915 mm (3 ft 0 in)
- Driver dia.: 1,425 mm (4 ft 8 1/8 in)
- Trailing dia.: 915 mm (3 ft 0 in)
- Length
  - Over beams: 11,290 mm (37 ft 1/2 in)
- Service weight: 21.8 t (21.5 long tons; 24.0 short tons)
- Water cap.: 4.2 or 5.0 m^{3} (920 or 1,100 imp gal; 1,100 or 1,300 US gal)
- Boiler pressure: 6 kgf/cm^{2} (588 kPa; 85.3 lbf/in^{2})
- Heating surface
  - Firebox: 0.98 m^{2} (10.5 sq ft)
  - Evaporative: 60.81 m^{2} (654.6 sq ft)
- Cylinders: 2
- Cylinder size: 356 mm (14 in)
- Piston stroke: 559 mm (22 in)
Performance figures
- Maximum speed: 50 km/h (31 mph)
Career
- Numbers: Names and inventory nos.
- Retired: by 1871 (converted)

The Bavarian A III 2-2-2 engines were German steam locomotives in service with the Royal Bavarian State Railways (Königlich Bayerische Staatsbahn).

Once again these engines were used to experiment with a short boiler and Meyer expansion valve gear. Because the additional increase in size of the heating area could not be improved by installing extra tubes, two of each were rebuilt to 0-4-2 and 0-6-2 locomotives. Otherwise their construction was the same as the Class A II engines.

They were equipped with 2 T 4.2 and, following the rebuild, 2 T 5 tenders.

== See also ==
- List of Bavarian locomotives and railbuses
