= Marienstein =

Quarter of Waakirchen, Bavaria, Germany

Coordinates: 47°45′4″N 11°41′05″E

Marienstein is a village in the municipality of Waakirchen in the west Upper Bavarian district of Miesbach.

== History ==
1850/51 The owner of the Oberkammerloh estate built 2 cement ovens and a mill complex. The stone for his cement factory was extracted from Holzwiesenthal quarry where he later moved his business and renamed it after his niece, Maria, to Marienstein.

1852 Herr Deuringer was given mining rights for coal by the Royal Mining Office in Munich. Marienstein became a mining centre until 1962 when the last seam was worked. After the closure of the cement factory in 1998 the community strove to turn the area into an industrial estate.
