= Marktschorgast =

- Municipality
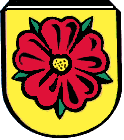
- Coat of arms

- Location of Marktschorgast within Kulmbach district
- Interactive map of Marktschorgast
- Location within Germany Location within Bavaria
- Coordinates: 50°6′N 11°39′E
- Country: Germany
- State: Bavaria
- Admin. region: Oberfranken
- District: Kulmbach
- Subdivisions: 9 Ortsteile

Government
  - Mayor (2020–26): Marc Benker (CSU)

Area
  - Total: 15.82 km^{2} (6.11 sq mi)
- Elevation: 476 m (1,562 ft)

Population (2025-12-31)
  - Total: 1,345
  - Density: 85.02/km^{2} (220.2/sq mi)
- Time zone: UTC+01:00 (CET)
  - Summer (DST): UTC+02:00 (CEST)
- Postal codes: 95509
- Dialling codes: 09227
- Vehicle registration: KU
- Website: www.marktschorgast.de

Marktschorgast is a municipality in the district of Kulmbach in Bavaria in Germany.

== City arrangement ==
Marktschorgast is arranged in the following boroughs:

- Grundmühle
- Marktschorgast
- Mittelpöllitz
- Oberpöllitz
- Pulst
- Rohrersreuth
- Thalmühle
- Unterpöllitz
- Ziegenburg
