= Bavarian A IV =

Type and origin
- Builder: Maffei
- Build date: 1852
- Total produced: 8
Specifications
- Configuration
  - Whyte: 2-2-2
- Gauge: 1,435 mm (4 ft 8 1/2 in)
- Leading dia.: 915 mm (36 in)
- Driver dia.: 1,524 mm (5 ft 0 in)
- Trailing dia.: 915 mm (36 in)
- Length
  - Over beams: 12,459 mm (40 ft 10 1/2 in)
- Axle load: 11.5 t (11.3 long tons; 12.7 short tons)
- Adhesive weight: 11.5 t (11.3 long tons; 12.7 short tons)
- Service weight: 27.9 t (27.5 long tons; 30.8 short tons)
- Water cap.: 5.0 m^{3} (1,100 imp gal; 1,300 US gal)
- Boiler
  - Tube plates: 3,080 mm (10 ft 1 1/4 in)
- Boiler pressure: 7 kgf/cm^{2} (686 kPa; 99.6 lbf/in^{2})
- Heating surface
  - Firebox: 1.21 m^{2} (13.0 sq ft)
  - Evaporative: 73.20 m^{2} (787.9 sq ft)
- Cylinders: 2
- Cylinder size: 381 mm (15 in)
- Piston stroke: 559 mm (22 in)
Performance figures
- Maximum speed: 70 km/h (43 mph)
Career
- Numbers: Names and inventory nos.
- Retired: 1883 (one rebuilt in 1874)

Bavarian A IV engines were German 2-2-2 steam locomotives with the Royal Bavarian State Railways (Königlich Bayerische Staatsbahn).

The vehicles were developed for night journeys and operations on the North-South Railway. In order to increase the area of the evaporator, the boiler was increased in length to 3,080 mm and in diameter to 1,219 mm. In addition, the weight and the boiler overpressure were raised. These were the first engines to have an outside frame with outside cylinders. This class was used widely, especially in south Germany and in Austria. All the engines bar one were retired by 1883. The survivor was initially converted to a 0-6-0, and later a 0-4-2 wheel arrangement.

They were coupled to 3 T 5 tenders.

== See also ==
- List of Bavarian locomotives and railbuses
