= Bavarian S 3/5 =

Bavarian S 3/5 N DRG Class 17.4
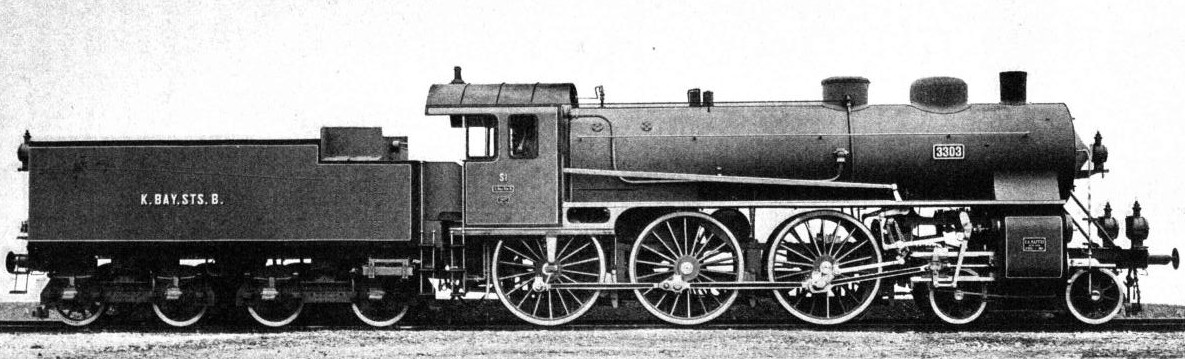
- Bavarian S 3/5 Nr. 3303
Type and origin
- Builder: Maffei
- Build date: 1903–1907
- Total produced: 39
Specifications
- Configuration
  - Whyte: 4-6-0
- Gauge: 1,435 mm (4 ft 8 1/2 in)
- Leading dia.: 950 mm (3 ft 1 3/8 in)
- Driver dia.: 1,870 mm (6 ft 1 5/8 in)
- Length
  - Over beams: 19,325 mm (63 ft 4 3/4 in)
- Axle load: 15.0 t (14.8 long tons; 16.5 short tons)
- Adhesive weight: 45.0 t (44.3 long tons; 49.6 short tons)
- Service weight: 69.8 t (68.7 long tons; 76.9 short tons)
- Water cap.: 21.0 or 21.8 m^{3} (4,600 or 4,800 imp gal; 5,500 or 5,800 US gal)
- Boiler pressure: 1st series: 14 kgf/cm^{2} (1.37 MPa; 199 psi); 2nd/3rd series: 16 kgf/cm^{2} (1.57 MPa; 228 psi)
- Heating surface
  - Firebox: 3.27 m^{2} (35.2 sq ft)
  - Evaporative: 164.43 m^{2} (1,769.9 sq ft)
- Cylinders: 4, compound
- High-pressure cylinder: 1st series: 335 mm (13 3/16 in); 2nd/3rd series: 340 mm (13 3/8 in)
- Low-pressure cylinder: 570 mm (22 7/16 in)
- Piston stroke: 640 mm (25 3/16 in)
Performance figures
- Maximum speed: 110 km/h (68 mph)
- Indicated power: 1,100 PS (809 kW; 1,080 hp)
Career
- Numbers: K.Bay.Sts.E.: 3301–3328, 3330–3340; DRG 17 401 – 17 420; CF Est 3351–3363; AL 982–986
- Retired: 1928ff.

The Class S 3/5 engines of the Royal Bavarian State Railways (Königlich Bayerische Staatsbahn) were express train steam locomotives with a 4–6–0 wheel arrangement.

== Saturated steam variant ==
Between 1903 and 1907 Maffei delivered three batches of 39 locomotives in all. They had a four-cylinder, saturated steam compound engine. Unlike their forerunners, the Bavarian Class C V, the inside high-pressure cylinders and the outside low-pressure cylinders were angled and worked on the first coupled axle.

From the second series, built in 1904, the boiler pressure of the S 3/5 was raised from 14 to 16 bar (1,400 to 1,600 kPa; 200 to 230 psi). The tube lengths and diameter of the inside cylinders were also changed.

The S 3/5 engines built from 1904 were technically closely related to the S 2/5 which was being developed in parallel. The two classes only differed in their wheel arrangement and the larger coupled wheel diameter on the S 2/5; the boiler and running gear were the same and thus also their output power. Even the permitted top speed was identical on both classes (110 km/h or 68 mph). The S 3/5 N engines were, in terms of tractive effort (300 tonnes or 295 long tons or 331 short tons at 100 km/h or 62 mph), clearly superior to the S 2/5, because they had three driven axles. S 3/5 locomotives were stabled in the locomotive workshops at Munich I and Nuremberg.

The locomotives were coupled with Bavarian 2'2' T 21 and 2'2' T 21,8 tenders.

== Superheated steam variant ==
Bavarian S 3/5 H DRG Class 17.5
Type and origin
- Builder: Maffei
- Build date: 1906–1911
- Total produced: 30
Specifications
- Configuration
  - Whyte: 4-6-0
- Axle load: 16.0 t (15.7 long tons; 17.6 short tons)
- Adhesive weight: 48.0 t (47.2 long tons; 52.9 short tons)
- Service weight: 71.9 t (70.8 long tons; 79.3 short tons)
- Superheater
  - Heating area: 33.90 m^{2} (364.9 sq ft)
- High-pressure cylinder: 360 mm (14 3/16 in)
- Low-pressure cylinder: 590 mm (23 1/4 in)
Performance figures
- Indicated power: 1,260 PS (927 kW; 1,240 hp)
Career
- Numbers: K.Bay.Sts.E.: 3329, 3341–3369; DRG: 17 501 – 17 524
- Retired: by 1948
- data shown where different

For the 1906 Bavarian State Exhibition in Nuremberg, Maffei fitted locomotive no. 3329 experimentally with a Schmidt superheater. In addition the bore of the cylinders was increased to 360 mm (14.173 in)/590 mm (23.228 in). These measures produced a significant improvement in locomotive performance (450 tonnes or 440 long tons or 500 short tons on the level at 100 km/h or 62 mph), so that from 1908 the Bavarian state railways only ordered the superheated S 3/5 H.

Although the more powerful S 3/6 express locomotive had been available since 1908, the number of S 3/5 H engines had climbed to 30 by 1911, partly because there was insufficient funding for the expensive S 3/6. As a result, the overall number of S 3/5 engines was 69.

== Reichsbahn ==
After World War I, 19 saturated steam and 6 superheated steam locomotives had to be transferred abroad. Seventeen of those went to the French Eastern Railway, five to the AL and two to the Belgian state railway. Locomotive no. 3333 was left in Poland after the war and was numbered by the PKP as Ok 103-1.

The Deutsche Reichsbahn took over the remaining 20 saturate steam engines as Class 17.4 (17 401–420) and had them converted to superheated locomotives in 1925. The remaining 24 superheated engines became Class 17.5 (17 501–524). In the meantime the S 3/5 was mainly used on passenger train duties in the Reichsbahndirektionen of Augsburg and Nuremberg, because enough modern express engines were now available.

The Reichsbahn began to retire the locomotives as early as 1932. Initially the older, former saturated steam engines disappeared, only eight examples remaining after the Second World War; whilst at the same time 21 of the former S 3/5 H locomotives were still working. All the engines were in Bavaria by the end of the war, but were heavily worn out and no longer ran in regular service. Both variants were finally retired by 1948.

== See also ==
- Royal Bavarian State Railways
- List of Bavarian locomotives and railbuses

== Sources ==
- Hütter, Ingo (2009). Die Dampflokomotiven der Baureihen 01 bis 45 der DRG, DRB, DB, und DR (in German). Werl: DGEG Medien. pp. 166–167. ISBN 978-3-937189-45-1.
- Vandenberghen, J. (1989). La guerre 1914 - 1918 et les locomotives "Armistice", 3. Description des locomotives bavaroises, saxonnes, badoises, mecklebourgeoises, oldenbourgeoises (PDF) (in French). Brussels: SNCB. p. 18.
- Weisbrod, Manfred; Müller, Hans; Petznik, Wolfgang (1976). Dampflokomotiven deutscher Eisenbahnen, Baureihe 01–39 (EFA 1.1) (in German) (3rd ed.). Düsseldorf: Alba Buchverlag. pp. 116–119. ISBN 3-87094-081-6.
- von Welser, Ludwig; Huschläger, Helge (2001). Bayern-Report. Band No. 9. Fürstenfeldbrück: Merker. ISBN 3-89610-081-5.
