= Railway divisions in Germany =

Administrative bodies for railways

In Germany and Austria, the running of railway services for a railway administration or the regional network of a large railway company was devolved to railway divisions, variously known as Eisenbahndirektionen (ED), Bundesbahndirektionen (BD) or Reichsbahndirektionen (RBD/Rbd). Their organisation was determined by the railway company concerned or by the state railway and, in the German-speaking lands at least, they formed the intermediate authorities and regional management organisations within the state railway administration's hierarchy. On the formation of the Deutsche Bahn AG in 1994 the system of railway divisions (Eisenbahndirektionen) in Germany was discontinued and their tasks were transferred to new "business areas".

== Germany ==
=== State railway divisions ===
==== Incorporation into the state government ====
The first railway divisions of the various German state railways (known as Länderbahnen), usually reported to a specific government ministry. For example, in Prussia they came under the 'Ministry for Trade, Industry and Public Works" and, from 1878, the "Ministry of Public Works" which had been split off from it. In the Kingdom of Bavaria the railway operating divisions came under the "State Ministry of Transport". By contrast the Royal Saxon State Railways reported to the Saxon finance ministry.

In Bavaria the five railway operating divisions (Eisenbahnbetriebsdirektionen) initially worked under the "General Division for Royal Transportation", in 1886 they reported to the "General Division of the Royal Bavarian State Railways" and from 1906 to the "State Ministry of Transport".

As a small state, Baden ran its railway operations from just one central headquarters and it was not until 1882 that there was a railway division in Karlsruhe. Hitherto, the responsibility for national railway construction was allocated to its Home Office and operations, by contrast, to the Foreign Office. In between times, the "Department of Waterway and Road Construction" and, later on, the "Department of Post and Railways" were responsible.

==== Internal organisation ====
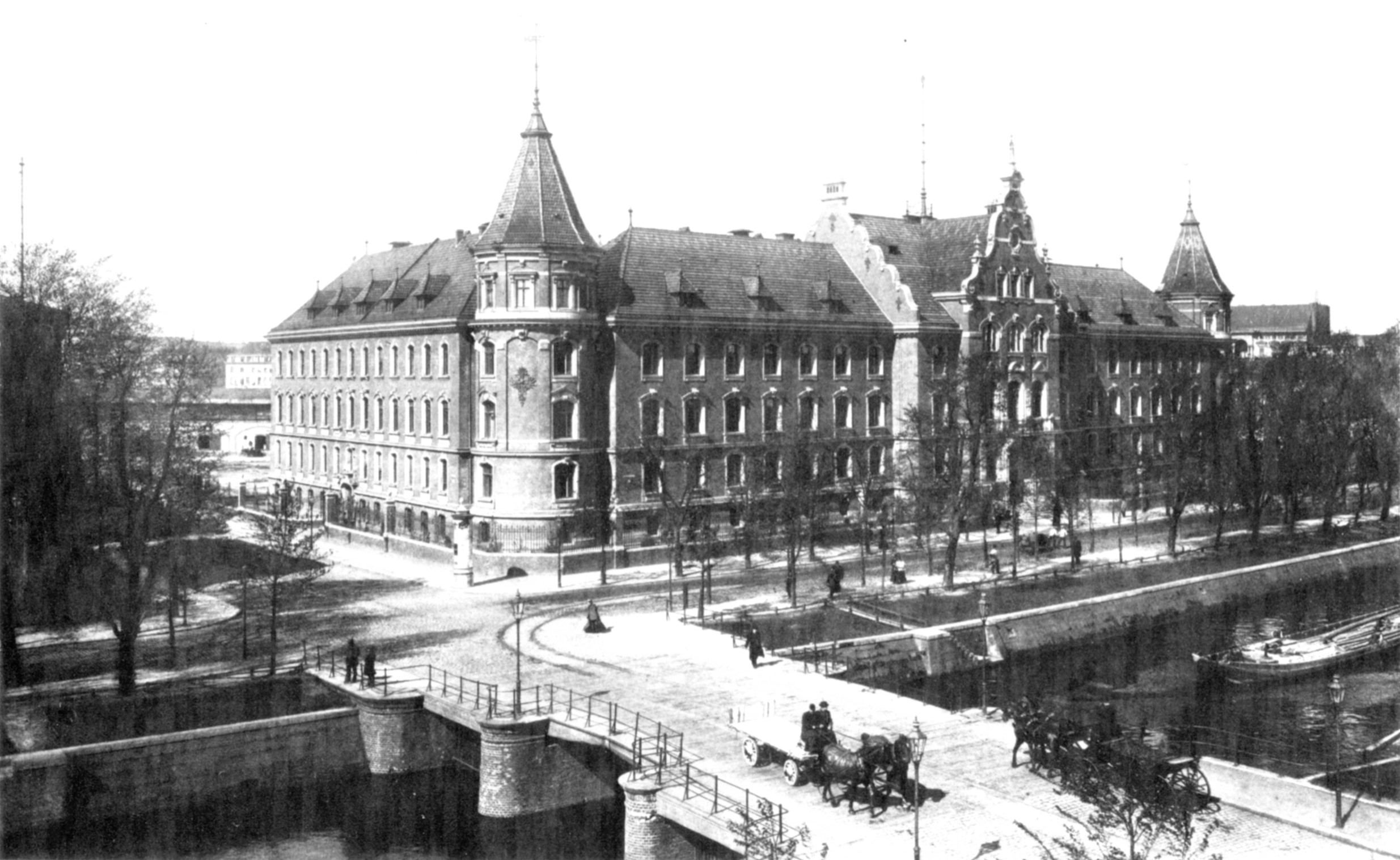
The Royal Berlin Railway Division

As the organisation of railway operations progressed, railway divisions were usually subject to state control with regard to finances. In particular this covered the fares structure (standard fare rates and special fares for specific areas), the retention or handing over of financial takings and the guarantee of additional resources to compensate for losses or for the construction of railway structures such as stations, new lines or electrification.

Within these prescribed boundaries the divisions ran the traffic operations on the routes allocated to them. Internally they frequently had departments assigned to "Finance and Staff", "Timetables, Fares and Operating Procedures" and "Construction, Maintenance and Vehicles".

==== Sub-divisions ====
Beyond that, a railway division could have several traffic operating offices, main workshops or locomotive depots at various locations, that were each allocated to specific lines. It was also sometimes the case that in a city or at a railway hub, several traffic operating offices of different railway divisions were represented next to one another, especially in the capital city of Berlin.

For example, the "Royal Berlin Division of the State Railways" was divided into eleven external "traffic operating offices" (Betriebsämter) for the routes shown:

- Three in Berlin: a) Stadtbahn and Ringbahn, b) Berlin-Sommerfeld, c) Berlin-Dresden
- Two in Breslau: a) Breslau-Sommerfeld, b) Breslau-Halbstadt
- Two in Stettin: a) Berlin-Stettin, b) Stettin-Stralsund
- One each in Görlitz, Stralsund, Kottbus and Guben

Following its restructuring on 1 April 1895 the Berlin division had:

- nine operating inspectorates (Betriebsinspektionen)
- three engineering inspectorates (Maschineninspektionen)
- thirteen workshop inspectorates (Werkstätteninspektionen)
- a telegraph inspectorate (Telegrafeninspektion) and
- four traffic inspectorates (Verkehrsinspektionen).

In addition to the president, the workforce comprised 15 members of the board, 10 assistants, an accounts director, an accounts manager and 580 office workers.

==== Prussia ====
In Prussia the administrations of the larger state railways were reorganised into independent divisions that were referred to as "Royal Railway Divisions" (Königliche Eisenbahndirektionen or KED for short. Later they were simply called railway divisions (Eisenbahndirektionen or ED) within the Prussian state railways. Prussia's vast railway network had the largest number of railway divisions and they had widely differing structures. The railway divisions reported directly to the Ministry for Trade, Industry and Public Works until 1878, when it was broken up and the divisions reported to the newly formed Ministry for Public Works. In addition to the railways, it was responsible for the construction of canals and country roads, thus it was a sort of transport ministry.

===== Divisions =====
As at 1907, after the management reform of 1895 and its merger with the Hessian State Railways, the Prussian state railways had the following divisions:

Date founded	Location	Remarks
5 November 1849	Bromberg	As "Royal Division of the Ostbahn at Bromberg"
1 January 1852	Berlin	As the former "Royal Division of the Lower Silesia-Mark railway"
1 April 1880	Cöln linksrheinisch (i.e. 'Cologne west of the Rhine'), Frankfurt, Hannover, Magdeburg	
1 May 1882	Erfurt	
1 January 1883	Kattowitz	Disbanded in October 1921
1 March 1884	Altona	
1 April 1895	Breslau, Cassel, Danzig, Elberfeld, Essen, Halle (Saale), Königsberg, Münster, Posen, Saarbrücken, Stettin	
1 February 1897	Mainz	As "Division of the Royal Prussian and Grand Duchy of Hesse State Railways"
1 April 1907	Royal Railway Head Office, Berlin	Ranked as a KED

The divisions created as a result of the restructuring of 1895 in Prussia were, in the main, adopted by their successor administrations: the Deutsche Reichsbahn-Gesellschaft, the Deutsche Bundesbahn and the Deutsche Reichsbahn in East Germany.

==== Bavaria ====
The state-run regional administrations which formed part of the Royal Bavarian State Railways were initially referred to as "railway offices" (Bahnämter) and "main railway offices" (Oberbahnämter). The latter were located in Augsburg, Bamberg, Ingolstadt, Kempten, Munich, Nuremberg, Regensburg, Rosenheim, Weiden and Würzburg. Until 1886, they were subordinated to the "General Division of Royal Transportation" (Generaldirektion der königlichen Verkehrsanstalten) and from 1886 to 1906 to the "General Division of the Royal Bavarian State Railways" (Generaldirektion der königlich bayerischen Staatseisenbahnen). From 1906 'railway operating divisions' (Eisenbahnbetriebsdirektionen) were created, that reported to the "State Ministry for Transport" (Staatsministerium für Verkehrsangelegenheiten). They included the divisions of Augsburg, Ludwigshafen/Rhine, Munich, Nuremberg, Bamberg, Regensburg and Würzburg, that, apart from Bamberg (which became part of Nuremberg) were taken over by the Reichsbahn in 1920.

==== Saxony ====
In Saxony there were initially several organisationally separate "state railways", based in Dresden, in Leipzig and briefly it would seem in Chemnitz.

On 1 August 1848 the "Royal Division of the Saxon-Bohemian State Railway" (Königliche Direction der Sächsisch-Böhmischen Staatseisenbahn) was founded. Shortly afterwards it was retitled to the "Royal Division of the Saxon-Bohemian and Saxon-Silesian State Railways" (Königlichen Direction der Sächsisch-Böhmischen und Sächsisch-Schlesischen Staatseisenbahnen), from 14 December 1852 to the "Royal State Railway Division" (Königlichen Staatseisenbahn-Direction), from 1 October 1853 to the "Royal Division of the Eastern State Railways" (Königliche Direktion der östlichen Staatseisenbahnen) and finally on 1 July 1869 it was combined with the Leipzig division to become the "Royal General Division of the Saxon State Railways" (Königlichen Generaldirection der sächsischen Staatseisenbahnen).

On 1 April 1847 in Leipzig the "Royal Division of the Saxon-Bavarian State Railway" (Königliche Direction der Sächsisch-Bayerischen Staatseisenbahn) was founded; on 1 October 1853 it became the "Royal Division of the Western State Railway" (Königlichen Direktion der westlichen Staatseisenbahn). It was disbanded on 1 July 1869 and merged with Dresden.

==== Other state railways ====
The other state railway divisions were:

- Hesse:
  - The "Grand Duchy Division of the Upper Hessian State Railway" in Giessen
  - The "Main-Neckarbahn Division" in Darmstadt.
- Württemberg: "Railway Division of the Württemberg state railways" in Stuttgart
- Baden: "General Division of the Grand Duchy of Baden State Railways" in Karlsruhe
- Oldenburg: "Grand Duchy railway division" in Oldenburg.
- Alsace-Lorraine: "Imperial General Division of the railways in Alsace-Lorraine" at Strasbourg, for the railway in Alsace-Lorraine and the Wilhelm-Luxemburg railway.
- Mecklenburg: "Grand Ducal General Railway Division" (GGED) in Schwerin (from 1889)

=== Deutsche Reichsbahn ===
In 1920 the successor to all the German state railways, the Deutsche Reichsbahn was founded and, in 1924 the Deutsche Reichsbahn-Gesellschaft (to 1945/1949) took over most of the divisions of the German Länderbahnen, which then acted as intermediate authorities within the Reichsbahn structure. During the 1930s, a few of the smaller Reichsbahn divisions were allocated to larger divisions or split between several divisions.

The Reichsbahn divisions (Reichsbahndirektionen, RBD or Rbd) were responsible for traffic operations, locomotive running and all specialist functions that were not reserved by the Ministry, by a senior management department (Oberbetriebsleitung, later Generalbetriebsleitung), a central office or special "lead divisions". In the case of the latter, the specific functions of several RBDs were carried out by one of them. These were primarily workshop functions (especially those of the Reichsbahn repair shops, the Reichsbahnausbesserungswerke, which counted as "offices"), i. e. these lead divisions commanded and oversaw the activities of all workshops in the repair shops of its area of business, the remaining, local RBDs having nothing to do with those workshops.

Each RBD was usually divided into five specialist departments, that corresponded to the railway departments of the Reich Transport Ministry and the Deutsche Reichsbahn-Gesellschaft.

==== Reichsbahn divisions ====
The individual divisions were given identification letters. Even the abbreviations of stations and other operating points within the division began with the divisional letter as recorded in the Reichsbahn's official list of railway operating points (DV100/DS100).

In 1927, the Deutsche Reichsbahn-Gesellschaft was divided into 24 Reichsbahn divisions, to which were added the six, initially separate, divisions of the Bavarian Group Administration (Gruppenverwaltung Bayern) and two divisions from the wider German-speaking world:

- A Reichsbahndirektion Altona (later Hamburg)
- B Reichsbahndirektion Berlin
- Reichsbahndirektion Breslau
- D Reichsbahndirektion Dresden
- Reichsbahndirektion Elberfeld (later Wuppertal)
- U Reichsbahndirektion Erfurt
- E Reichsbahndirektion Essen/Ruhr
- F Reichsbahndirektion Frankfurt/Main
- L Reichsbahndirektion Halle (Saale)
- H Reichsbahndirektion Hannover
- R Reichsbahndirektion Karlsruhe
- Reichsbahndirektion Kassel
- K Reichsbahndirektion Köln
- Reichsbahndirektion Königsberg (Pr.)
- Reichsbahndirektion Magdeburg (disbanded on 1 October 1931, to RBD Halle/Saale, Berlin, Altona and Hannover), but see below!
- Reichsbahndirektion Mainz
- Reichsbahndirektion Münster (Westf.)
- Reichsbahndirektion Oldenburg (dissolved on 1 January 1935, to RBD Münster and Hannover)
- Reichsbahndirektion Oppeln
- Reichsbahndirektion Osten (in Frankfurt/Oder)
- W Reichsbahndirektion Schwerin
- Reichsbahndirektion Stettin
- T Reichsbahndirektion Stuttgart
- S Reichsbahndirektion Trier (from 1935 RBD Saarbrücken)

The Bavarian Group Administration (dissolved at the end of 1933) of the Deutsche Reichsbahn included the:

- Reichsbahndirektion Augsburg
- Reichsbahndirektion Ludwigshafen/Rhein (dissolved on 1 April 1937, to RBDs Mainz und Saarbrücken)
- M Reichsbahndirektion München
- N Reichsbahndirektion Nürnberg
- Reichsbahndirektion Regensburg
- Reichsbahndirektion Würzburg (dissolved on 1 January 1931, to RBD Nuremberg)

The railway lines of the Sudetenland were allocated to the neighbouring railway divisions of Breslau, Dresden and Regensburg. In 1939, after the annexation of former German imperial and Polish territories into the German Reich, two new Reichsbahn divisions were formed:

- Reichsbahndirektion Danzig for the Reichsgau of Danzig-West Prussia
- Reichsbahndirektion Posen for the Reichsgau of Wartheland

=== Deutsche Reichsbahn in the GDR (East Germany) ===
The Deutsche Reichsbahn in East Germany after the war added four more divisions to those on its national territory taken over from its predecessor organisation. These took over the responsibility formerly discharged by the divisions in the former eastern territories and by those now in the Federal Republic of Germany, keeping the identification letters. The Deutsche Reichsbahn in the GDR continued to refer to them as "Reichsbahn divisions" until its merger into the Deutsche Bahn AG in 1994.

Each Reichsbahn division was headed by a President, who reported to the Ministry of Transport. The Reichsbahn division was subordinated to a Reichsbahn office, local departments to the main functional branches of engineering, wagon maintenance, railway infrastructure, safety and communications, and departments with special tasks to the district. The Reichsbahn division itself was split into groups, run by a group head, and into functional departments (e.g. planning, personnel and training, ledger keeping and statistics). The boundaries of the Reichsbahn divisions took account of the railway network and the territorial structure of the GDR.

==== GDR Reichsbahn divisions ====
List of divisions in the Reichsbahn in East Germany:

- Reichsbahndirektion Berlin
- Reichsbahndirektion Cottbus (from 1 October 1945 for RBD Osten)
- Reichsbahndirektion Dresden
- Reichsbahndirektion Erfurt
- Reichsbahndirektion Greifswald (from 10 October 1945 for RBD Stettin)
- Reichsbahndirektion Halle
- H Reichsbahndirektion Magdeburg (from 18 August 1945 for RBD Hannover)
- Reichsbahndirektion Schwerin
- Reichsbahndirektion Wittenberge (from 15 August to 30 September 1945 replaced RBD Hamburg)

=== Deutsche Bundesbahn ===
On the creation of the Deutsche Bundesbahn the former Reichsbahndirektionen were renamed Bundesbahndirektionen (federal railway divisions). Their area of operations was broadly the same as the former Reichsbahn divisions with the exception of areas which lay in the GDR and the eastern European countries.

Following the law creating the Bundesbahn the railway divisions were subordinated to the 20-strong governing body of the Bundesbahn, whose members were selected by the federal government. According to the Bundesbahn law, the governing body decided on the presidents of the railway divisions in agreement with the board, as well as the establishment, transfer, dissolution or significant organisational changes to a railway division or a central office of the Deutsche Bundesbahn and any major changes to its districts. The law also specified that organisational changes had to be carried out with the agreement of the state authorities affected. The final authority was the Federal Minister of Transport.

==== Bundesbahn divisions ====
In 1993 the Deutsche Bundesbahn was divided into the following divisions (in brackets the identification numbers of the traffic operating departments, the construction and engineering departments had this number plus 50):

- Bundesbahndirektion Hamburg [01]
- Bundesbahndirektion Hannover [13]
- Bundesbahndirektion Essen [10]
- Bundesbahndirektion Köln [15]
- Bundesbahndirektion Frankfurt [11]
- Bundesbahndirektion Saarbrücken [25]
- Bundesbahndirektion Karlsruhe [14]
- Bundesbahndirektion Stuttgart [29]
- Bundesbahndirektion Nürnberg [22]
- Bundesbahndirektion München [20]

At that time the following divisions had been dissolved and absorbed by other remaining divisions:

- Bundesbahndirektion Trier (dissolved by January 1960, to BD Saarbrücken after reunification of the Saarland with Germany)
- Bundesbahndirektion Augsburg (dissolved on 1 Juni 1971, to BD München) [02]
- Bundesbahndirektion Mainz (dissolved on 30 April 1972, to BDs Saarbrücken, Karlsruhe, Frankfurt, Wuppertal and Köln)[19]
- Bundesbahndirektion Münster (dissolved on 31 December 1974, to BDs Essen and Hannover) [21]
- Bundesbahndirektion Wuppertal (dissolved on 31 December 1974, to BDs Köln and Essen) [08]
- Bundesbahndirektion Kassel (dissolved on 31 December 1974, to BD Frankfurt) [05]
- Bundesbahndirektion Regensburg (dissolved on 1 June 1976, to BDs München and Nürnberg) [26]

In addition there were departments like the Bundesbahn central offices in Munich and Minden (Westf.) and other central departments, whose ambit covered several divisions.

On the creation of Deutsche Bahn AG in 1994 all the divisions were scrapped and their tasks transferred to new business areas.

=== Tabular overview ===
In the following table all the former German railway divisions are listed, together with their affiliations over time. For some of the railway divisions in this table earlier formation dates are given; these are usually the divisions of the former private railway companies.

Legend
Time periods:
1 = Länderbahnen to 1866 (In 1866 several states were annexed by Prussia)
2 = Länderbahnen 1866–1895 (In 1895 there was a management reform in the Prussian state railways)
3 = Länderbahnen 1895–1920 (In 1920 the Länderbahnen were taken over by the Deutsche Reichsbahn)
4 = Deutsche Reichsbahn (Gesellschaft) 1920–1945/49 (In 1945/49 Germany was divided)
5 = Deutsche Bundesbahn/Deutsche Reichsbahn (GDR) 1949–1994 (In 1991–1994 the DB and DR merged into the Deutsche Bahn AG)

Länderbahn abbreviations:

- Bad = Grand Duchy of Baden State Railways
- Bay = Royal Bavarian State Railways
- Bra = Duchy of Brunswick State Railway (from 1870 part of the Prussian state railways)
- D-H = Danish-Holstein (King Christian VIII Baltic Sea Railway)
- GOE = Grand Duchy of Oldenburg State Railways (G.O.E., 1867–1920)
- Hann = Royal Hanoverian State Railways (from 1866 part of the Prussian state railways)
- Kurh = Bebra-Hanau railway (Kurhessian State Railway) (from 1866 part of the Prussian state railways)
- MFF = Grand Duchy of Mecklenburg Friedrich-Franz Railway
- Nas = Nassau State Railway (from 1866 part of the Prussian state railways)
- Pr = Prussian state railways
- Sä = Royal Saxon State Railways
- Wü = Royal Württemberg State Railways
- DB = Deutsche Bundesbahn
- DR = Deutsche Reichsbahn
- DRG = Deutsche Reichsbahn-Gesellschaft

Railway divisions
1	2	3	4	5	Location	Founded	Remarks
Eastern Germany
Pr	Pr	Pr	DR	–	Bromberg	5 November 1849	Formerly "Royal Division of the Ostbahn at Bromberg"
–	Pr	Pr	DR	–	Kattowitz	1 January 1883	
–	–	Pr	DR	–	Breslau	1 April 1895	–
–	–	Pr	DR	–	Danzig	1 April 1895	–
–	–	Pr	DR	–	Königsberg	1 April 1895	–
–	–	Pr	DR	–	Posen	1 April 1895	–
–	–	Pr	DR	–	Stettin	1 April 1895	–
–	–	–	DR	–	Oppeln		–
–	–	–	DR	–	Osten / Frankfurt O.		–
Central Germany
Pr	Pr	Pr	DR	DR	Berlin	1 January 1852	Formerly "Royal Division of the Lower Saxony-Mark Railway"
–	Pr	Pr	–	–	Berlin	15 October 1875	Royal Division of the Military Railway
–	Pr	Pr	–	–	Berlin	15 July 1878	"Royal Division of the Berline City Railway", disbanded 1882
–	–	Pr	??	??	Berlin	1 April 1907	Royal Railway Central Office, ranked as a KED
–	Pr	Pr	DR	DR	Magdeburg	1 April 1880	Dissolved on 1 October 1931, to RBD Halle/Saale, Berlin, Altona and Hannover; from 18 August 1945 reformed again for the former RBD Hannover
–	Pr	Pr	DR	DR	Erfurt	1 Mai 1882	–
–	–	Pr	DR	DR	Halle (Saale)	1 April 1895	–
Sä	Sä	Sä	DR	DR	Dresden	1 August 1848	From 1 July 1869 merged with Leipzig into the "Royal General Division of the Saxon State Railways"
Sä	Sä	Sä	–	–	Leipzig	1 April 1847	Royal Division of the Saxon-Bavarian State Railway, dissolved on 1 July 1869 and merged with Dresden
Sä	–	–	–	–	Chemnitz?	1 October 1853	"Royal Division of the Chemnitzer-Riesa State Railway", dissolved again in 1858 and absorbed by the Leipzig division
	MFFE	MFFE	DR	DR	Schwerin	1873	Formerly "Grand Ducal Railway Division in Schwerin", previously in Malchin
–	–	–	–	DR	Cottbus	1 October 1945	Took over from RBD Osten
–	–	–	–	DR	Greifswald	10 Oktober 1945	Took over from RBD Stettin
–	–	–	–	DR	Wittenberge	15 August	To 30 September 1945 as replacement for RBD Hamburg
Northwestern Germany
D-H	Pr	Pr	DR	DB	Altona	1 January 1887	–
Br	Br	–	–	–	Braunschweig	1 December 1838	Royal Division of the Brunswick Railways, dissolved 1869, absorbed by the Prussian division of Magdeburg
–	Pr	Pr	–	–	Cöln rechtsrhein.	1 April 1880	Formerly "Royal Division of the Cologne-Minden Railway at Cologne"; dissolved 1 April 1895, transferred to Cöln linksrheinisch
–	Pr	Pr	DR	DB	Cöln linksrhein.	1 April 1880	Formerly "Royal Division of the Rhine Railway at Cologne"; merged on 1 April 1895 into KED Cöln
–	–	Pr	DR	DB	Cassel	1 April 1895	Dissolved on 31 December 1974, to BD Frankfurt
–	–	Pr	DR	DB	Elberfeld / Wuppertal	14 September 1850	Formerly "Royal Division of the Bergisch-Mark Railway Company"; dissolved on 31 December 1974, to BDs Cologne and Essen
–	–	Pr	DR	DB	Essen	1 April 1895	–
Hann	Pr	Pr	DR	DB	Hannover	13 March 1843	Previously "Royal Hanoverian Railway Division"
–	–	Pr	DR	DB	Münster	1 April 1895	Dissolved on 31 December 1974, to BDs Essen and Hannover
–	–	Pr	DR	DB	Saarbrücken / Trier	1 April 1895	No successor to the Saarbrück Railway Division from 22 May 1852
–	–	Pr	DR	DB	Mainz	1 February 1897	Royal Prussian and Grand Duchy of Hesse ED dissolved on 30 April 1972, to BDs Karlsruhe, Frankfurt and Cologne
??	Pr	Pr	DR	DB	Frankfurt (M)	1. April 1880	–
Nas	Pr	–	–	–	Wiesbaden	1853	Dissolved 1 April 1880, to Frankfurt
–	GOE	GOE	DR	–	Oldenburg	1. April 1867	"Grand Duchy of Oldenburg Railway Division", dissolved on 1 January 1935, to RBD Münster and Hanover
Southern Germany
–	–	Bay	DR	DB	Augsburg	1907	1845: "railway office" (Bahnamt); 1845: "main railway office" (Oberbahnamt) from 1876 dissolved on 1 June 1971, to BD München
–	–	Bay	DR	DB	Bamberg	1902	1845: "railway office" (Bahnamt); 1876: "main railway office" (Oberbahnamt), dissolved in 1920, placed under RBD Nuremberg
–	–	Bay	DR	–	Ludwigshafen/Rhein	–	(dissolved on 1 April 1937, to RBDs Mainz and Saarbrücken)
Bay	Bay	Bay	DR	DB	München	1851	Initially "General Division of Royal Transportation" and "General Division of the Royal Bavarian State Railways"
–	–	Bay	DR	DB	Nürnberg	??	–
–	–	Bay	DR	DB	Regensburg	??	Dissolved on 1 June 1976, to BDs Munich and Nuremberg
–	–	Bay	DR	–	Würzburg	??	Dissolved on 1 January 1931, to RBD Nuremberg
??	??	Wü	DR	DB	Stuttgart	??	–
–	Bad	Bad	DR	DB	Karlsruhe	1872	The state railways were formerly subordinated to the "Main Division for Waterway and Road Construction" and, later, the "Main Division for Post and Railways".

== Austria ==
=== Former Austro-Hungary ===
The organisation in Austria dates from a decree of 24 February 1882. According to that a "Royal Imperial Division for State Railway Operations" in Vienna was subordinated to the Trade Ministry and was assigned a state railway governing body. Below that were main railway operating offices (Oberbahnbetriebsämter) which were made responsible for overseeing the traffic operations, construction, railway maintenance and train services within a given district.

In Hungary, central management of operations was in the hands of a division in Pest with a director at its head, who had sub-directors appointed to run the various functional branches. The latter exercised a degree of independence of management within their area of business and acted on the board of directors as experts in their own right. Operations, construction, track maintenance and train services for the various operating districts (of 150–600 km in size) were entrusted to operating and traffic managers (like the railway operating offices in Prussia).

=== Annexed Austria ===
After the annexation of Austria in 1938 into the German Reich the territory operated by the BBÖ was allocated to the following Reichsbahn divisions:

- Reichsbahndirektion Linz
- Reichsbahndirektion Villach
- Reichsbahndirektion Wien

=== Austria ===
- Eisenbahndirektion Wien / from August 1945 "General Division of the Austrian State Railways" (ÖstB), later "General Division of the Austrian Federal Railways" (ÖBB) and "Bundesbahndirektion" (federal division).
- Eisenbahndirektion Linz, later "Bundesbahndirektion"
- Eisenbahndirektion Villach, later "Bundesbahndirektion"
- Eisenbahndirektion Innsbruck, later "Bundesbahndirektion"

== Poland ==
=== German Ostbahn ===
After the invasion of Poland the Deutsche Reichsbahn (DRB) organised the railway routes in the so-called Generalgouvernement on 1 November 1939 into the "General Division of the Eastern Railway" (Generaldirektion der Ostbahn) (GEDOB) with its headquarters in Kraków (Krakau). The majority of the staff of the Deutsche Ostbahn came from Germany; Polish citizens were only permitted to be employed in the lower ranks. The rolling stock on the Ostbahn came from the former Polish State Railways (PKP).

- Generaldirektion der Ostbahn
  - Präsident Adolf Gerteis

== Literature ==
- Hansjürgen Wenzel: Kriegsende und Eisenbahnorganisation, in: Eisenbahn-Kurier 5/95, S. 44–49.
- Michael Reimer, Volkmar Kubitzki: Eisenbahn in Polen 1939–1945 – Die Geschichte der Generaldirektion der Ostbahn. ISBN 3-613-71213-X

== See also ==
- History of rail transport in Germany
