= Bavarian C V =

German express train locomotive (1899–1901)

Bavarian C V DRG Class 17.3
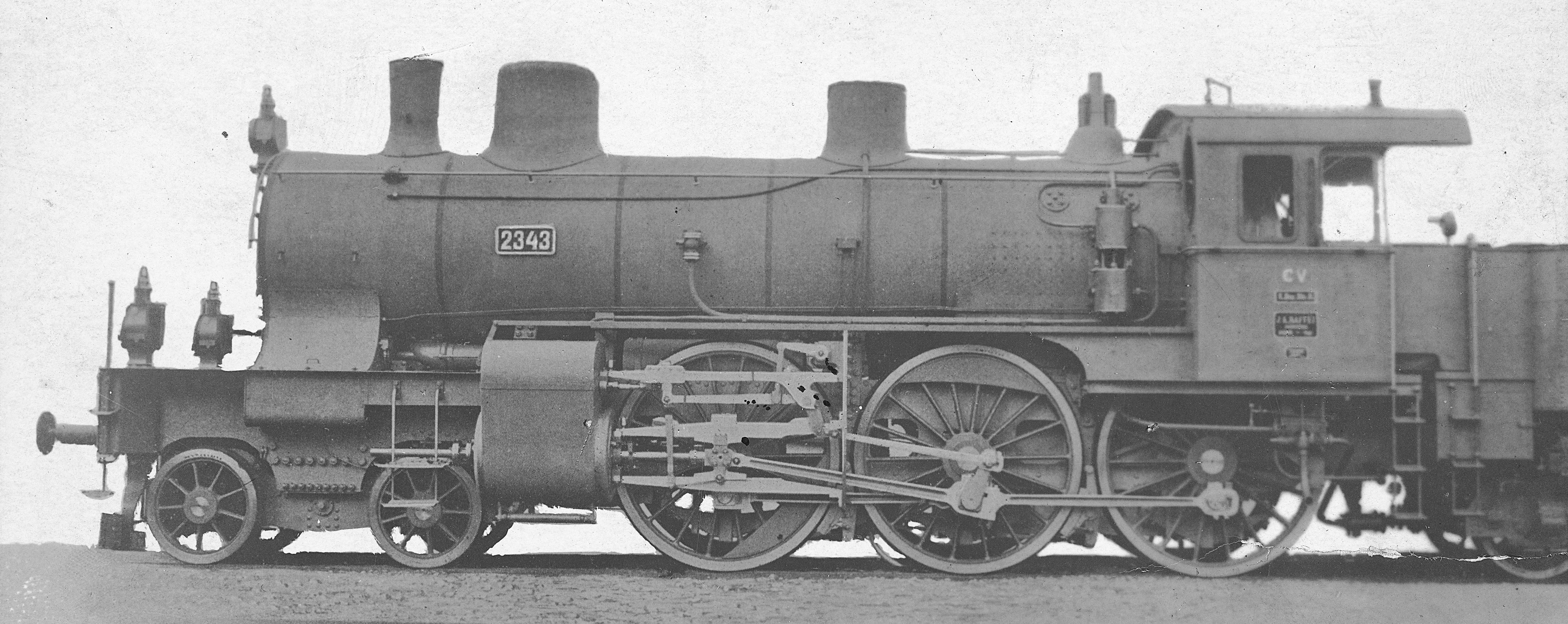
Type and origin
- Builder: Maffei
- Build date: Prototype: 1896; Production: 1899–1901
- Total produced: Prototype: 1; Production: 42
Specifications
- Configuration
  - Whyte: 4-6-0
- Gauge: 1,435 mm (4 ft 8 1/2 in)
- Leading dia.: 950 mm (3 ft 1 3/8 in)
- Driver dia.: Prototype: 1,640 mm (5 ft 4 5/8 in); Production: 1,870 mm (6 ft 1 5/8 in)
- Length
  - Over beams: 18,840 mm (61 ft 9 3/4 in)
- Axle load: 15.4 t (15.2 long tons; 17.0 short tons)
- Adhesive weight: 46.2 t (45.5 long tons; 50.9 short tons)
- Service weight: 66.2 t (65.2 long tons; 73.0 short tons)
- Water cap.: 21.5 m^{3} (4,700 imp gal; 5,700 US gal)
- Boiler pressure: 14 kgf/cm^{2} (199 lbf/in^{2})
- Heating surface
  - Firebox: 2.65 m^{2} (28.5 sq ft)
  - Evaporative: 153.00 m^{2} (1,646.9 sq ft)
- Cylinders: 2, compound
- High-pressure cylinder: 380 mm (14 15/16 in)
- Low-pressure cylinder: 610 mm (24 in)
- Piston stroke: 640 mm (25 3/16 in)
Performance figures
- Maximum speed: 90 km/h (56 mph)
- Indicated power: 1,200 PS (883 kW; 1,180 hp)
Career
- Numbers: K.Bay.Sts.E.: 2301–2343; DRG: 17 301 – 17 322
- Retired: by 1930

The Class C V (pronounced C 5) of the Royal Bavarian State Railways (Königlich Bayerische Staatsbahn) was one of the first European express train locomotives with a 4-6-0 wheel arrangement.

In 1896 Maffei built a steam locomotive for the Bavarian state exhibition at their own expense. It had coupled wheels with a 1,640 mm diameter and was therefore regarded as a multi-purpose locomotive. After the exhibition the Bavarian State Railway purchased this locomotive and, after thorough testing, ordered more engines of this type, albeit in a stronger version and with a 1,870 mm coupled wheel diameter, i.e. as genuine express train locomotives. Between 1899 and 1901 Maffei supplied 42 examples.

The C V had a four-cylinder de Glehn compound engine. Its low-pressure cylinders were external, operating on the second coupled axle, and were located between the bogie and the first coupled axle. The high-pressure cylinders were internal and worked the first coupled axle. The engines still lacked a superheater. In terms of its power (160 tons at top speed), the C V could only be used for a few years in heavy express train services. As early as 1903 the locomotives were relegated to secondary duties, but even there they did not stay long.

17 machines had to be given to France after World War I. The Deutsche Reichsbahn took over the remaining 22 examples as the DRG Class 17.3 with numbers 17 301 to 17 322. They were retired by 1930.

The vehicles were equipped with Bavarian 2'2' T 21,5 tenders.

== See also ==
- Royal Bavarian State Railways
- List of Bavarian locomotives and railbuses

== Literature ==
- Hütter, Ingo (2009). Die Dampflokomotiven der Baureihen 01 bis 45 der DRG, DRB, DB, und DR (in German). Werl: DGEG Medien. pp. 162–163. ISBN 978-3-937189-45-1.
- Obermayer, Horst J. (1970). Taschenbuch Deutsche Dampflokomotiven. Regelspur (in German) (2nd ed.). Stuttgart: Franckh'sche Verlagshandlung. p. 56. ISBN 3-440-03643-X.
- Weisbrod, Manfred; Müller, Hans; Petznik, Wolfgang (1976). Dampflokomotiven deutscher Eisenbahnen, Baureihe 01–39 (EFA 1.1) (in German) (3rd ed.). Düsseldorf: Alba Buchverlag. pp. 115–116. ISBN 3-87094-081-6.
