= Reichsbahndirektion Regensburg =

Reichsbahndirektion Regensburg (RBD Regensburg) was a Deutsche Reichsbahn railway division within the Bavarian Group Administration in southern Germany with its headquarters at Regensburg, Bavaria.

The area covered by this division included the Bavarian provinces of Lower Bavaria and Upper Palatinate and extended into eastern Upper Franconia around Hof.

== Important railway routes within the division ==
- (Munich) – Landshut – Plattling – Bayerisch Eisenstein – (Pilsen)
- (Munich) – Landshut – Regensburg – Weiden in der Oberpfalz – Landkreis Hof
- (Neumarkt in der Oberpfalz) – Regensburg – Plattling – Passau – (Linz)
- (Nuremberg) – Amberg – Schwandorf – Furth im Wald – (Pilsen)
- (Nuremberg) – Marktredwitz – Eger (Bohemia)

== Sources ==
- Amtlicher Taschenfahrplan der Reichsbahndirektion Regensburg 1943, Gültig vom 1. November 1943 an - Reichsbahndirektion Regensburg, Verlag Rockstuhl, Bad Langensalza, 1. Reprint-Auflage 2007, ISBN 978-3-937135-80-9
