= Upper Hessian Railway Company =

Transport company in Germany

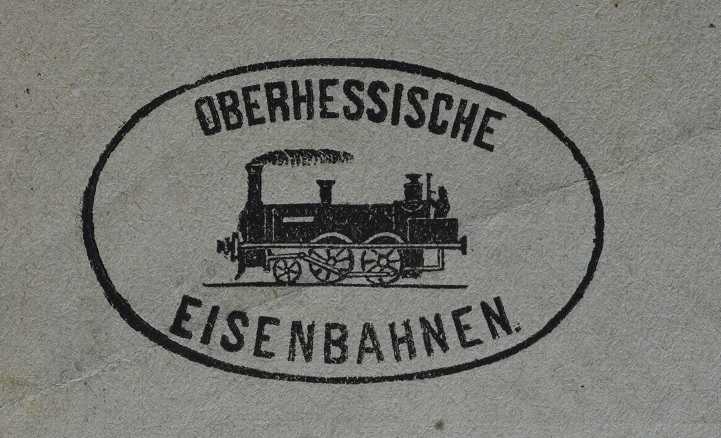
A stamp of the company logo

The Upper Hessian Railway Company (Oberhessische Eisenbahn-Gesellschaft) was a private concern whose aim was to build and run railway lines in the province of Upper Hesse in the Grand Duchy of Hesse, a state within the German Empire in the 19th and early 20th centuries.

Whilst the Main-Weser railway had linked Wetterau, a town in the western part of the province of Upper Hesse, to the new mode of transport as early as 1850–1852, much of the area, around the Vogelsberg, remained without any railway connexions for years. Not until 1868/69 was the Upper Hessian Railway Company founded with assistance from the Frankfurt banking house, Erlanger & Söhne, and with the financial support of the state of Hesse.

It contracted a Belgian company to build routes from the railway hub of Giessen to Gelnhausen (Lahn–Kinzig Railway) and Fulda (Vogelsberg Railway). On 29 December 1869 services were opened from Giessen to Hungen, on 29 June 1870 to Nidda and on 30 October 1870 to Büdingen. The entire route of the Lahn-Kinzig Railway to Gelnhausen, that comprised a link line of 70 km length along the western perimeter of the Vogelsberg to the Kinzig Valley Railway, was completed on 30 November 1870.

The 106 km long link from Giessen to Fulda ran through the northern foothills of the Vogelsberg, the first section of which was opened to traffic as far as Grünberg on 29 December 1869. But further construction on the railway was delayed by the Franco-Prussian War so that Alsfeld was not reached until 29 July 1870, Lauterbach until 30 October 1870 and Bad Salzschlirf by the end of the same year. The remainder of the Vogelsberg Railway was not completed until 31 July 1871. Twenty-eight kilometres of the two routes lay in Prussian territory.

The demand for services turned out to be below expectations for both passenger and goods traffic. As a result, the company reached an agreement with the Grand Duchy of Hesse whereby the state became the owner of the railway from 1 January 1876. The state set up a railway division for the Upper Hessian Railways in the provincial capital of Giessen. This formed the cornerstone for the subsequent Grand Duchy of Hesse State Railways.

== Literature ==
- Arthur von Mayer: Geschichte und Geographie der Deutschen Eisenbahnen, Berlin 1894

== See also ==
- Grand Duchy of Hesse
- Grand Duchy of Hesse State Railways
- History of rail transport in Germany
- Prussian state railways
