= Royal Bavarian State Railways =

Former transport company

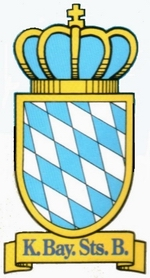
Coat of arms of the Royal Bavarian State Railways

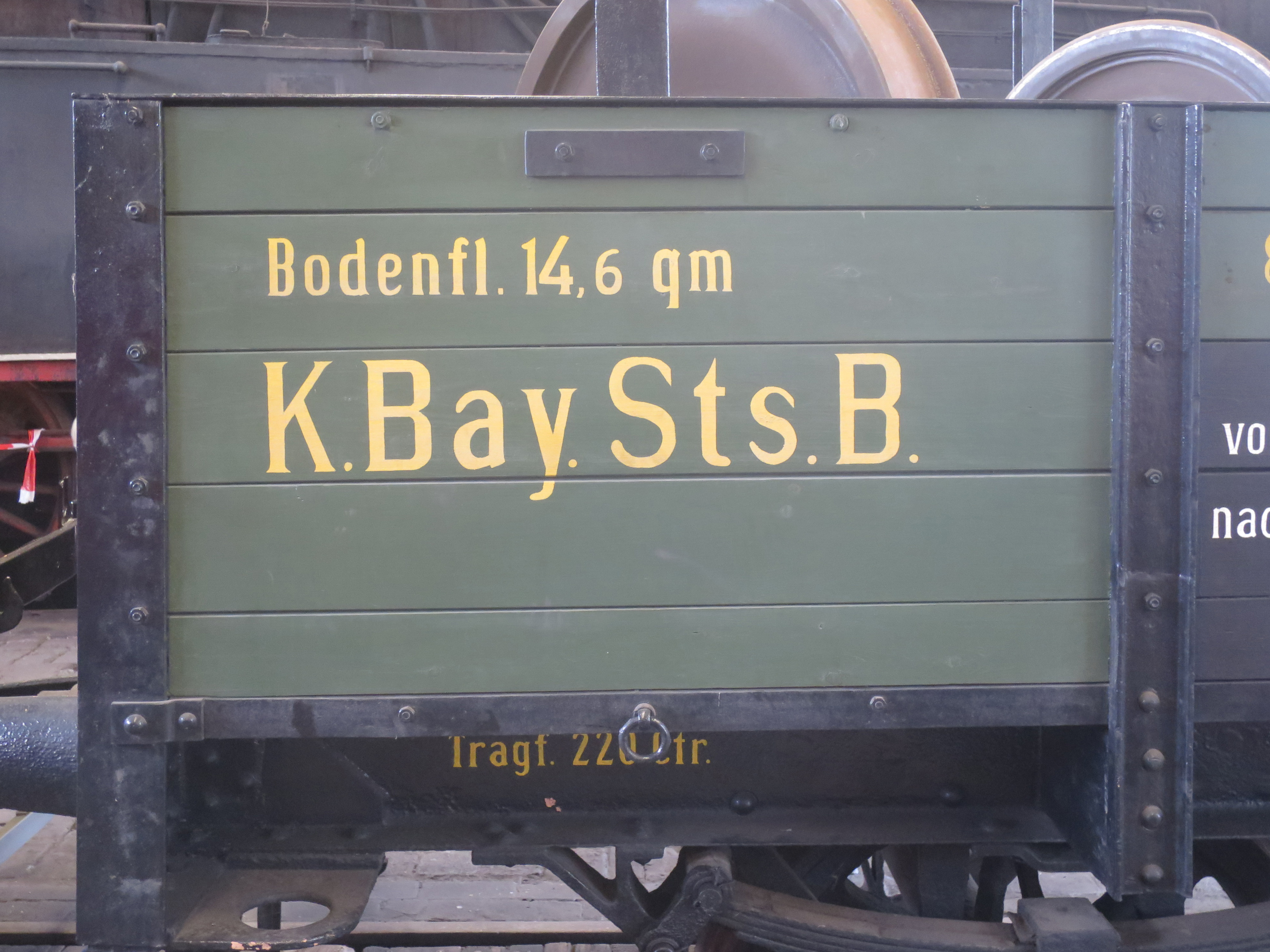
Owner's inscription on a goods wagon

The Royal Bavarian State Railways (Königliche Bayerische Staats-Eisenbahnen or K.Bay.Sts.B.) was the state railway company for the Kingdom of Bavaria. It was founded in 1844. The organisation grew into the second largest of the German state railways (after that of the Prussian state railways) with a railway network of 8,526 kilometres (including the Palatinate Railway or Pfalzbahn) by the end of the First World War.

Following the abdication of the Bavarian monarchy at the end of the First World War, the 'Royal' title was dropped and on 24 April 1920 the Bavarian State Railway (Bayerische Staatseisenbahn), as it was then called, was merged into the newly formed German Reich Railways Authority or Deutsche Reichseisenbahnen as the Bavarian Group Administration (Gruppenverwaltung Bayern). The management of the Bavarian railway network was divided into four Reichsbahn divisions: Augsburg, Munich, Nuremberg and Regensburg. The former Palatinate Railway formed the Ludwigshafen division. On 1 October 1933 the only group administration within the Deutsche Reichsbahn-Gesellschaft, the Gruppenverwaltung Bayern, was disbanded.

As a nation-state, Germany did not come into being until the creation of the German Empire in 1871 from the various German-speaking states, such as Prussia, Bavaria, Saxony, Baden and Württemberg. By then each of the major states had formed its own state railway, and these remained separate, albeit working increasingly closely together, until after the First World War. After 1815, the territory of Bavaria included the Palatinate, or Pfalz, which was west of the Rhine and bordered on France and became part of the newly formed German state of Rhineland-Palatinate in 1946.

== The three Bavarian main lines ==
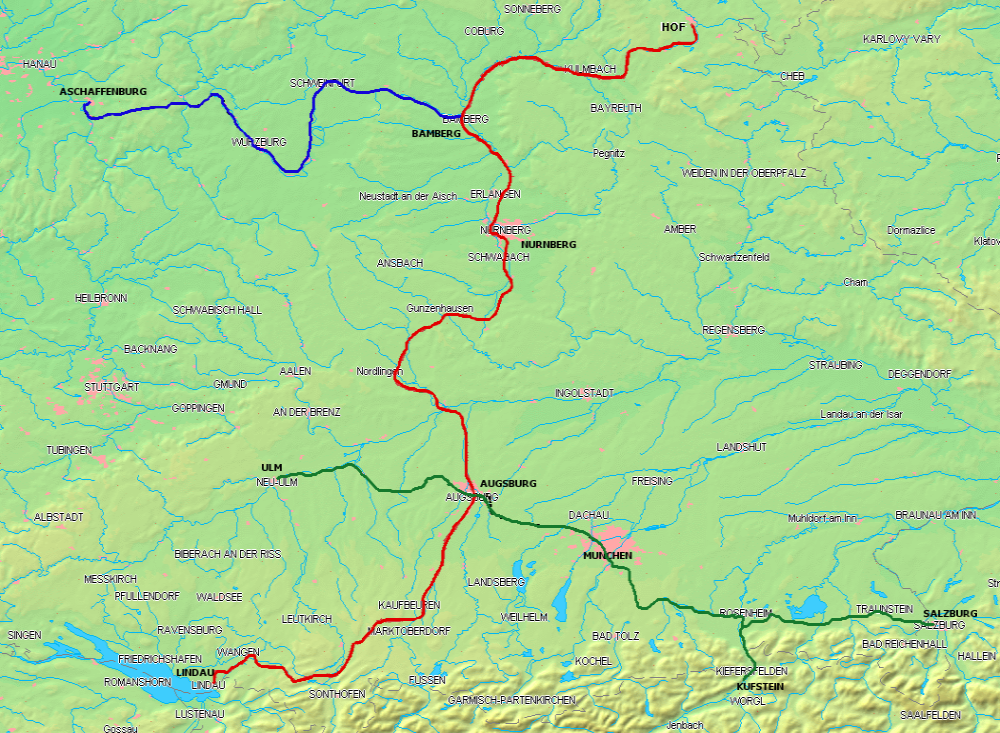
The three Bavarian main lines. The Ludwig South-North Railway is shown in red, the Ludwig's Western Railway is shown in blue, and the Bavarian Maximilian Railway in green

With the nationalisation of the Munich-Augsburg route in 1844 the Bavarian state railway era began. In the beginning the Royal Bavarian State Railways concentrated on the construction of 3 main lines:

- The Ludwig South-North Railway (Ludwig-Süd-Nord-Bahn), 548 km long and built between 1844 and 1853. It ran from Lindau near Lake Constance via Kempten, Augsburg, Nuremberg and Bamberg to Hof, Germany near the present Czech border and linked to the Saxon railway network.
- Ludwig's Western Railway (Ludwigs-West-Bahn), which was 100 km long, built from 1852 to 1854 and opened in sections. It ran from Bamberg via Schweinfurt and Würzburg to Aschaffenburg with a link into the state of Hesse.
- The Bavarian Maximilian’s Railway (Maximilians-Bahn) which ran from Ulm to Augsburg and from Munich to Kufstein with a branch to Salzburg in Austria. It was built from 1853 to 1860 and was 188 km long.

In the following years the state railway network was continually expanded. Gaps were closed and from the middle of the 1880s the countryside was opened up with an extensive branch line network. These were known as the Lokalbahnen or 'local lines'.

== Bavarian branch lines (Lokalbahnen) ==
Branch lines were once a common feature of the Bavarian countryside. The constant ringing of bells (German: bimmeln) as they crossed ungated tracks gave rise to the nickname Bimmelbahn. There were over 180 of them, including about 20 private lines. The majority were standard gauge but some were narrow gauge, including the Chiemsee-Bahn which still operates today as a roadside tramway. But motorisation, especially after the Second World War, led to widespread closures. By 1977 there were only 79 branch lines left and further closures have occurred since. By contrast, some lines are enjoying new-found museum status, such as Mellrichstadt–Fladungen, and others continue to thrive as a result of border re-opening and holiday traffic, as in the Bavarian Forest (Bayerische Wald).

In 1995 the Nuremberg Nordost to Gräfenberg branch (built in 1908) was still running in the traditional way with a locomotive and two coaches, albeit of modern stock, but most surviving branches are operated by DMUs. The first branch line proper was built in 1872 and ran from Siegelsdorf to Markt Erlbach. The last was Zwiesel to Bodenmais, in the Bavarian Forest, which opened as late as 1928 and is still operational.

Track was often lightly laid, limiting axle-loading to 4.25 or 5 tonnes. On well-drained land, sand, gravel, cinders or a mix of the three was sometimes used instead of normal ballast. Rail bridges were simple and tracks followed the lines of roads, paths, or rivers where possible to keep civil engineering to a minimum. Specially designed branch line coaches (Lokalbahnwagen) were produced from the 1890s onwards, initially in green livery with white outlines. These lasted well into the 1960s. On some of the more robust lines, wooden or steel 'thunderboxes' were used from the 1930s onwards, and even former main line six-wheelers were cascaded to some branches.

== Railways taken over by the Royal Bavarian State Railways ==
- On 1 June 1846 the Royal Bavarian State Railways took over the Munich-Augsburg Railway Company with its 62 km of railway line. The purchase price was 4.4 million gulden.
- On 15 May 1875 the Bavarian Eastern Railway (Bayerische Ostbahn) were taken over with their main lines Munich-Regensburg-Bayreuth/Eger and Nuremberg-Passau as well as all their branch lines; a total of some 900 km of line.
- On 1 January 1909 the 3 private railways which were grouped into the Palatinate Railway were taken over by the Royal Bavarian State Railways. Their network at this point comprised 870 kilometres of line, of which 60 km was narrow gauge. The state had to find around 300 million marks for this purchase. The three private lines were the:
  - Palatine Ludwig Railway (Pfälzische Ludwigsbahn)
  - Palatine Maximilian Railway (Pfälzische Maximiliansbahn)
  - The Palatine Northern Railway Company (Gesellschaft der Pfälzischen Nordbahnen) with the Neustadt–Dürkheim Railway Company (Neustadt-Dürkheimer Eisenbahn-Gesellschaft)

== Organisation ==
The regional administrative branches were originally called railway offices (Bahnämter) and major railway offices (Oberbahnämter). The latter were located in Augsburg, Bamberg, Ingolstadt, Kempten, Munich, Nuremberg, Regensburg, Rosenheim, Weiden and Würzburg. Prior to 1886 they were subordinated to the "Head Office of the Royal Transport Institution" (Generaldirektion der königlichen Verkehrsanstalten). From 1886 to 1906 they came under the "Head Office of the Royal Bavarian State Railways" (Generaldirektion der königlich bayerischen Staatseisenbahnen). In 1906 railway divisions were created and they reported to the State Ministry of Transportation. These were the Augsburg, Ludwigshafen/Rhein, Munich, Nuremberg, Bamberg, Regensburg and Würzburg divisions which, apart from Bamberg (absorbed into the Nuremberg division) were taken over by the German Imperial Railway Authority (Deutsche Reichseisenbahnen) after 1920.

== Locomotives of the Royal Bavarian State Railways ==
Like the majority of its sister administrations in the other German states, the Royal Bavarian State Railways procured its railway engines from locomotive manufacturers within its own borders. These included Joseph Anton von Maffei and the Krauss & Co. Engine Works of Munich. Four engines were purchased from Baldwin in the US in 1899 and 1901 in order to study modern construction techniques. The knowledge thus obtained was used in the design of new Bavarian machines. Details of the individual Bavarian locomotive classes may be found in the List of Bavarian locomotives and railbuses.

== Bavarian locomotives ==
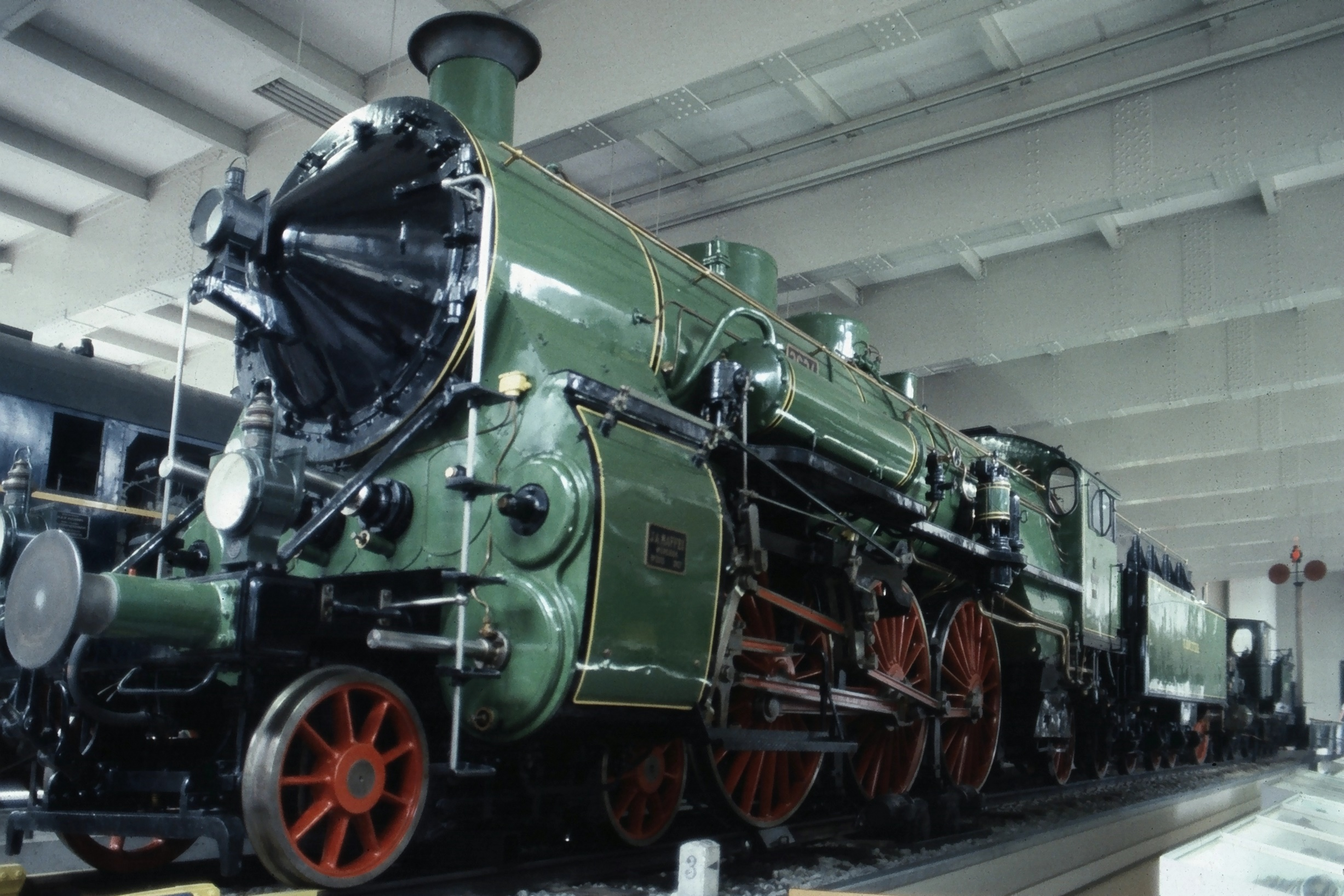
The Bavarian Class S 3/6 Locomotive

The one example of the Bavarian S 2/6 engine was designed and built by Anton Hammel, an engineer at the Maffei Locomotive Works, within 5 months and was displayed to the public at the 1906 Nuremberg State Exhibition. After its return from the exhibition it was taken over by the Royal Bavarian State Railways on 21 November 1906. A few months later, in July 1907, it set the world speed record for steam locomotives, recording a top speed of 154.5 km/h on the Munich to Augsburg line. Since being taken out of service in 1925 it has been preserved in the Nuremberg Transport Museum.

After the success of this record-holding locomotive, Hammel designed a Pacific engine for Bavaria, based on the Class IVf engines built by Maffei for the Baden State Railways. This new express locomotive, the Bavarian S 3/6 (later the DRG Class 18.4-5), illustrated right, was a major success and continued to be built by the DRG. For many enthusiasts this is the most beautiful German steam locomotive and its popularity is testified by the numerous models produced in recent years by manufacturers such as Roco, Märklin and Trix.

In 1914 the first units of the most powerful Bavarian steam locomotive, the Class Gt 2x4/4 Mallet tank engine (later DRG Class 96.0) entered service. This was used in pusher service to support trains on the steeper Bavarian inclines.

Perhaps the most iconic branch line engine was the Bavarian PtL 2/2 nicknamed the Glaskasten or "glass box". The first ones were built at the Maffei and Krauss locomotive works in Munich in 1906. Their design was radically new, the most striking features being the large driver’s cab which surrounded the entire boiler and the semi-automatic firing which enabled one-man operation. Gangways at the front and rear allowed train staff to cross over to the engine even on the move. Twenty-nine locomotives of this class were produced up to 1909 and another three were delivered by Krauss in 1910 for the Prussian state railways. Seven survived the Second World War and the last one retired in 1963.

== List of Bavarian coaches and goods wagons ==
The following is a representative list of Bavarian coaches and goods wagons:

== Branch lines ==
- CL Bay 06b, short open coach
- GwL, line goods van
- PwPost Bay 06, mail/luggage van
- CL Bay 11a, long open coach

== Railway museums in Bavaria ==
- Augsburg Railway Park, Augsburg.
- Bavarian Railway Museum, Nördlingen.
- Bavarian Localbahn Society museum, Bayerisch Eisenstein.
- Deutsches Museum, Munich.
- DB Museum, Nuremberg.
- Franconian Switzerland Steam Railway, Ebermannstadt.
- Freilassing Locomotive World, Freilassing.
- German Steam Locomotive Museum, Neuenmarkt/Wirsberg.
- Mellrichstadt-Fladungen railway, based at Fladungen.
- Nuremberg Transport Museum, Nuremberg.

== See also ==
- Bavarian Eastern Railway Company (Bayerische Ostbahn)
- Kingdom of Bavaria
- List of Bavarian locomotives and railbuses
- Bavarian railway signals

== Sources ==
1. Meyers Konversationslexikon von 1888.
2. Organisationsstruktur der Königlich Bayerischen Staatseisenbahnen.
3. On the Nebenbahnen, Model Trains International, 20 November 1995.

== Bibliography ==
- Günther Scheingraber: Die Königlich Bayerischen Staatseisenbahnen. Frankh, Stuttgart 1975, ISBN 3-440-04233-2
- Ludwig von Welser: Bayern-Report. Merker, Fürstenfeldbruck 1994–2001 (Bände 4–9)
