= Mellrichstadt–Fladungen railway =

Heritage railway line in Germany

Mellrichstadt–Fladungen
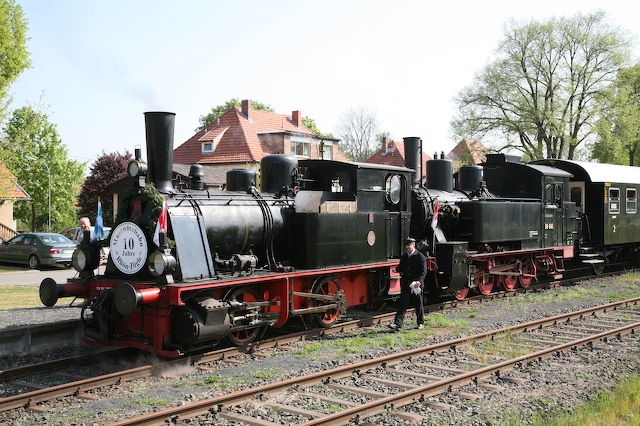

Overview
- Line number: 5243

Service
- Route number: 813

Technical
- Line length: 18.4 km
- Track gauge: 1,435 mm (standard gauge)

The Mellrichstadt–Fladungen railway, also called the Streu Valley Line (Streutalbahn), is a Bavarian branch line that connects Mellrichstadt in Lower Franconia (Unterfranken) with the town of Fladungen, which nestles in the Rhön mountains.

== History ==
Public transport arrived in the Streu Valley in 1838, but only a few of the local inhabitants could afford the luxury of travelling by post coach. Ostheim, an enclave of the Grand Duchy of Saxe-Weimar-Eisenach pressed for a railway link as early as 1853. But it was only in 1866 that Bavaria decided to extend the railway network into the remote and poorly served Rhön mountains in the north of the state. In 1871 the line from Schweinfurt to Bad Kissingen was opened, but it was another 18 years before the Lokalbahn AG was initially tasked with building a line from Mellrichstadt to Ostheim, only for it to be cancelled. Finally, in 1897, work began, and the line was completed on 20 December 1898.

The early years were dominated by goods transportation for agriculture, forestry and emerging local industries. Increasing tourist traffic also generated business for the line and surrounding hostelries. Until 1911, management of the line was based at Fladungen; from that time it transferred to Mellrichstadt.

South of Ostheim the sawmill Nix & Zinn still had to load its products at the line; later an industrial siding was built. From the factory site to the loading ramp a narrow-gauge industrial line handled the movement of goods, mainly railway sleepers. During the First World War, services had to be cut to two pairs of trains daily and the shortage of coal meant that operations even had to be ceased for a while at the end of the war, restarting in January 1920. In 1927 the route was raised 7 metres higher by Stockheim station in order to cross the state road.

Soon after the opening of a basalt works in Fladungen, the capacity of the terminus there proved inadequate and significant expansion was needed. The station tracks were extended to the north via an embankment. A ramp was erected on the station approach where building material for the new High Rhön Road (Hochrhönstrasse) was transshipped.

Passenger services were withdrawn in 1976 and the last goods train ran in 1987 when the Streu Valley line was finally closed by the Deutsche Bundesbahn.

== Museum railway ==
In 1996 the branch was opened again as far as Ostheim as a museum railway operating the so-called Little Rhön Train (Rhön-Zügle). In 2000, the entire route to Fladungen was opened again. The museum's jewel in the crown is its restored Bavarian GtL 4/4 steam engine, number 98 886, which is on loan from the town of Schweinfurt. The museum railway is part of the Franconian Open Air Museum (Fränkisches Freilandmuseum) and the railway is operated by the Lower Main Railway Friends (Eisenbahnfreunden Untermain).

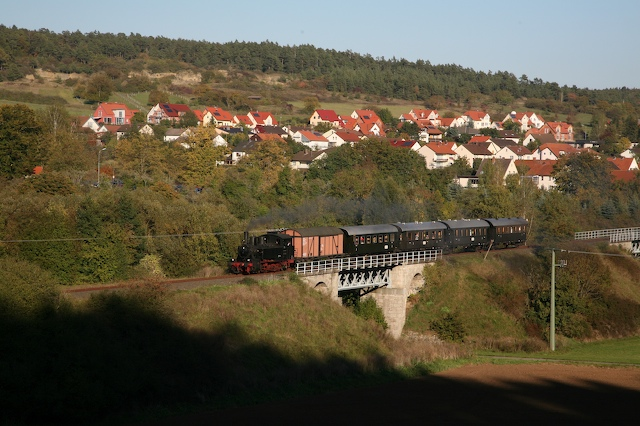
98 886 at Stockheim in August 2006

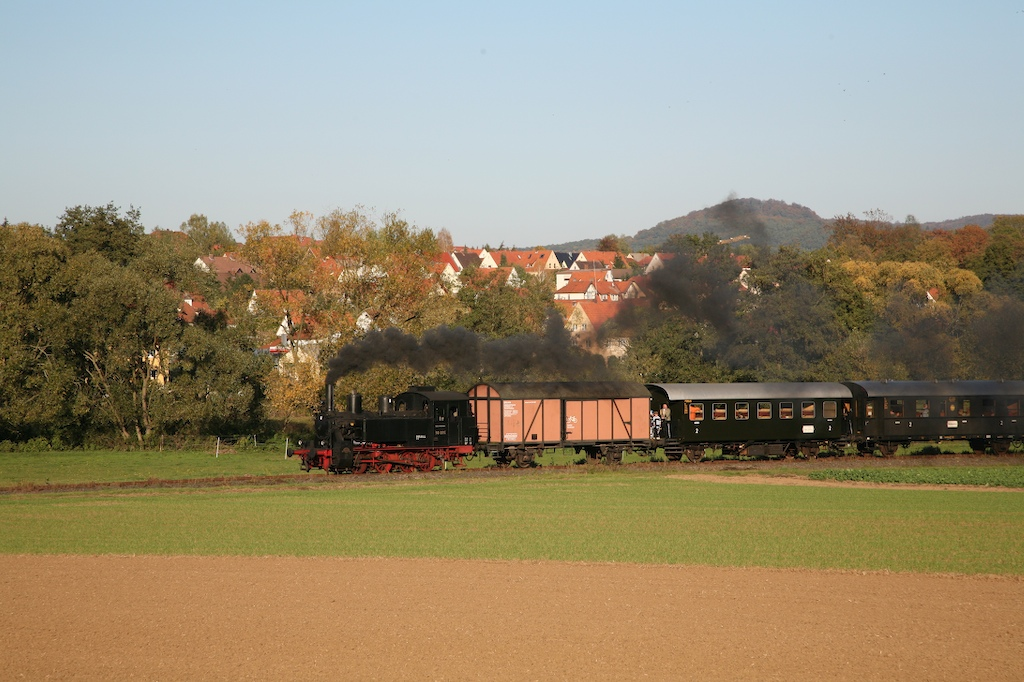
98 886 heading for Ostheim

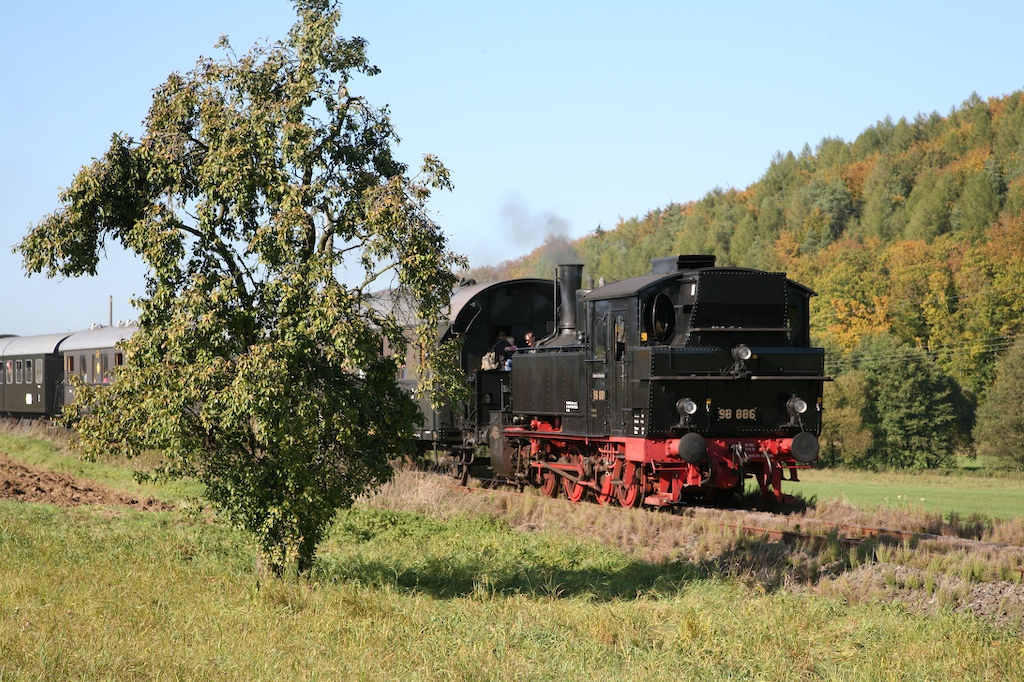
98 886 at Heufurt level crossing heading down the valley

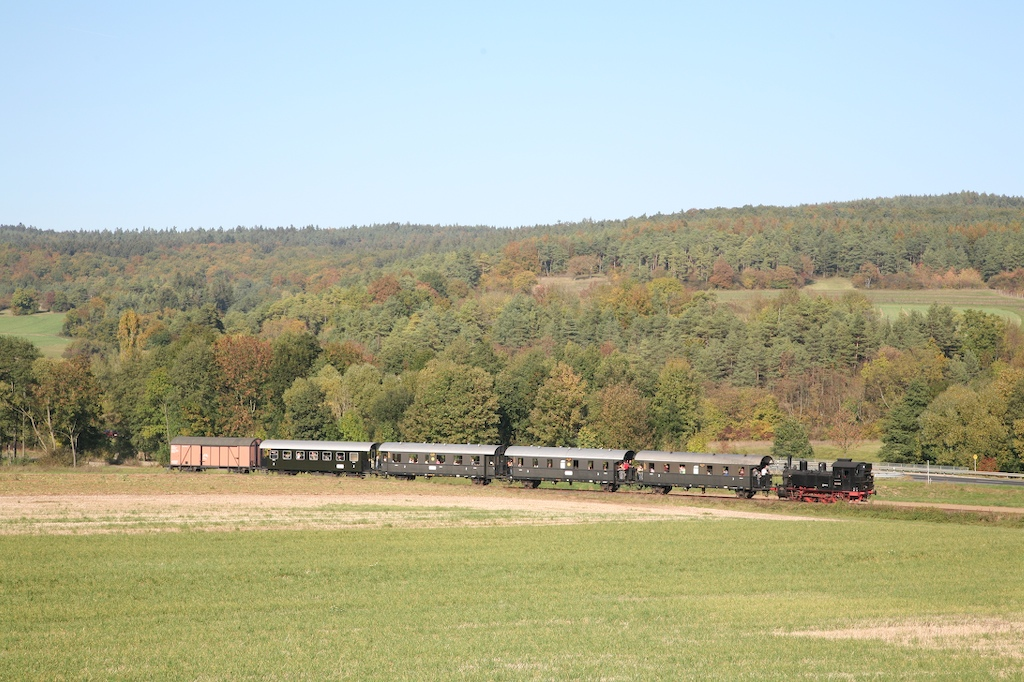
98 886 by Nordheim heading down the valley

== Sources ==
- German Wikipedia article at Bahnstrecke Mellrichstadt–Fladungen
- Lokalbahn von Mellrichstadt nach Fladungen

== See also ==
- History of rail transport in Germany
- Royal Bavarian State Railways
- Deutsche Reichsbahn
- Deutsche Bundesbahn

== Literature ==
- Fränkische Nebenbahnen - Mittel- und Unterfranken / W. Bleiweis, E. Martin / Bufe-Fachbuch-Verlag
- Die Lokalbahn Mellrichstadt - Fladungen / W. Bleiweis / H&L-Publikationen Verlag W. Bleiweis
- Eisenbahn in Unterfranken / W. Bleiweis, Th. Mäuser / Bufe-Fachbuch-Verlag
- Nebenbahnen in Unterfranken / A. Kuhfahl / Eisenbahn-Fachbuch-Verlag
