= Reichsbahndirektion München =

Reichsbahndirektion München (RBD München) was a Deutsche Reichsbahn railway division within the Bavarian Group Administration in southern Germany with its headquarters in Munich (German: München), Bavaria.

The area covered by this division largely comprised the Bavarian province of Upper Bavaria, extending over the foothills of the Alps and into the Bavarian Alps themselves.

Important routes within the division were:

- (Augsburg) – Munich – Rosenheim – Salzburg and Kufstein – (Innsbruck)
- Treuchtlingen – Ingolstadt – Munich
- Munich – (Landshut – Regensburg/Plattling)
- Munich – Mühldorf – Simbach am Inn
- Munich – Weilheim in Oberbayern – Garmisch-Partenkirchen – Mittenwald – (Innsbruck)
