= Reichsbahndirektion Nürnberg =

Reichsbahndirektion Nürnberg (RBD Nürnberg) was a Deutsche Reichsbahn railway division within the Bavarian Group Administration in southern Germany, with its headquarters at Nuremberg (German: Nürnberg), Bavaria.

The area covered by this division included the Bavarian provinces of Middle and Lower Franconia (including the territory of the former Reichsbahndirektion of Würzburg) as well as the fringes of Upper Palatinate and Bavarian Swabia.

Important railway routes within this division were:

- Aschaffenburg – Würzburg – Nuremberg – Neumarkt (Oberpfalz) – (Regensburg)
- (Halle/Leipzig) – Ludwigsstadt – Bamberg – Nuremberg – (Treuchtlingen) – (Augsburg/Ingolstadt – Munich)
- Würzburg – Ansbach – (Treuchtlingen) – (Augsburg/Ingolstadt – Munich)
- (Erfurt) – Ritschenhausen – Schweinfurt – Würzburg – (Heilbronn – Stuttgart)
