= Reichsbahndirektion Augsburg =

Coordinates: 48.3671°N 10.8893°E

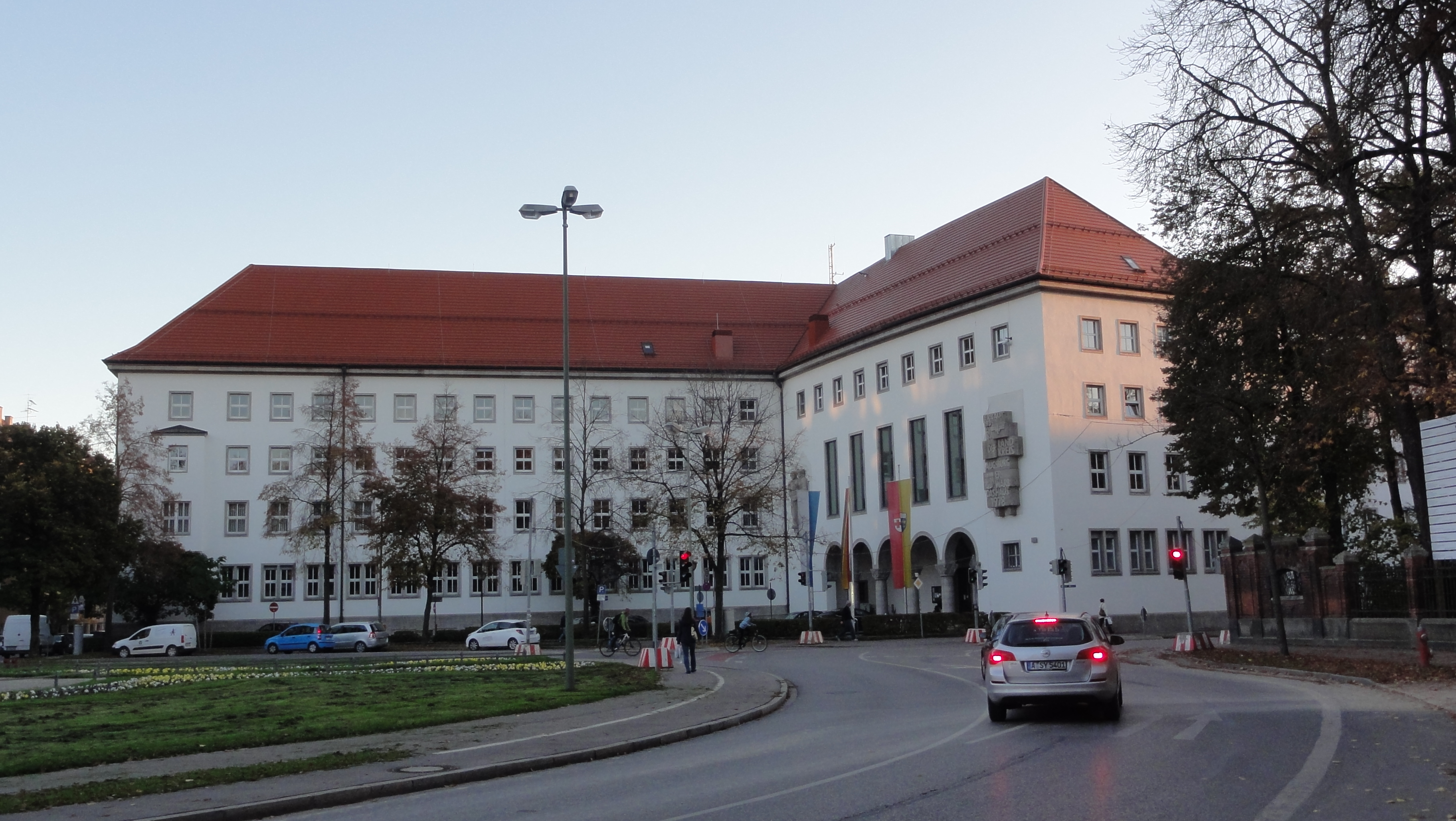
Landratsamt, ehem. Reichsbahndirektion Augsburg

Reichsbahndirektion Augsburg (RBD Augsburg) was a Deutsche Reichsbahn railway division within the Bavarian Group Administration in southern Germany.

The area covered by this division included the province of Swabia in Bavaria and extended into Upper Bavaria in the area around Augsburg. The southern section of the Ludwig South-North Railway ran through the divisional area along its entire length from (Gunzenhausen) via Donauwörth, Augsburg and Kempten (Allgäu) as far as Lindau.

Important routes within the division were:

- (Ulm) – Augsburg – (Munich)
- (Treuchtlingen) – Donauwörth – Augsburg – (Munich)
- (Ulm) – Donauwörth – (Ingolstadt) along the Danube
- (Ulm) – Memmingen – Kempten
- (Munich) – Buchloe – Kempten – Lindau
