= Bavarian Group Administration =

Railway division in Germany

The Bavarian Group Administration or Gruppenverwaltung Bayern was a largely autonomous railway administration within the Deutsche Reichsbahn (German National Railway) between the two world wars. It was formed on 1 April 1920 from the former Royal Bavarian State Railways (Königlich Bayerische Staatseisenbahnen), and was unique, Bavaria being the only former German state to have such status after the merger of the seven German state railways (Länderbahnen) into the Reichsbahn. The rest of Germany was simply divided into various regional Reichsbahn railway divisions.

The Bavarian Group Administration itself also had four railway divisions: Augsburg, Munich, Nuremberg and Regensburg which reported to it and not, as in the rest of Germany, to the Reichsbahn directly. The Ludwigshafen railway division was established on the territory of the former Palatinate Railway network. On 1 October 1933, as the only group administration within the Deutsche Reichsbahn, the Gruppenverwaltung Bayern was disbanded.

Between 1920 and about 1924 when the Deutsche Reichsbahn-Gesellschaft was created as a company to run the railways, wagons of the Bavarian Group Administration continued to display the blue and white Bavarian state shield.

== Sources ==
- Geschäftsordnung der Deutschen Reichsbahn-Gesellschaft, ss. 14, 15, 20, 21 und 24 (Regulations of the Deutsche Reichsbahn-Gesellschaft, Section III, paragraphs 14, 15, 20, 21 and 24).

== See also ==
- History of rail transport in Germany
- Royal Bavarian State Railways
- List of Bavarian locomotives and railbuses
