= Uerdingen railbus =

German diesel multiple unit railcar

DB VT 95.9 DB Class 795
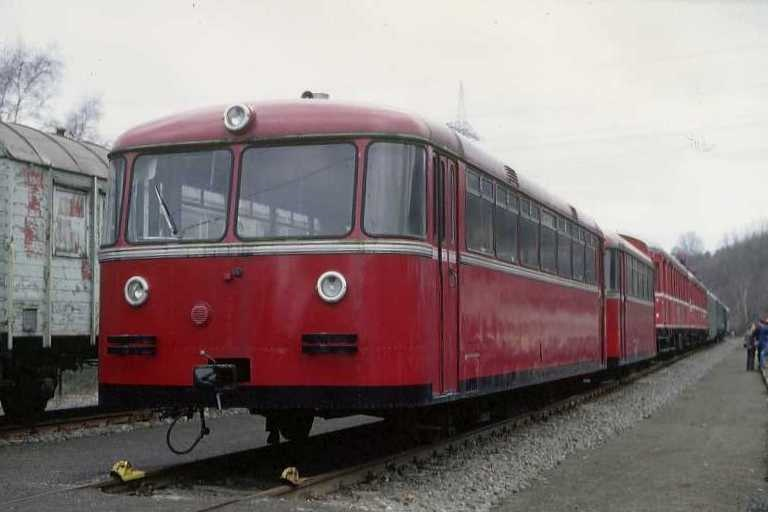
- Class VT 95.9
- In service: 1950–1983
- Manufacturers: Waggonfabrik Uerdingen, Rathgeber, Waggonfabrik Lüttgens, Waggon- und Maschinenbau GmbH Donauwörth
- Constructed: 1950–1958
- Number built: 12+557+15
- Fleet numbers: VT 95 901–911; VT 95 912/9112; VT 95 9113–9669; VT 95 9901–9915 (EdS)

Specifications
- Car length: 10.65–13.298 m (34 ft 11 1/4 in – 43 ft 7 1/2 in) over buffers
- Wheel diameter: 900 mm (2 ft 11 3/8 in)
- Maximum speed: 90 km/h (56 mph)
- Weight: Service: 11.5–13.9 t (11.3–13.7 long tons; 12.7–15.3 short tons)
- Axle load: 6–7 t (5.9–6.9 long tons; 6.6–7.7 short tons)
- Transmission: mechanical
- Power supply: 81 kW (109 hp); 96 kW (129 hp); 110 kW (150 hp)
- UIC classification: A1
- Braking system: Compressed-air brake
- Track gauge: 1,435 mm (4 ft 8 1/2 in) standard gauge

DB VT 98.9 DB Class 798
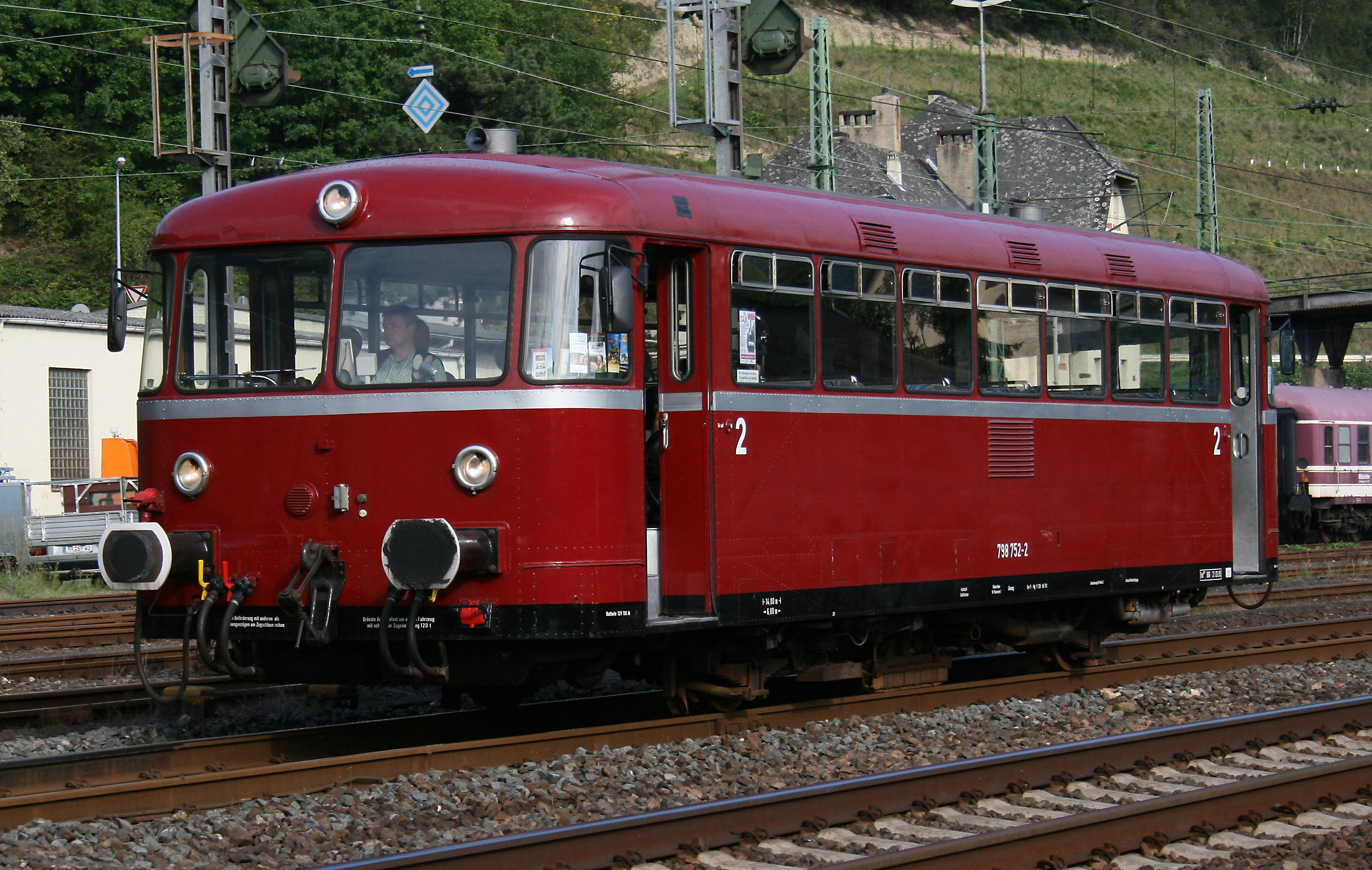
- 798 752-2 on the Kasbach Valley Railway
- In service: 1953–2000
- Manufacturers: Waggonfabrik Uerdingen, MAN, Waggon- und Maschinenbau GmbH Donauwörth
- Constructed: 1953, 1955–1962
- Number built: 329
- Fleet numbers: VT 98 901–903; VT 98 9501–9829

Specifications
- Car length: 13.95 m (45 ft 9 1/4 in)
- Wheel diameter: 900 mm (2 ft 11 3/8 in)
- Maximum speed: 90 km/h (56 mph)
- Weight: Service: 18.9 t (18.6 long tons; 20.8 short tons)
- Axle load: 9.7 t (9.5 long tons; 10.7 short tons)
- Prime mover: Büssing AG U 10
- Power output: 2 × 110 kW (150 hp)
- Transmission: mechanical
- UIC classification: Bo
- Braking system: Compressed air brake
- Track gauge: 1,435 mm (4 ft 8 1/2 in) standard gauge

The Uerdingen railbus (German: Uerdinger Schienenbus) is the common term for the multiple units which were developed by the German firm of Waggonfabrik Uerdingen for the Deutsche Bundesbahn and private railways after the Second World War. These vehicles were diesel-powered, twin-axle railbuses of light construction. The diesel motors were built into the chassis underneath the vehicle. The VT 95 (later DB Class 795) and VT 98 (later DB Class 798) of the former Deutsche Bundesbahn in particular, are associated with this concept. These vehicles were employed in passenger train duties on branch lines where steam or diesel train operations were less profitable. Including the units built under licence, a total of 1,492 power cars were built from 1950 to 1971; and the total number of units, including trailer and driving cars, was 3,306.

The majority of these vehicles were built by the Waggonfabrik Uerdingen. However, due to the large numbers ordered, vehicles were also made by other coach builders such as MAN, although these factories could offer their own classes of railbus like the MAN-Schienenbus, and in Spain they were built by CAF, Macosa, and Verdingen as FER-560/FRC-560 Ferrobús (railbus).

The railbus, much loved by passengers, was also nicknamed the Rote Brummer (Red Buzzer) because of the loud noise it made when driving. Amongst railway fans it was also called the Retter der Nebenbahnen (Branch Line Saviour).

== Classes ==
=== Prototypes ===
In 1950 the Deutsche Bundesbahn placed twelve single-motored prototypes in a total of three different models; eleven units had a wheelbase of 4.5 m (14 ft 9 in), the twelfth had a wheelbase of 6.0 m (19 ft 8 in), which became the standard on the production vehicles. They were braked using a foot brake and had double doors. The prototypes were given operating numbers VT 95 901 to 911 and 912, the latter was soon renumbered to VT 95 9112 because of its longer wheelbase. Suitable trailer cars were also placed in service.

=== VT 95 series (Class 795, single motor) ===
The VT 95.9 was developed based on the experience gained with the prototypes and was delivered in 1952 by Waggonfabrik Uerdingen. 557 single-motored Class VT 95.9 units were built, as well as 564 Class VB 142 trailer cars and 60 two-wheeled railbus trailers for the transportation of luggage.

Its furnishings are very simple and resemble those in a bus (hence the name Schienenbus or railbus): one large open coach shared also by the engine driver, seats which can be folded two-ways depending on the direction of travel and simple lighting from bare light bulbs with no covers. The production vehicles were braked using a driver's brake valve.

The vehicles had a Büssing motor and six gears. They had scharfenberg couplers and Stoßfederbügel instead of buffers.

15 VT 95 railbuses and 15 VB 142 trailer cars were delivered to the railways in Saarland in 1956. They were painted in DB red livery with the inscription SAAR. On the annexation of the Saarland into the Federal Republic of Germany these railbuses were taken over by the Bundesbahn.

In 1968 the vehicles were reclassified into Class 795 (power car) and Class 995 (trailer car).

Contrary to usual operating practice the VT 95 could also be coupled to two VB 142 trailers.

=== VT 98 series (Classes 798 and BR 796, two motors) ===
The VT 98.9 evolved from the VT 95.9 which, with its single motor, was too underpowered for many lines. The VT 98.9 was therefore fitted with two driving motors. Because this variant of the railbus was fitted with normal buffer and screw couplings, it could haul other types of wagon or be placed at the end of other trains hauled by other locomotives.

Büssing Type 10 underfloor motors were installed in all units, the same engine as those on the Büssing Type D2U double-decker buses used in Berlin. The six-way gearbox was supplied by ZF Friedrichshafen.

In addition to the 329 power cars, 220 VB 98 trailer cars with luggage compartments, 100 VB 98s without luggage compartments and 321 VS 98 driving cars were produced. In the DB they were mainly used in a VT+VB+VS configuration. However, there were also two-unit VT+VS formations as well as longer rakes of up to six units: VT+VB+VS+VT+VB+VS. In 1968 they were reclassified into Class 798, the trailers became 998.0-3 and driving cars 998.6-9. On the latter the serial numbers were increased by 600 (e.g. VS 98 001 became 998 601-9).

A few VT were modernised and were given a special white and mint green livery. These railbuses worked in Chiemgau (Aschau–Prien), as did the vehicles of the Ulmer Spatz. Otherwise the railbuses were painted in red, the typical DB colour for motive power units.

In 1988 47 power cars, 23 trailer cars and 43 driving cars were converted for one-man operation. They were given pneumatic door-closing equipment and a ticket counter for the engine driver. These railbuses were redesignated as Class 796.

=== Special class VT 97.9 (Class 797, rack railway vehicle) ===
For use on the rack-equipped Honau–Lichtenstein section of the Reutlingen–Schelklingen railway six railcars with a cogwheel drive were built, designated as Class 'VT 97.9, along with six driving cars as VS 97 001 to 97 006. These were allocated to Tübingen depot and entered service in 1962. The VT 97.9 were built by Uerdingen with a rack drive manufactured by Swiss Locomotive and Machine Works. They were mostly identical to the VT 98 but had a wheelbase of 5,950 mm (234 in) and were fitted with a magnetic track brake. They had a maximum speed of 27 km/h (17 mph) on the rack section, otherwise it was 90 km/h (56 mph).

In 1964 VT 97 901 was transferred to the Passau–Wegscheid line, where it was even employed in goods duties due to the withdrawal of suitable rack locomotives. Two additional railcars, VT 97 907 and 908, were then ordered for this line, however following its closure in 1965 they were delivered to Tübingen instead. After the closure of the Honau–Lichtenstein rack railway in 1969 the VT 97.9 were rebuilt in 1974 as normal railcars with the rack drive removed. Their area of operations included the branch line from Göppingen to Boll (the Voralbbahn), until this line was closed on 27 May 1989.

== Operations with the Deutsche Bahn ==
=== Passenger services ===
These railbuses were used on almost every branch line and for feeder services on many main lines in the Deutsche Bundesbahn and from 1994 Deutsche Bahn network.

Its last regular work on passenger services with the Deutsche Bahn AG finished in 2000 at Bahnbetriebswerk Tübingen. These were twin-motored VT 98.9 versions, most of the single-motored VT 95.9 units had already been retired by 1980. In Köln-Nippes a 795 was still being used until 1983 for railway workers.

=== Departmental vehicles ===
From 1955 a series of 166 catenary maintenance vehicles was built based on the VT 98 railbuses. These were fitted with a test pantograph and a work platform on the roof which could be raised up to 1 m (3 ft 3 in). These vehicles were originally designated as TVT and later as Class 701 (for vehicles with two motors) and Class 702 (for vehicles with a single motor). After all vehicles were rebuilt with a single motor they were renumbered as Class 701. The Class 702 designation was reused for vehicles fitted with dynamic braking and magnetic track brakes.

Many Uerdingen railbuses were converted into railway departmental vehicles. For example, the prototype VT 95 906 was converted into an Indusi measurement car (and redesignated as DB Class 724). It was operated out of the signalling workshop at Wuppertal. Other converted Uerdingen railbuses are sometimes used today as cars for rail testing, track measurement and LZB measurement, and as tool vans or signalling maintenance vehicles.

== Museum vehicles ==
Many of these robust railbuses were sold to railway societies and museums, and are still working today in museum duties.

For example, railbuses are still used by the Deutsche Bahn, even if the actual vehicles are provided by railway societies. One multiple is painted in Regionalbahn colours and runs on summer weekends for tourists on the Schwäbische Albbahn and the Ulm–Sigmaringen railway between Ulm Hauptbahnhof and Kleinengstingen. These trains run in the timetable as an entirely normal Regionalbahn service; The first car has a plate on it with the notice "im Auftrag der DB" (under contract to the DB). To be consistent, all the normal DB local fares (and at times the NALDO and DING combined fares) apply. The former Chiemgaubahn railbuses, which were painted in white and mint green, are used for this, along with others. This formation is also called the Ulmer Spatz.

Other vehicles are in service with the:

- Bochum-Dahlhausen Railway Museum,
- Passau Railway Society (Passauer Eisenbahnfreunde),
- German Steam Locomotive Museum,
- Bavarian Railway Museum,
- Upper Hessian Railway Society (Oberhessische Eisenbahnfreunde e. V.),
- Historic Railway, Frankfurt,
- Alme Valley Forest Railway (Waldbahn Almetal),
- Railbus Society (Hönnetaler Eisenbahnfreunde),
- Rodachtalbahn from Steinwiesen to Nordhalben.
- Cologne-Bonn Railway Society (Köln-Bonner Eisenbahn-Freunde or KBEF)
- South Limburg Steam Train Society (Zuid-Limburgse Stoomtrein Maatschappij)
- Zollernbahn Railway Society (Eisenbahnfreunde Zollernbahn)
- Seelze Railbus Society (IG Schienenbus Seelze or ISS)

Uerdingen railbuses are also owned by the

- Nuremberg Transport Museum - one VT 95 rake and one VT 98 rake,
- Deutsches Technikmuseum in Berlin - a VT 98 exhibit,
- Historic Motor Locomotive Working Group (Arbeitsgemeinschaft Historische Brennkraftlokomotiven) - a steel-sprung VT 98,
- Honau-Lichtenstein Rack Railway Society (Freunde der Zahnradbahn Honau–Lichtenstein) - two VT 97s,
- Hamm Railway Society - one of the few still working VT 95 railbuses on long loan to the Freundeskreis für Eisenbahnen, Münster,
- DGEG at Bochum-Dahlhausen - a VT 95 in extremely poor condition after a shunting accident,
- Pfalzbahn GmbH - 2 VT 98, 1 trailer and 1 driving car with office.

== Gallery ==
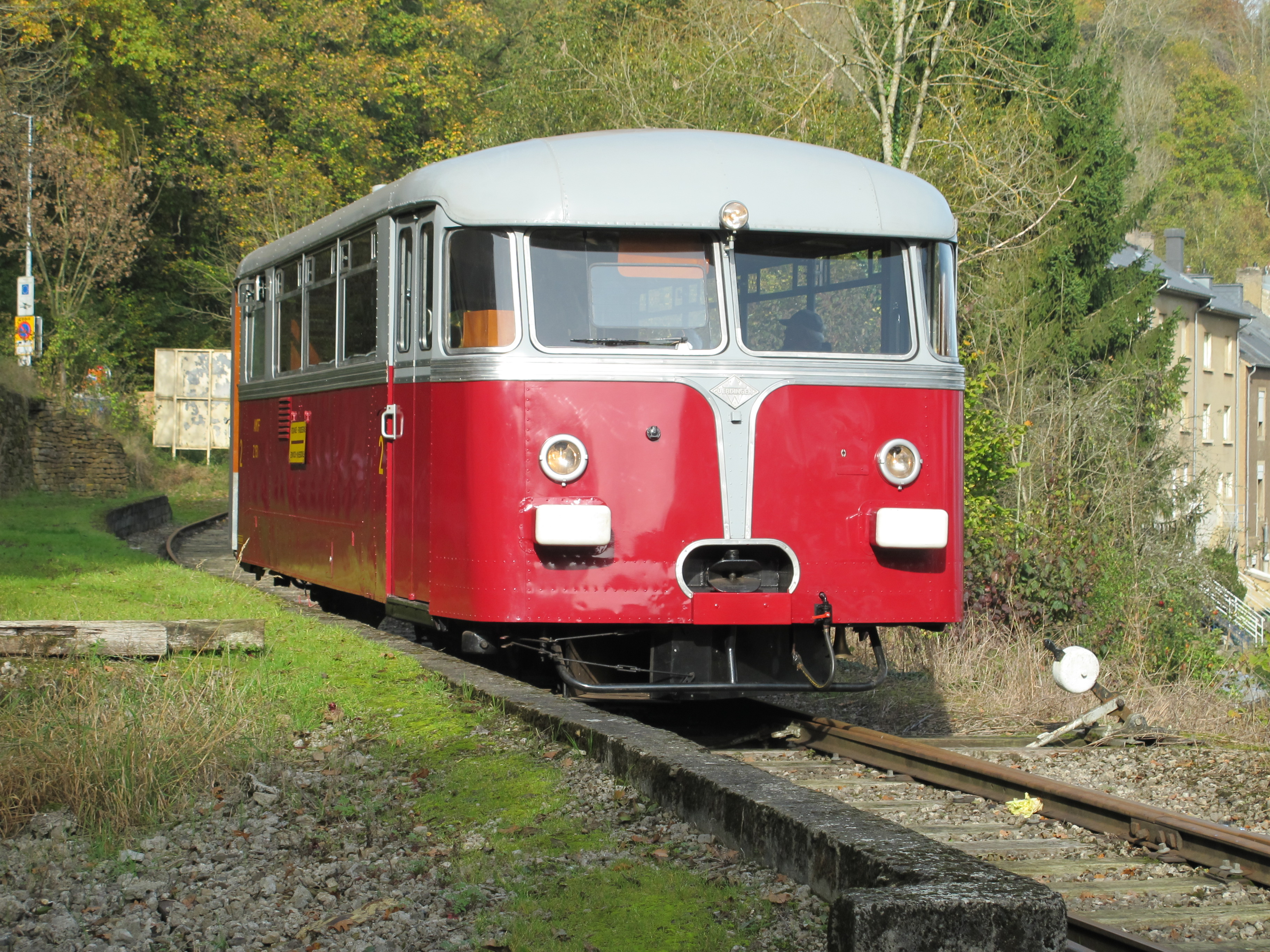
Uerdinger Schienenbus (prototype) in Bois de Rodange

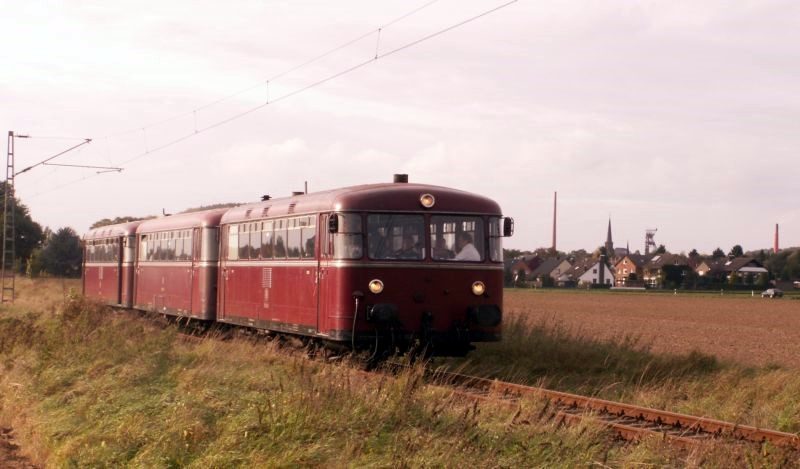
A class VT98.9 at Hückelhoven in 1970

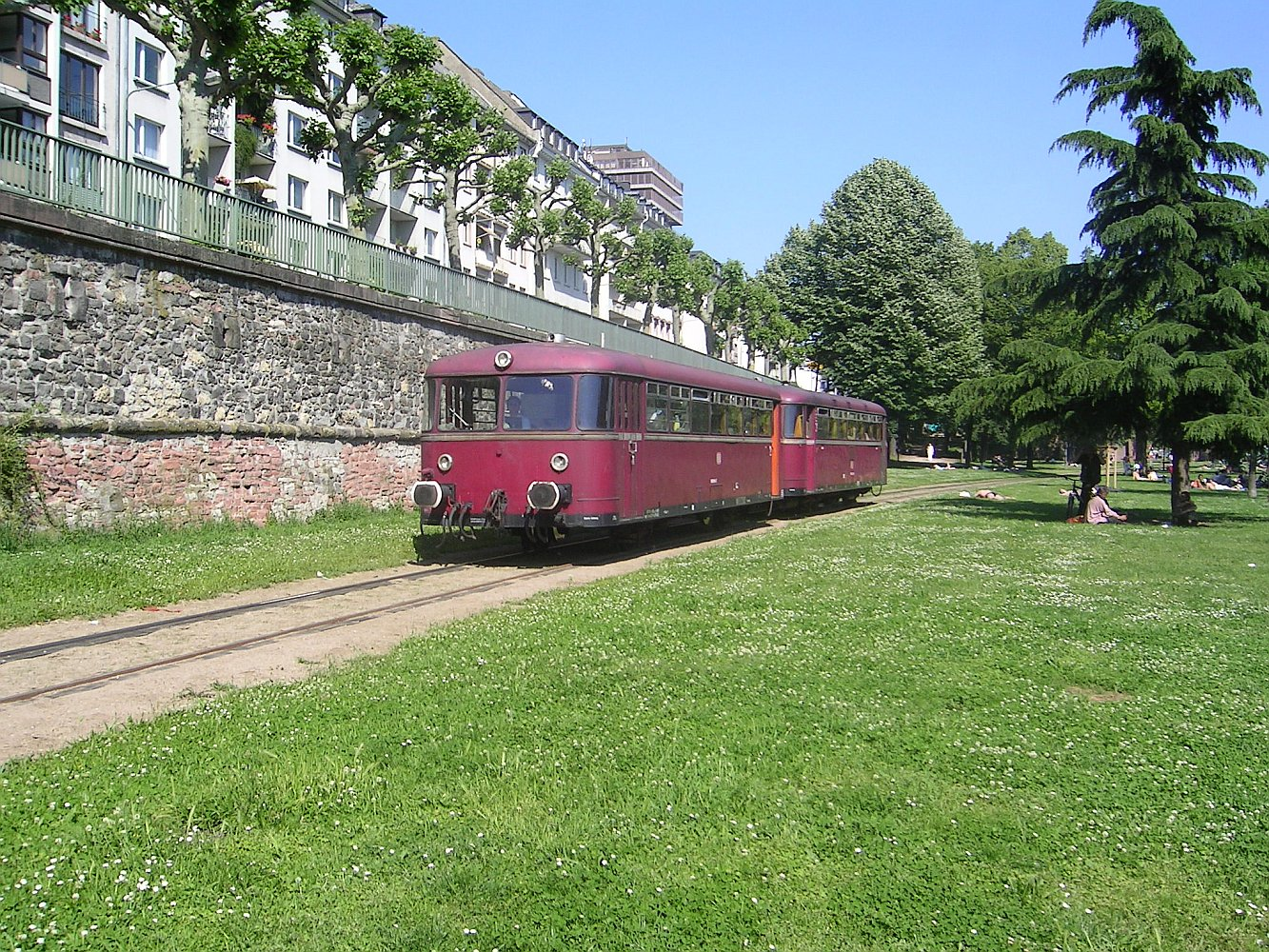
A VT 98 on the harbour railway in Frankfurt

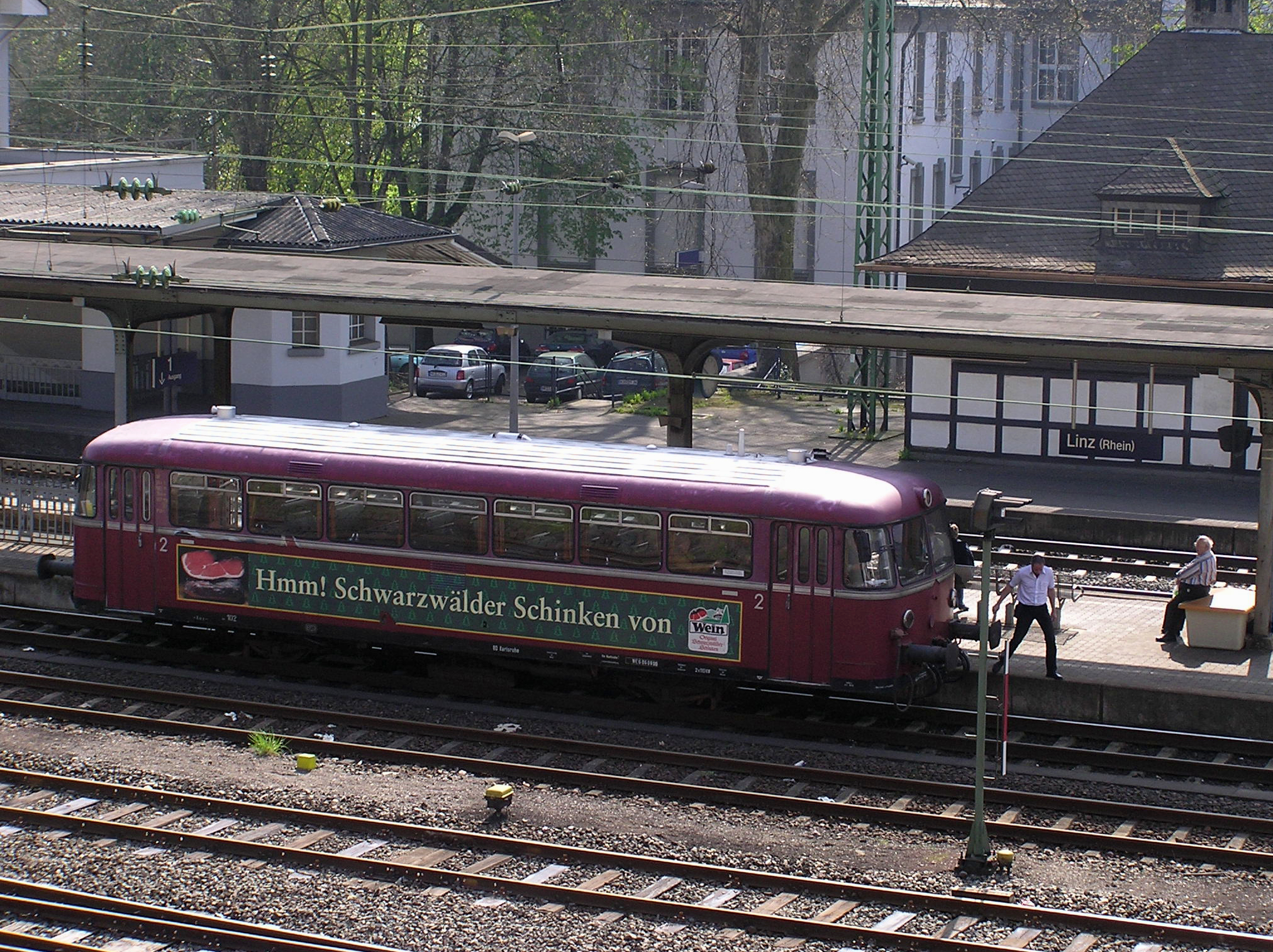
The VT 98 on the Kasbach Valley Railway at Linz am Rhein

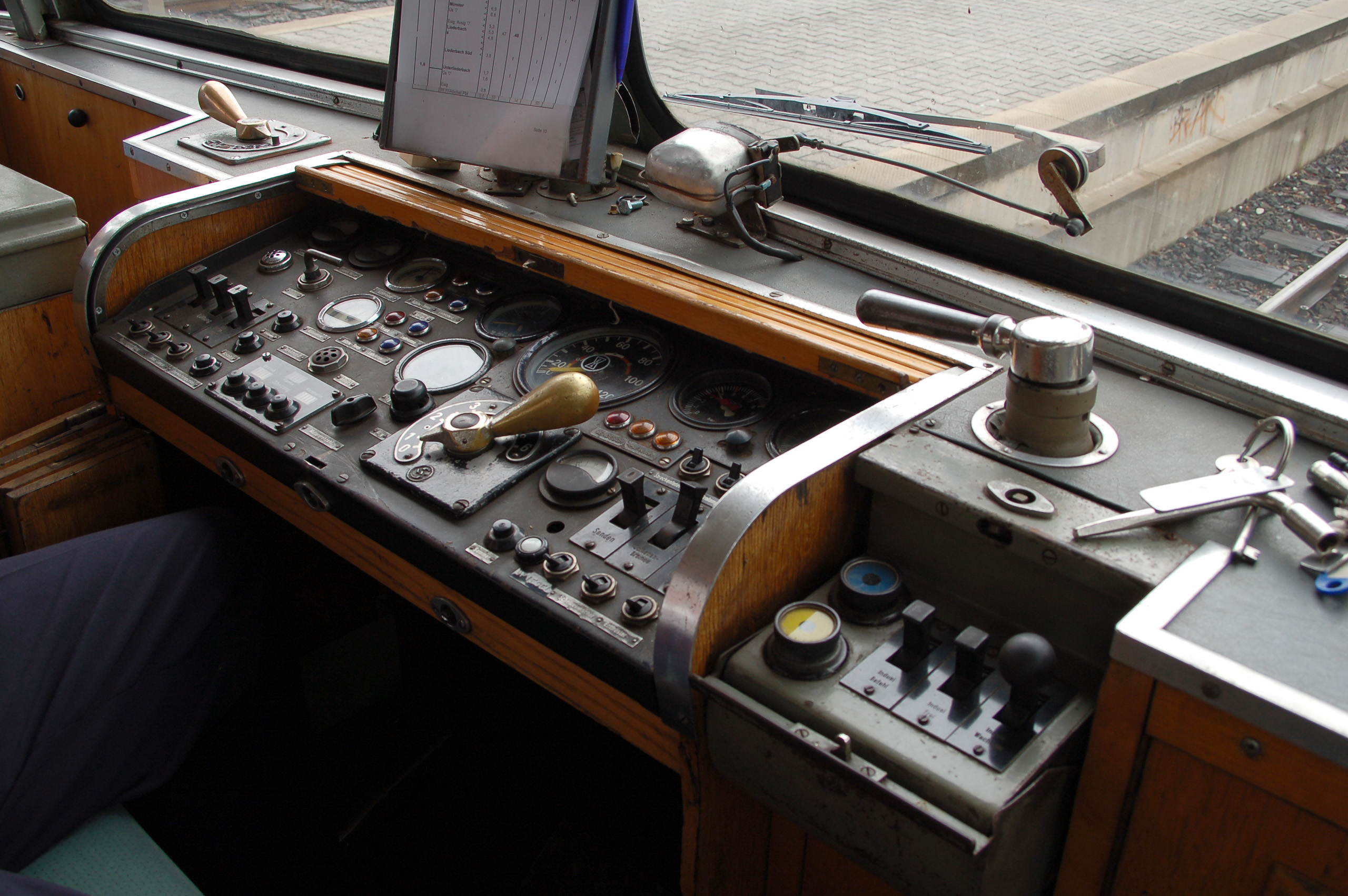
The control panel of a VT 98

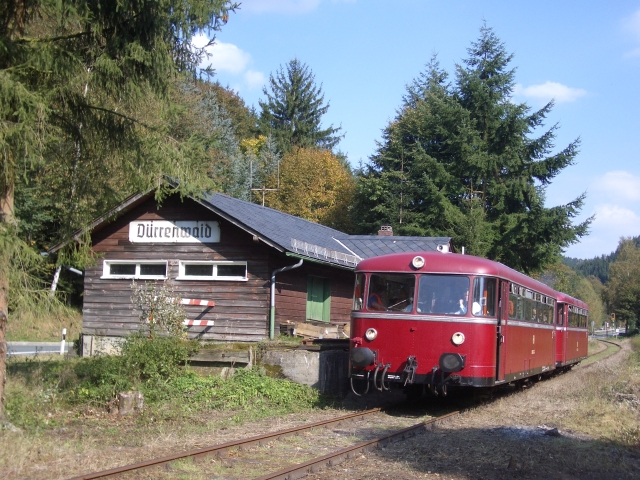
798+998 pass Dürrenwaid stop on the Kronach–Nordhalben railway

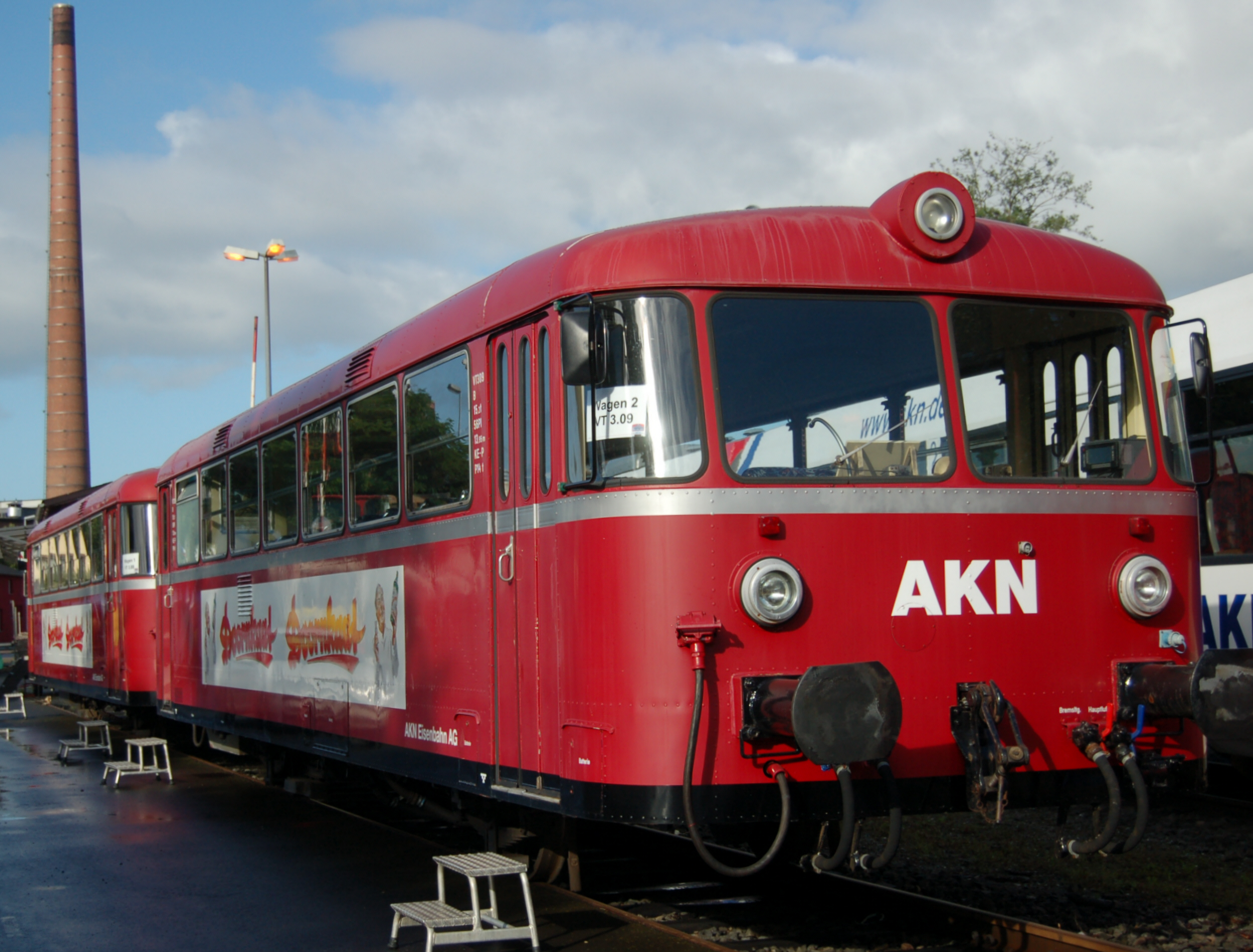
VT 98 (VT 3.09) of the AKN at Uetersen

== German private railways ==
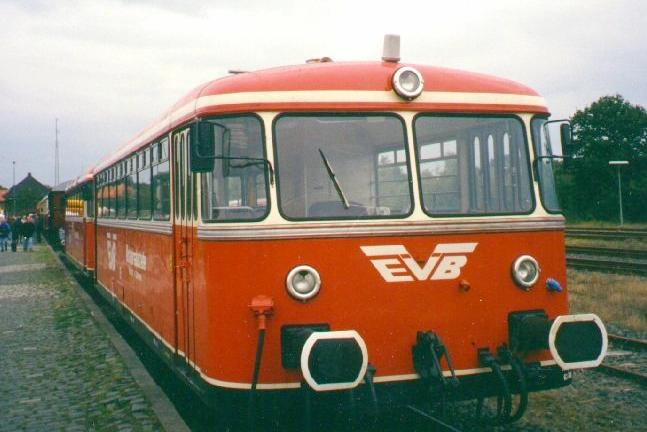
Railbus operated by the EVB

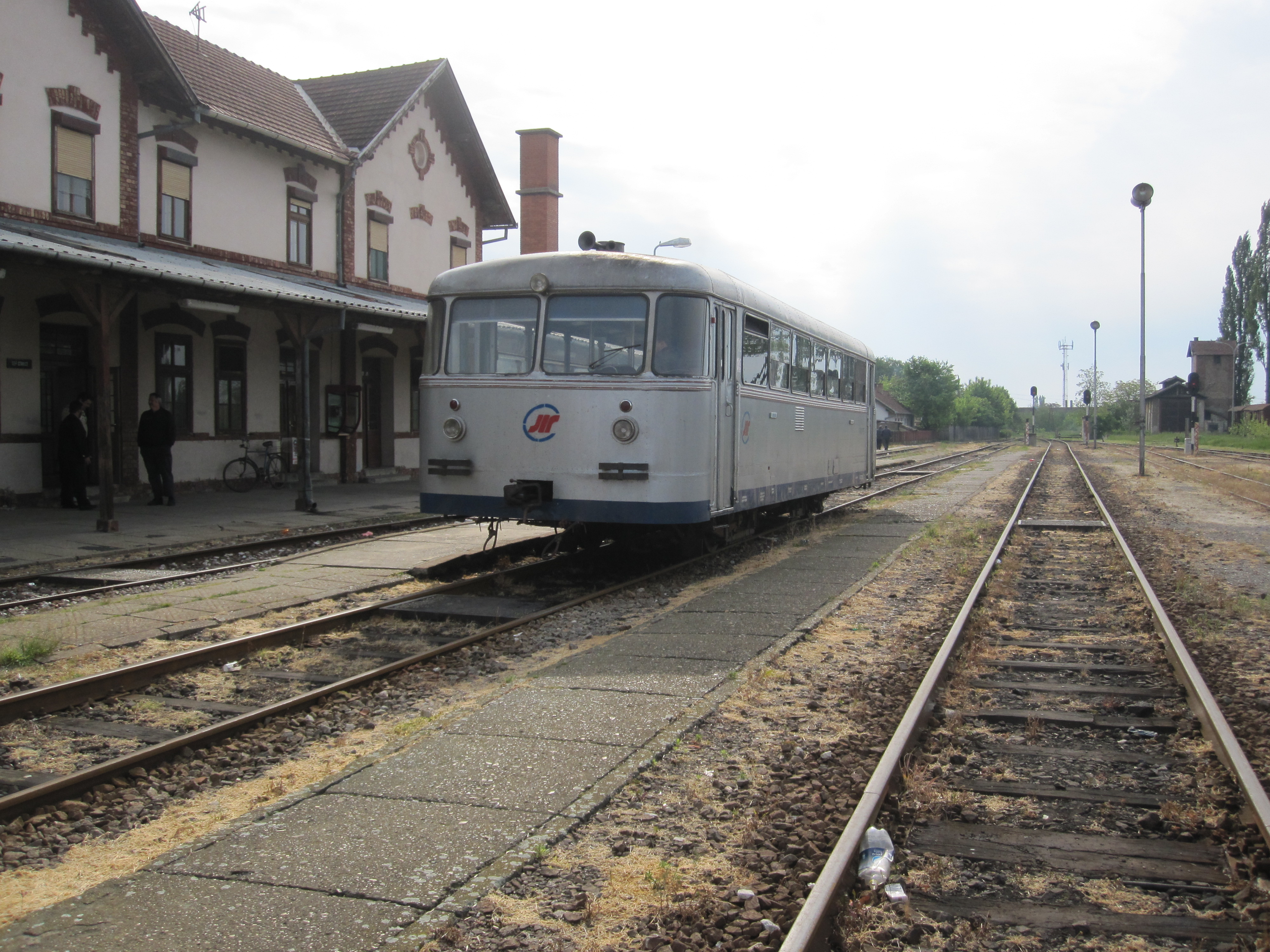
Gosha 812 railbus, nickname "Silver Arrow", Yugoslav made under licence single-motored Class VT 95, operated by the SR.

Many private railways have bought second-hand Uerdingen railbuses from the Deutsche Bahn. The Hersfelder Kreisbahn procure new ones, though, including a three-unit set with rubber corridor connectors and gangways. Used cars of this type were employed, inter alia by the Elbe-Weser Railway and Transport Company and the AKN Railway for local services.

In 1993 the Düren Kreisbahn (DKB) bought ten VT 98, modernised them, painted them blue and white and placed them in service on the Rurtalbahn until their duties were subsumed by RegioSprinters in 1995. The Vt 203 was sold by the Düren Kreisbahn to the Hümmlinger Kreisbahn museum railway. The museums is refurbishing the railbus to make it operational again, giving it the DB number 798 514, and will work it between Werlte and Lathen.

Other second-hand VT 98s were bought by the Prignitz Railway– both from Deutsche Bahn and the DKB – painted in a blue and red livery and used on lines in Brandenburg and Mecklenburg-Vorpommern. Since 2003 the railbuses have been replaced however by Regio-Shuttle RS1s; only one power car (T11) is still working and available for specials. At present the Deutsche Regionaleisenbahn works the Düben-Heide Railway between Wittenberg and Bad Schmiedeberg with a railbus running scheduled services.

== Export ==
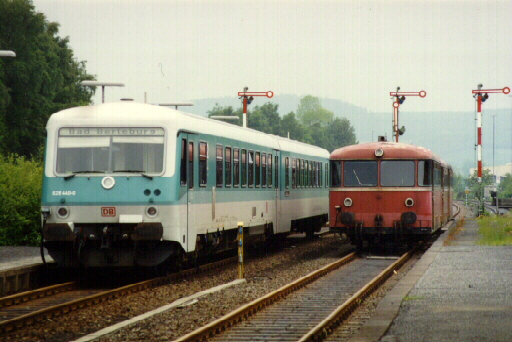
DB 628 next to DB 798 at Bad Laasphe in 1997

- Luxembourg: The Chemins de Fer Luxembourgeois (CFL) bought ten prototype power cars with trailers. One set is used as a museum train at the museum railway of the Industry and Railway Park Fond-de-Gras in Luxembourg.
- Austria: The Austrian Federal Railways (ÖBB) also used these railbuses, the 5081. These were also procured by the Montafonerbahn Bludenz–Schruns and the Graz-Köflach Railway. After buying a small batch they were made under licence by Simmering-Graz-Pauker and the Jenbacher Werke.
- Other vehicles were delivered to Yugoslavia and operated by the JŽ (SFRY), where they were known as the Šinobus or JŽ class 812. Originally 40 were imported German railbuses, while 270 units were produced under licence by Goša FOM. These vehicles were inherited by their successor companies (see the HŽ series 7221). Several were still used regularly until 2016 in Serbia. (see the ŽS series 812)
- Several multiple-units were delivered to Spain.
- Turkey: Units retired by the Deutsche Bahn were sold to the Turkish State Railways (TCDD) as RM3000.
- Uruguay: Units retired by the Deutsche Bahn were sold to the State Railways Administration of Uruguay in successive lots starting in December of 1980 and ending in 1983, the complete stock was composed of 16 VT 795 powered units (151 to 166), 12 VB 995 trailer cars (51 to 62), 12 VT 798 powered units (301 to 312), 15 VB 998 trailer cars (72 to 85) and 1 VS 998 Trailer cab (71). The stock was acquired to replace loco hauled trains and the aging fleet of 1934 to 1936 Brill 60 motorcars, vehicles with two boogie with two axles for middle and long distance services and so the Railbus were put in immense mechanical strain in badly conserved tracks at high speeds generating rejection by both Rail workers and passengers, including complaints of the intense heat inside without window modification on Uruguay's warm and humid summers; of the 12 VT 798 cars, all were out of service in 1986. After the withdrawal of all passenger services on January 2nd, 1988, 5 VT795 cars were transferred to be used as maintenance track cars (151, 155, 157, 160, 164) or emergency service cars when floods covered road bridges (156 and 162). Several VT798 cars were moved to be used as crew accommodations, but that project was later abandoned and the bodies of the cars, without windows or seats, were left in 25 de Agosto, Paso de los Toros, Cantera Suarez, Paysandú and Nico Pérez until they were scrapped. The only survivors are car 312 and trailer 77 at Nico Pérez and trailer 71 used in a park as a food place. In 2005, two cars (155 and 162) with trailers 55 and 56 were put again into service on the Montevideo-Empalme Olmos line (44 km) and ran there until the service was withdrawn again on May 31, 2012. At present, car 155 is used as a mobile workshop on the Tacuarembó-Rivera passenger service and car 162 is out of service at Peñarol workshops. All the other vt795 cars were scrapped, two trailers out of track survives as workshops in rural locations.

Italy

In the first half of the 1950s, Macchi of Varese, already engaged in bus construction, acquired the license from Ürdinger Maschinenfabrik to produce Schienenbuses in its factories. They were also called "Macchifer". The buyers were Ferrovie Reggiane (which in 1975 would later become ACT, Azienda Consorziale Trasporti Reggio Emilia) and Ferrovie del Sud Est (Bari-Taranto-Brindisi-Lecce).

== Successor ==
The Uerdingen railbus's successor from the end of the 1980s was the Class 628, which is still in widespread use today, although it is being largely replaced by more the modern multiples like the Bombardier Talent, Alstom LHB Coradia LINT and Siemens Desiro.

== See also ==
- KiHa 01/03: Japanese derivative; largely based on VT98.

== Sources ==
- Rolf Löttgers: Der Uerdinger Schienenbus – Nebenbahnretter und Exportschlager. Franckh's Eisenbahnbibliothek, Franckh'sche Verlagshandlung, Stuttgart 1985, ISBN 3-440-05463-2
- Die Schienenbusse der DB – VT 95/98. EK-Spezial. EK Verlag, Freiburg 1990
- Jörg Hajt: Abschied vom Schienenbus. Heel Verlag, Königswinter 1998, ISBN 3-89365-664-2
- 50 Jahre Uerdinger Schienenbus. Eisenbahnkurier Special 56. EK Verlag, Freiburg 2000
- Malte Werning: Schienenbusse - VT 95–VT 98: Triebwagen-Veteranen der 50er Jahre. GeraMond 2001. ISBN 3-7654-7102-X
- Jürgen-Ulrich Ebel, Josef Högemann, Rolf Löttgers: Schienenbusse aus Uerdingen. Bd. 1., Technik und Geschichte bei DB, Privatbahnen und im Ausland.EK-Verlag, Freiburg 2001, ISBN 3-88255-221-2,
- Jürgen-Ulrich Ebel, Josef Högemann, Rolf Löttgers: Schienenbusse aus Uerdingen. Bd. 2., Einsatzgeschichte der Baureihen VT 95, VT 97 und VT 98. EK-Verlag, Freiburg 2002, ISBN 3-88255-222-0
- Jürgen Krantz, Roland Meier: Alles über den Schienenbus. transpress Verlag, Stuttgart 2007, ISBN 978-3-613-71313-0
