= ŽS series 812 =

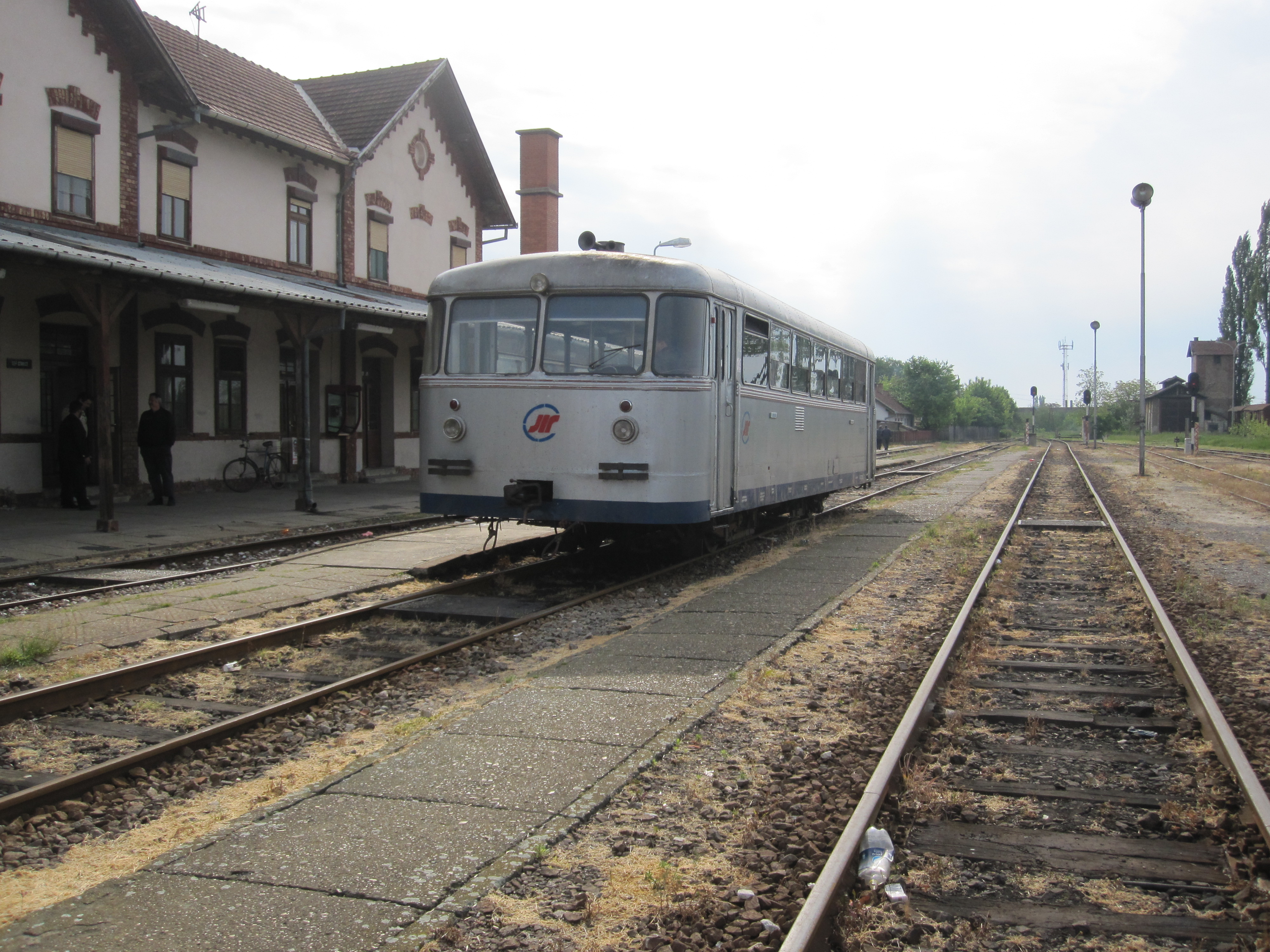
- A Serbian Railways 812 unit
- Manufacturer: Duewag, Germany
- Built at: Goša FOM, Serbia
- Constructed: 1955 (1959 GOŠA)
- Entered service: 1955 - 2016
- Number built: 270
- Operators: Yugoslav Railways; Serbian Railways

Specifications
- Car length: 13.95 m (45 ft 9 in)
- Maximum speed: 90 km/h (56 mph)
- Weight: 18.9 t (18.6 long tons; 20.8 short tons)
- Prime mover(s): Diesel
- Power output: 110 kW (150 hp)
- Transmission: Hydraulic
- UIC classification: 1A+2
- Track gauge: 1,435 mm (4 ft 8 1/2 in) standard gauge

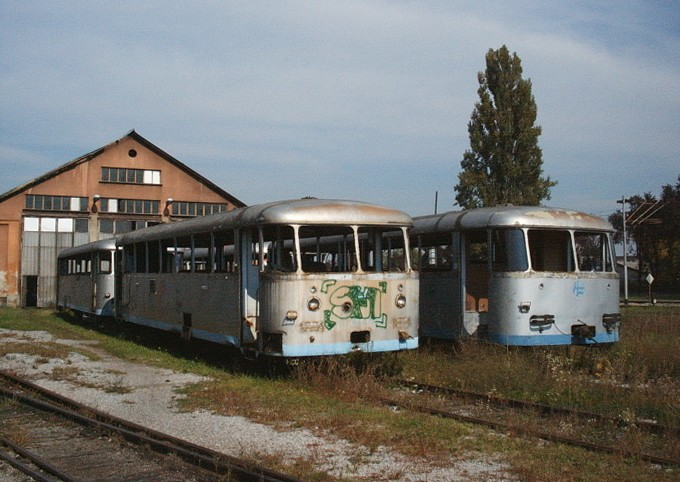
In comparison to German version, the Croatian version has JŽ-era grey livery and is slightly modified. (Disabled units in Karlovac, Croatia).

ŽS series 812 (former Yugoslav Railways JŽ series 812) was a diesel motor railbus operated by Serbian Railways. On Croatian Railways it was known as the 7221 series (Croatian: hrvatske željeznice, HŽ). Originally it was the German Uerdingen railbus produced by Goša FOM for Yugoslav Railways (JŽ).

This series was used on branch lines with low traffic. This series was very economic, but was (by today's standards) very uncomfortable. The motor was very loud when running at higher speeds. This series was conceived to be modular. It was possible to couple motor units and unpowered cars together, and drive them centrally as one train unit. This was rarely used, when there was demand on lines. It is very similar to and derives from the German Schienenbus.

== History ==
In the early 1950s, Yugoslav Railways decided to import a large number of diesel multiple units for traffic on local railway lines. The decision was made on the Uerdinger Schienenbus VT 95 series. The first multiple units in red livery arrived in 1955, and by 1959 there were 40 in service. Having performed well in service it was decided to purchase the license for mass production. The production started at Goša FOM wagon factory from Smederevska Palanka and the first domestic-made railbuses were delivered to Yugoslav Railways in silver livery. A total of 270 diesel multiple units were produced by Goša FOM until 1969, which contributed to the replacement of steam locomotives in local passenger traffic.

== Name ==
The official name of VT 95 series with Yugoslav Railways was JŽ series 812. In the 1A+2 configuration when two motor cars are connected so one is pulling another as a wagon, the DMU is known as JŽ 812/816. This configuration is basic but it was rarely used due to the small number of passengers.

The first nickname was "Silver Arrow" (Serbo-Croatian: Srebrna strela/ Сребрна стрела) due to its silver livery. It was so much faster than the old steam locomotives, the railwaymen nicknamed it "Rabbit" (Serbo-Croatian: Zec/ Зец). Because of its German origin, it is nicknamed by passengers as Schienenbus (Serbo-Croatian: Šinobus/ Шинобус), which is widely known among the people of former Yugoslavia.

== Service ==
Šinobus was operated by Serbian Railways (ŽS) on several local lines until 2016, mainly in Vojvodina. Due to their age, ŽS class 812 were replaced by the new ŽS series 711 diesel multiple units. There are some 30 railbuses in inventory but only five or six are operational.

A number of JŽ series 812 have been operated by Croatian Railways (HŽ) as HŽ series 7221 but they are no longer in service.

It stands for one of the most popular railway vehicles in the former Yugoslavia.

== Curiosity ==
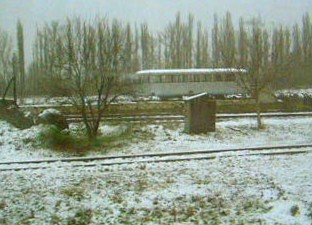
Disabled unit for spare parts on Vinkovci "Ranžirni Kolodvor" in winter

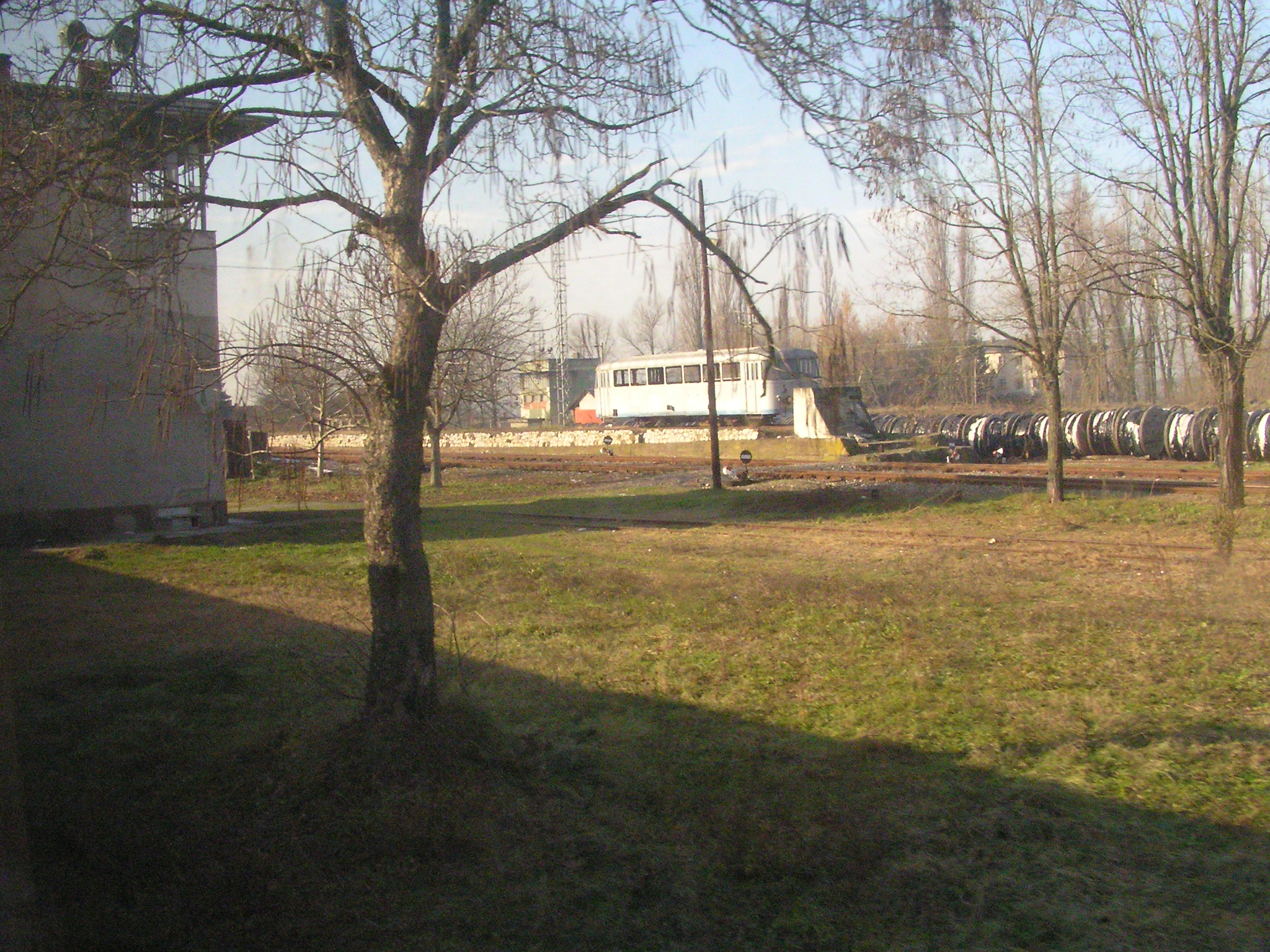
Disabled unit for spare parts on Vinkovci "Ranžirni Kolodvor" on a warm day

There also exists a special version of this vehicle. It is painted blue and is used as a track measure train. It is located in Zagreb, on "Ranžirni Kolodvor" and used occasionally to monitor track on branch lines.

== Gallery ==
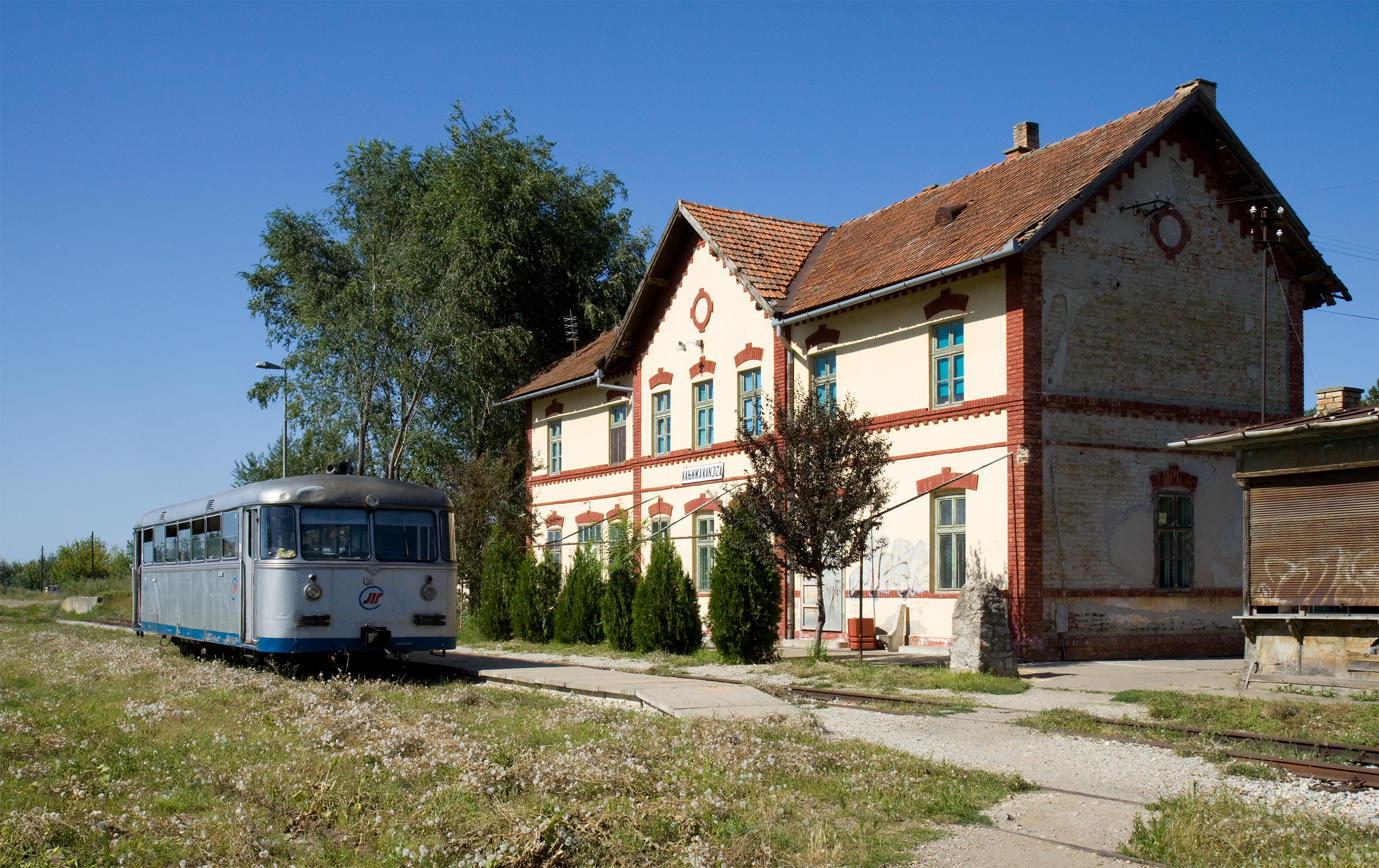
Šinobus at its terminal station Kanjiža

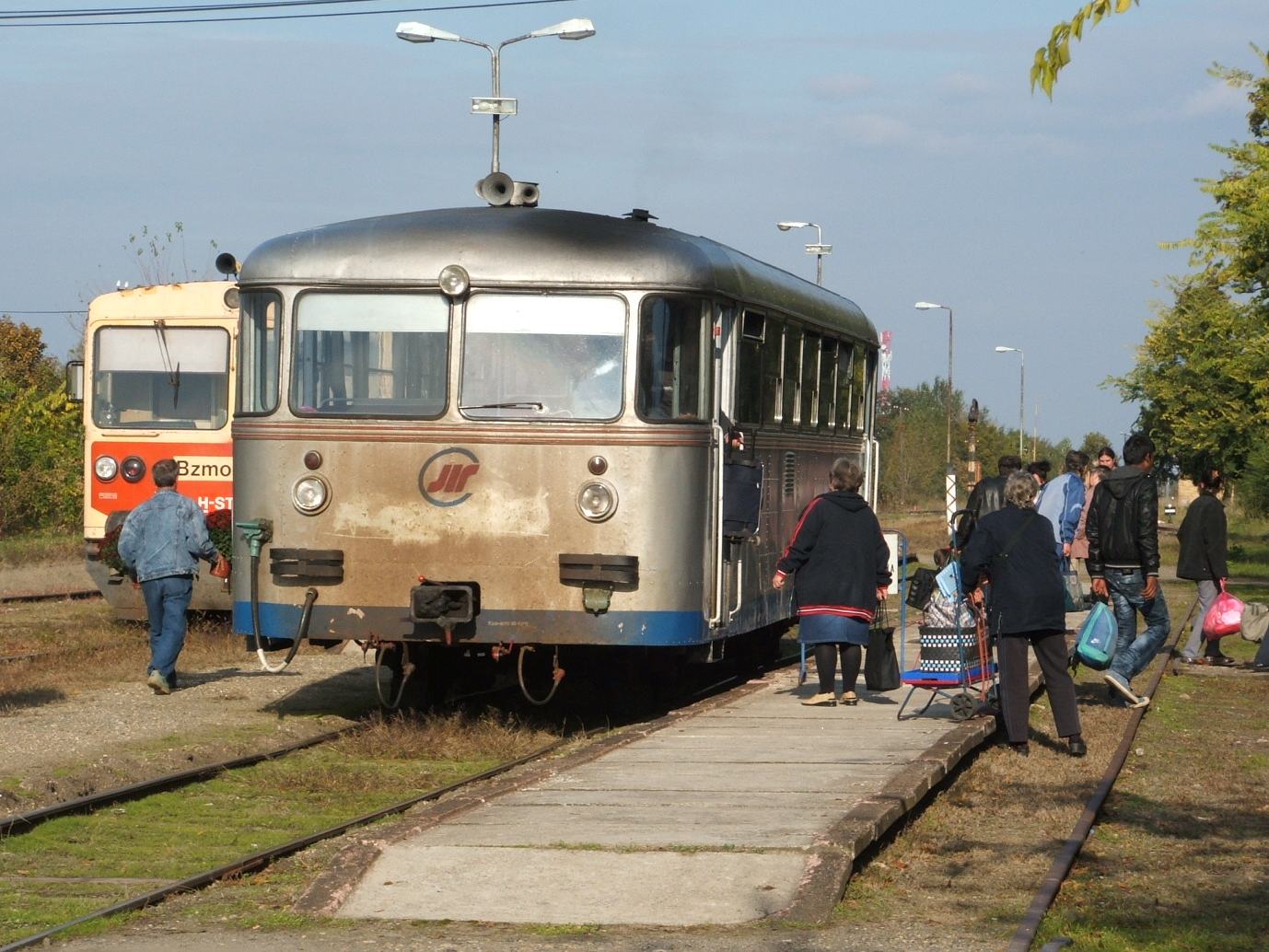
Series 812 railbus at Horgoš station, Serbia

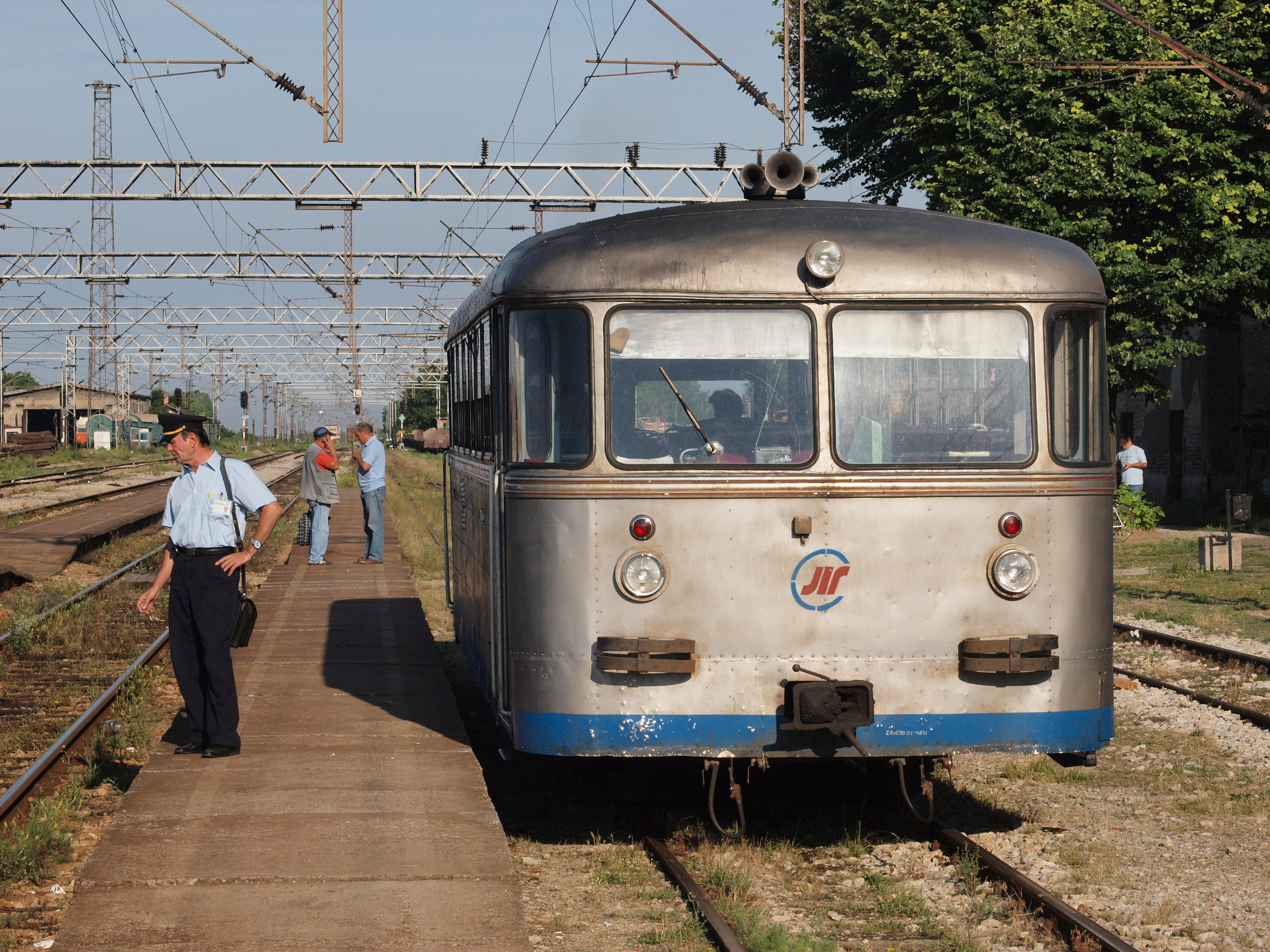
Šinobus on Ruma-Šabac line. Šinobus has been replaced on this line with series 711 DMU.

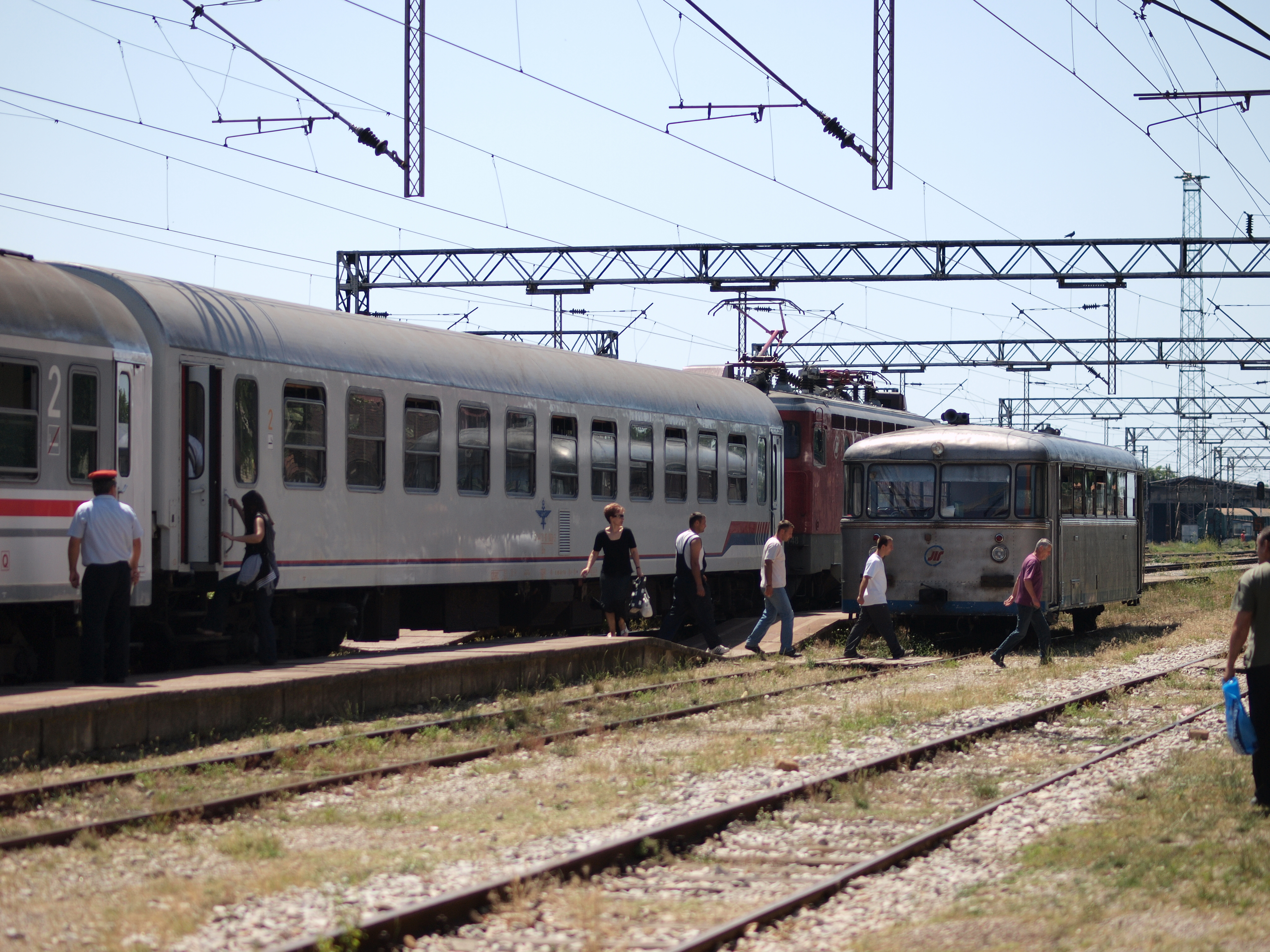
ŽS series 812 next to ŽS series 441 at Ruma

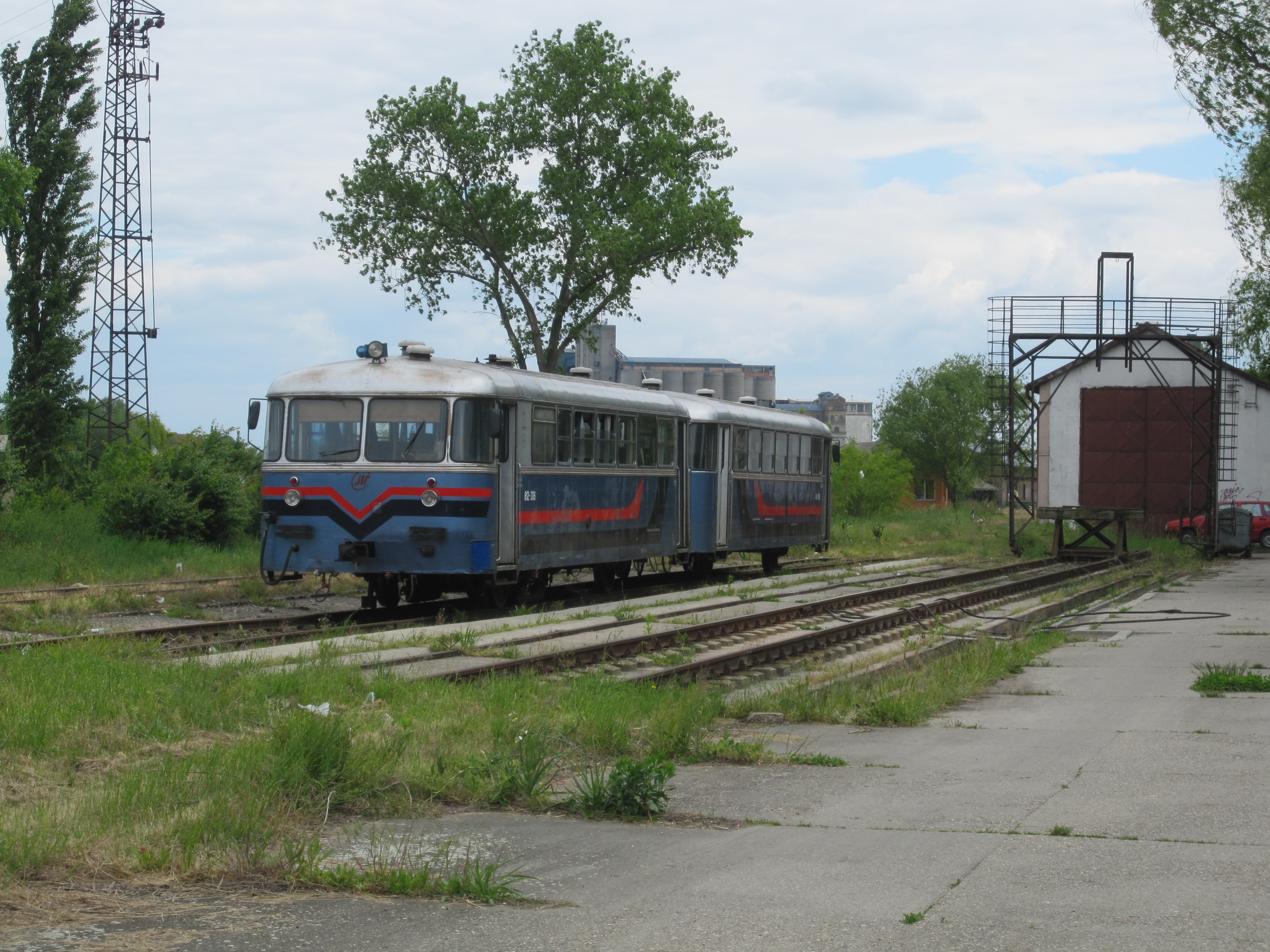
ŽS series 812/816 at Zrenjanin depot
