= Büssing A5P =

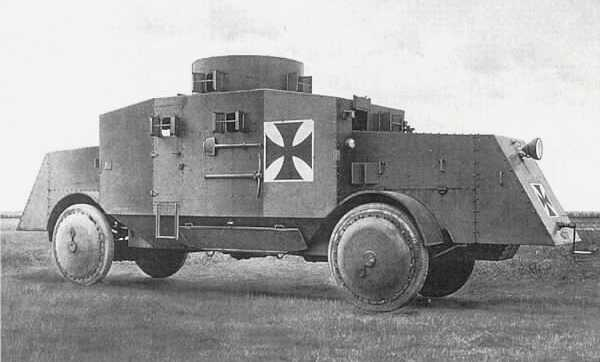
- Type: Armoured car
- Place of origin: Germany

Production history
- Manufacturer: Büssing AG
- Produced: 1914
- No. built: 1

Specifications
- Mass: 10.3 t (23,000 lb)
- Length: 9.5 m (31 ft 2 in)
- Width: 2.1 m (6 ft 11 in)
- Height: 3.5 m (11 ft 6 in)
- Crew: 10
- Armor: 6–9 mm
- Main armament: 3x 7.92 mm MG 08 machine guns
- Engine: 6-cylinder Büssing 'Otto' petrol 90 hp (66 kw)
- Power/weight: 8.7 hp/tonne
- Operational range: 240 kilometres (150 mi)
- Maximum speed: 34 kilometres per hour (21 mph)

The Büssing A5P was an armoured car produced in Germany during World War I.

== History ==
The Büssing company had received its first orders of military vehicles in 1910, producing artillery tractors and supply trailers. By November 1914, the German Army had become aware of the potential of the armoured car by the hit-and-run tactics employed by the Belgians with the Minerva. The Oberste Heeresleitung decided to produce its own armoured vehicle and the manufacturing companies Ehrhardt, Daimler and Büssing were requested to develop an armoured car with all-wheel drive.

During 1915, Büssing delivered the ordered prototype. In contrast to the Belgian armoured cars, the A5P was a massive vehicle, using a 'double-ended' layout that could at least pose a tactically useful high ground clearance. Its powerplant was Büssing's successful 6-cylinder truck engines. It had a large steel armoured body and was crewed by ten men. Six of the crew operated three 7.92 mm machine guns, usually the MG 08 or MG 15nA. Some vehicles even received two Becker 20 mm cannons.

In 1916, the A5P began production. Nevertheless, the German Army considered the Ehrhardt design more effective to fulfil the demanded operational tasks. As a result, only one vehicle was produced. The A5P, together with several other armored cars, served in a column on the Romanian Front in 1916 and on the Russian Front in 1917.
