= Büssing =

German bus and truck manufacturer

Büssing AG
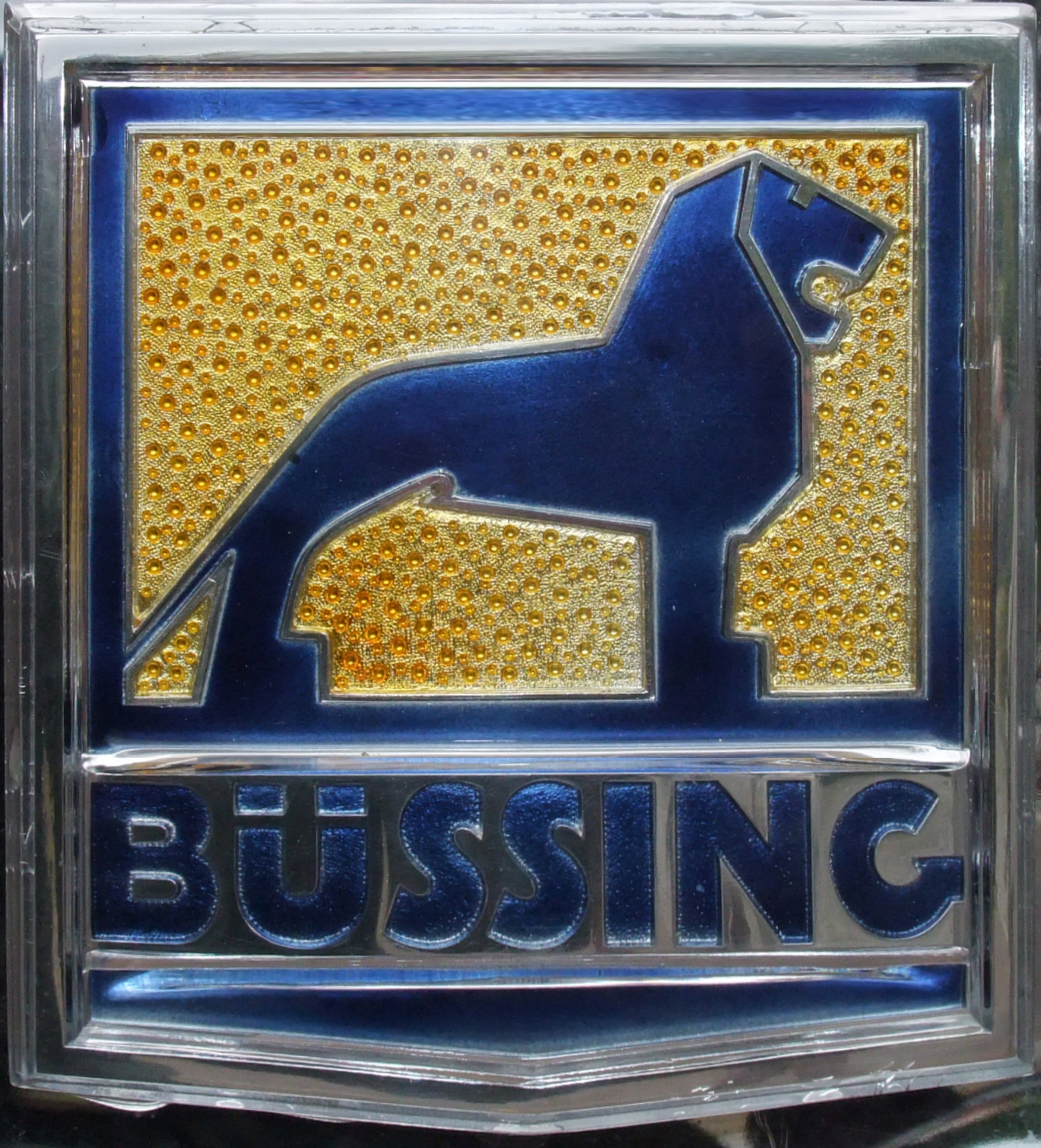
- Industry: Manufacturing
- Founded: 1903
- Defunct: 1971
- Fate: Merged with MAN AG
- Headquarters: Braunschweig, Germany
- Key people: Heinrich Büssing (1843–1929) (founder)
- Products: Trucks and buses

Büssing AG was a German bus and truck manufacturer, established in 1903 by Heinrich Büssing (1843–1929) in Braunschweig. It quickly evolved to one of the largest European producers, whose utility vehicles with the Brunswick Lion emblem were widely distributed, especially from the 1930s onwards. The company was taken over by MAN AG in 1971.

== Heinrich Büssing ==
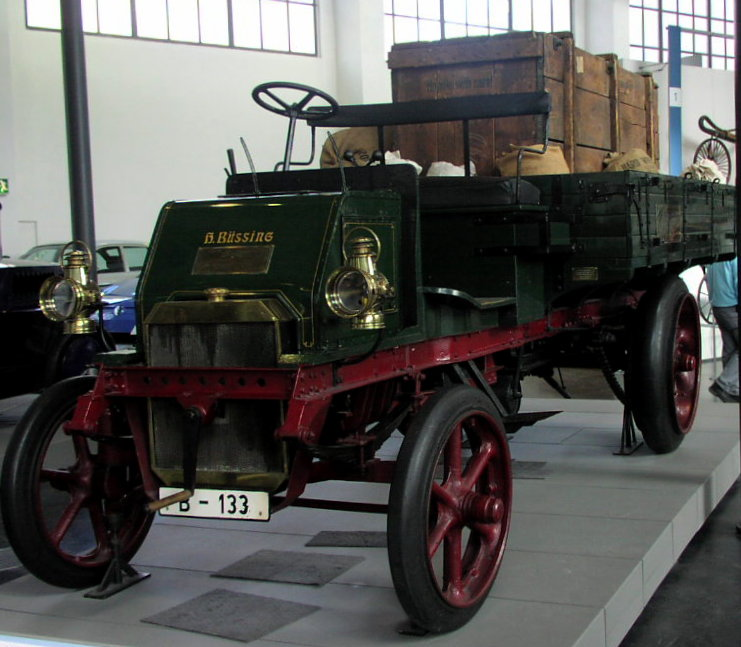
1903 Büssing ZU-550 truck on display in the Deutsches Museum, Munich

Heinrich Büssing successfully founded several companies and held approximately 250 patents. One example is an introductory patent by engineer C. Windhausen and Heinrich Büssing from Braunschweig, which relates to the manufacture of new chimney caps. At the age of 60, the inventor and businessman Heinrich Büssing together with his two sons founded the Heinrich-Büssing-Spezialfabrik für Motorwagen und Motoromnibusse. Büssing, the son of a blacksmith dynasty at Nordsteimke (in present-day Wolfsburg), had studied engineering at the Collegium Carolinum in Braunschweig and had founded several bicycle, engineering and railway signal works with varying degrees of success. His first truck was a 2-ton payload machine powered by a 2-cylinder gasoline engine and featuring worm drive. That successful design was later built under license by other companies in Germany, Austria, Hungary and by Straker-Squire in England.

One year later he debuted a first 20 HP omnibus model carrying up to twelve passengerson the route from Braunschweig to Wendeburg, operated by his own Automobil-Omnibus-Betriebs-Gesellschaft. Büssing busses soon served public transport in European cities like Berlin (ABOAG), Vienna and Prague (Fross–Büssing), or London.

== History ==
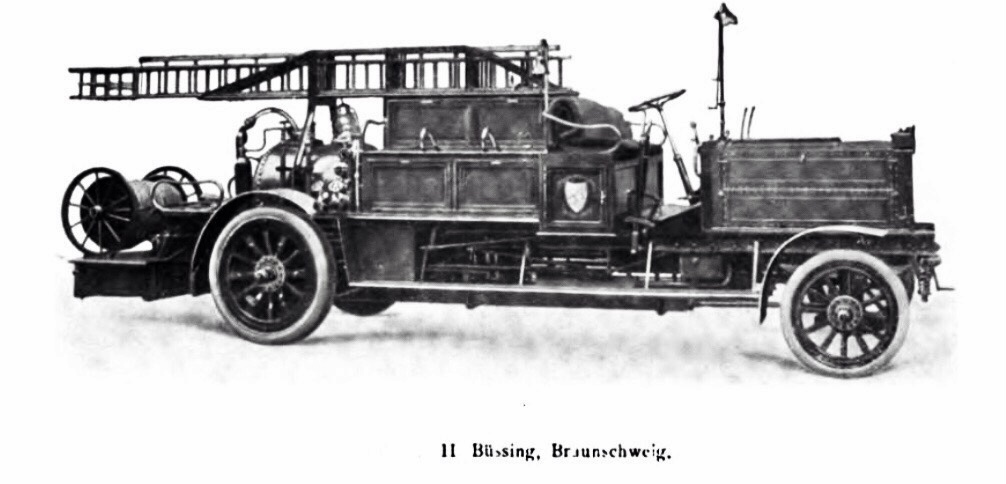
Büssing Typ II (1907-1916)

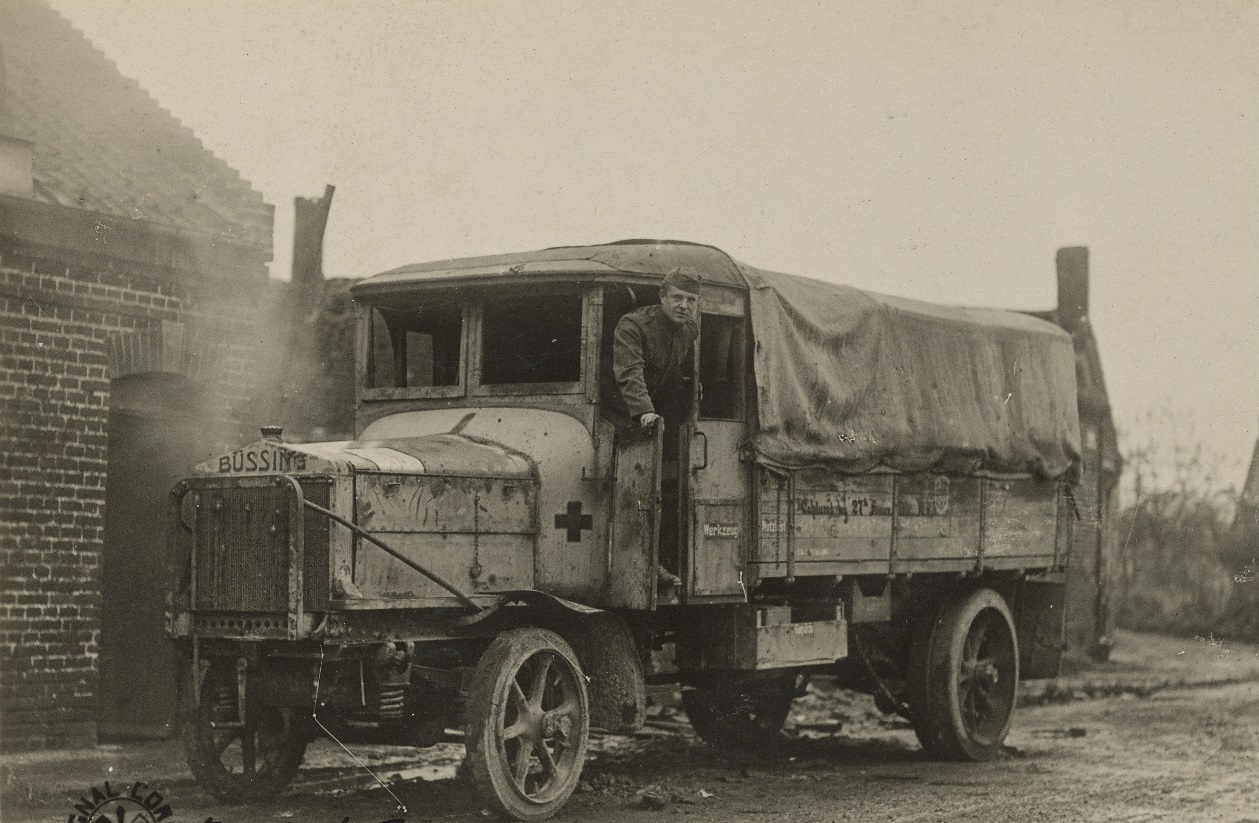
Büssing 5t army truck in 1918

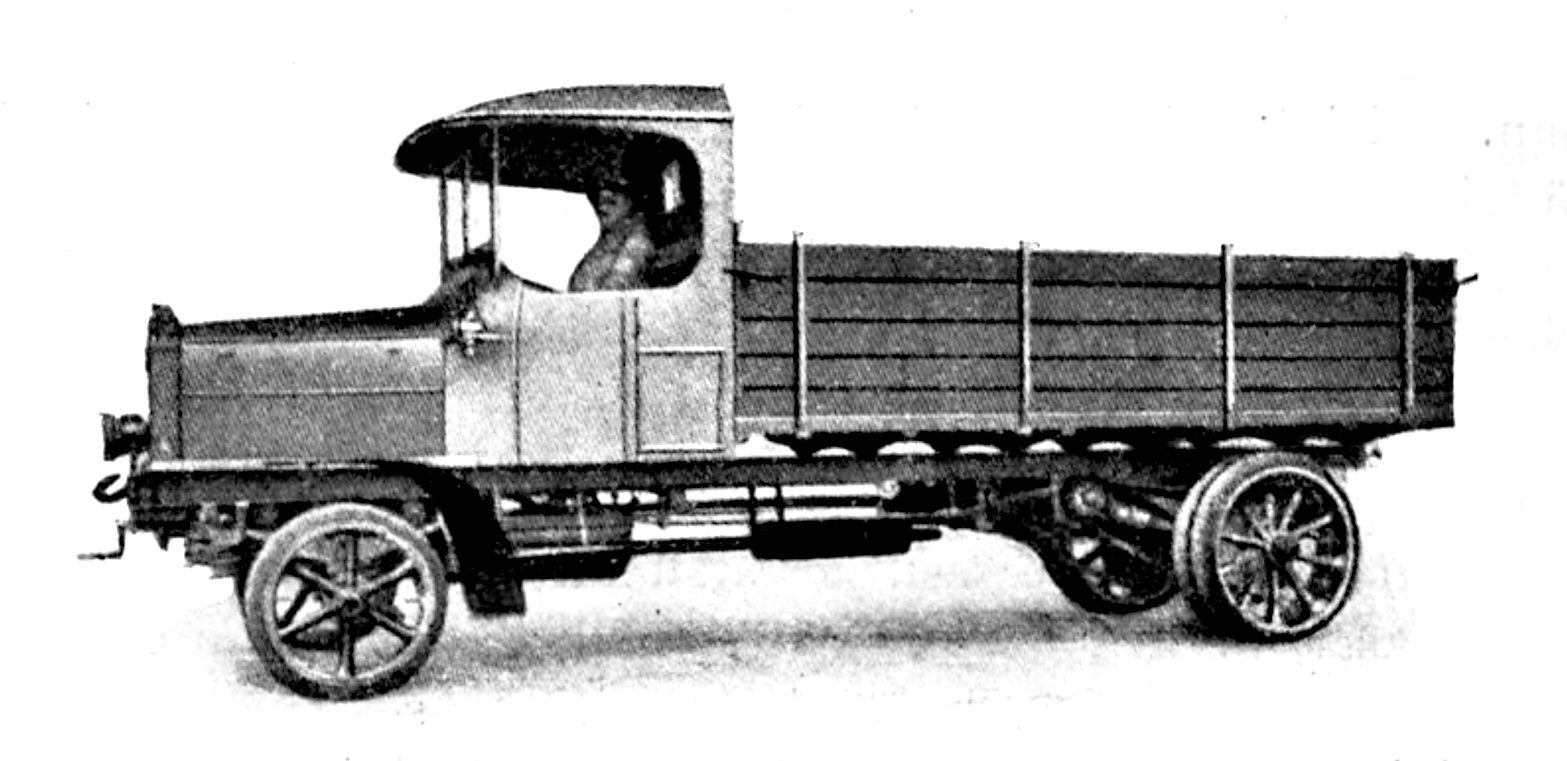
Büssing V 5t Truck 1921

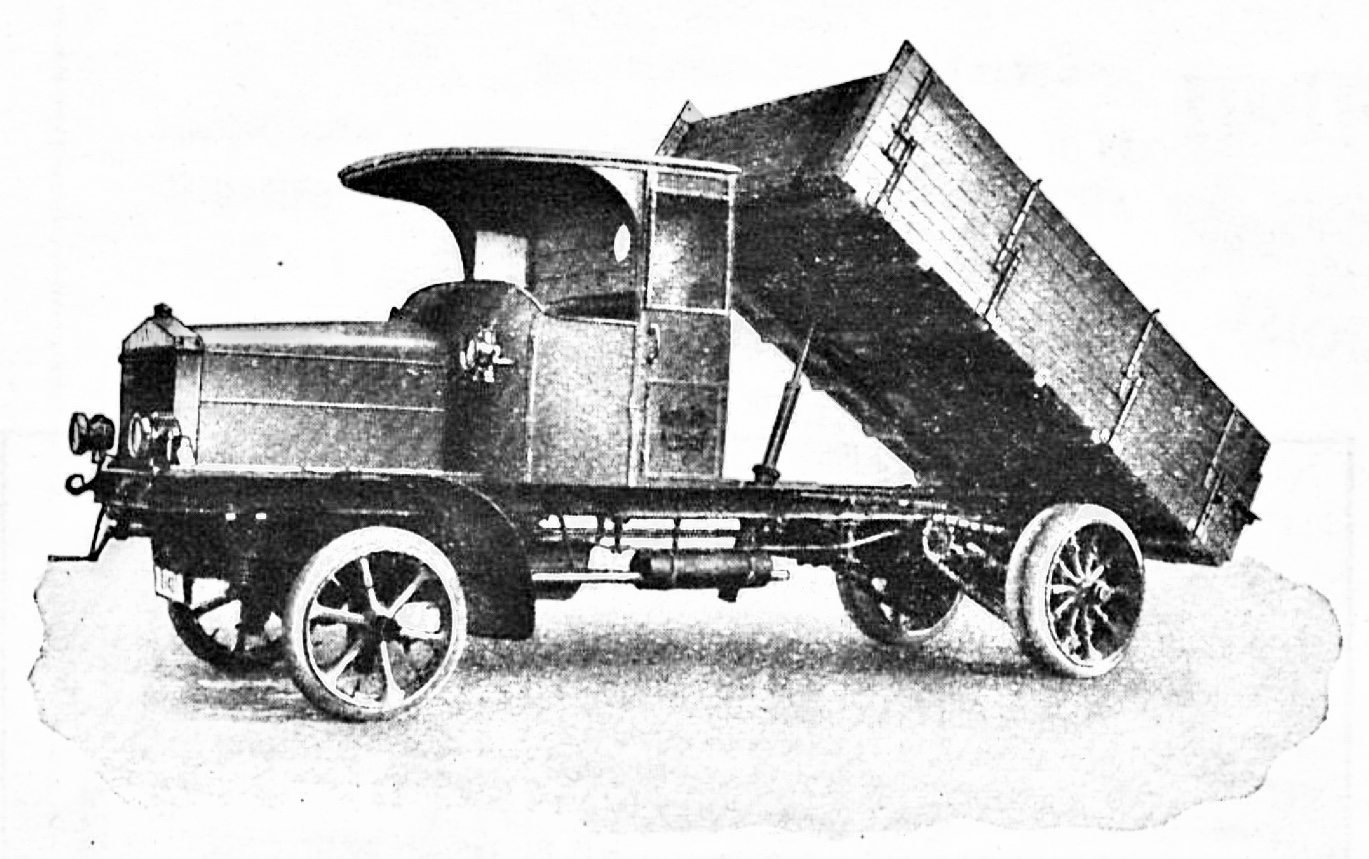
Büssing III 3,5t Truck 1921

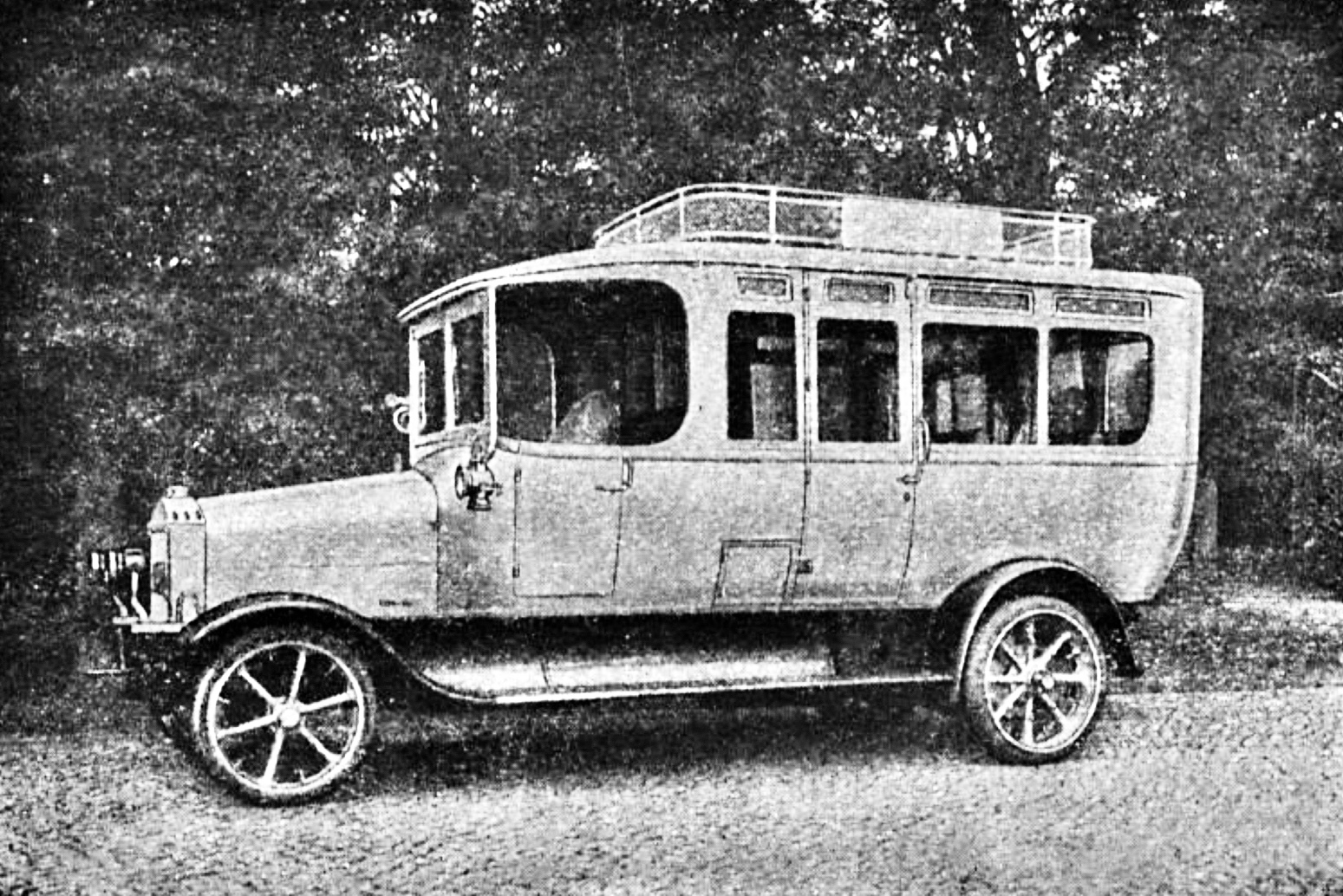
Büssing Omnibus (1921)

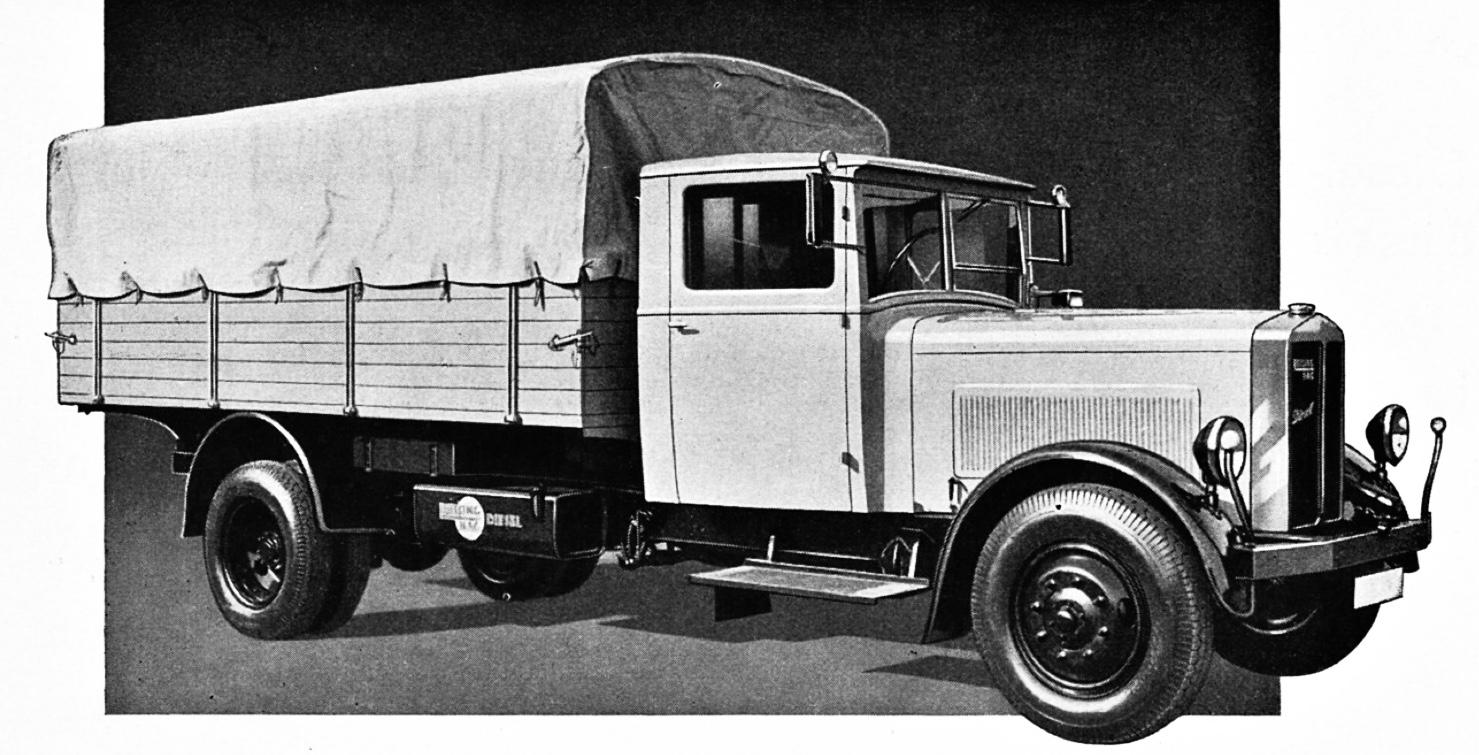
Büssing 350 (1933-1936).

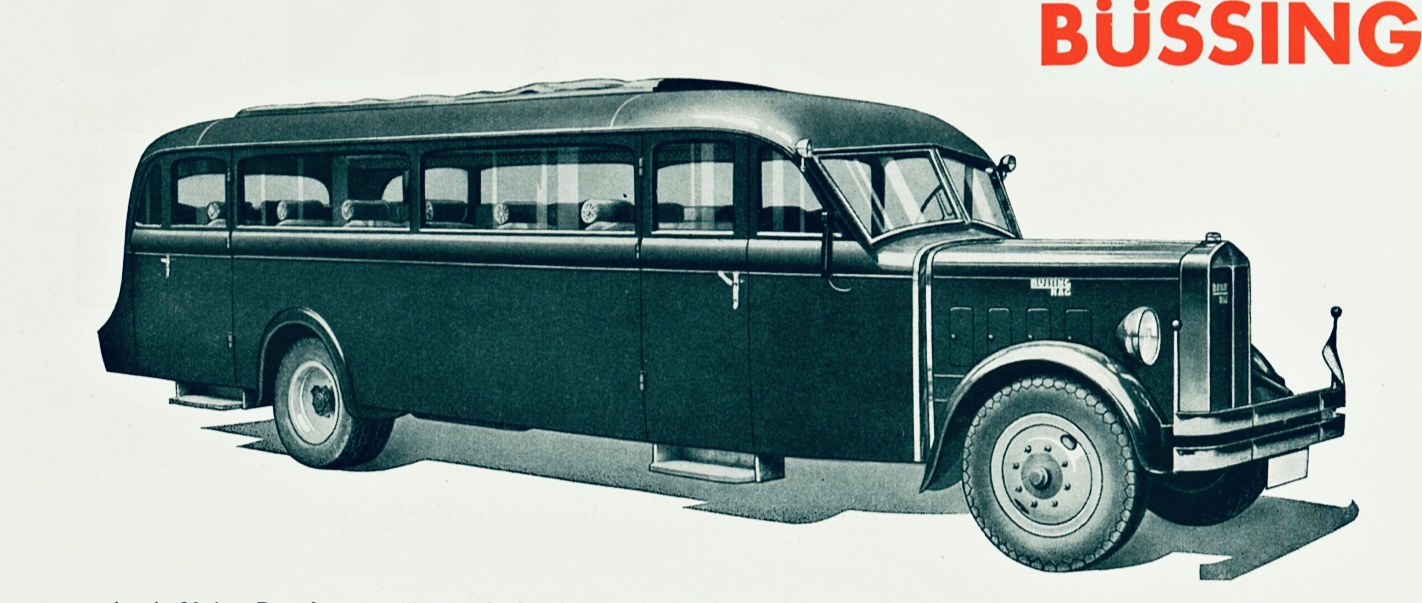
Büssing 350-O (1933-1936)

Before World War I Büssing started to build heavy-duty trucks for the time. These trucks featured 4- and 6-cylinder engines (5 tonnes and 11 tonnes, respectively). In 1914 the Büssing A5P armored car was developed at the behest of the German Oberste Heeresleitung. After the war, Heinrich Büssing had to enter a Kommanditgesellschaft limited partnership, converted into the Büssing AG joint-stock company in 1922. In 1923, Büssing introduced the first rigid three-axle chassis which was used in upcoming models and allowed Büssing to lead the market share in Germany in commercial vehicles. Fleets of their double and single deck buses ran on the streets of Berlin and were a common sight in the interwar years.

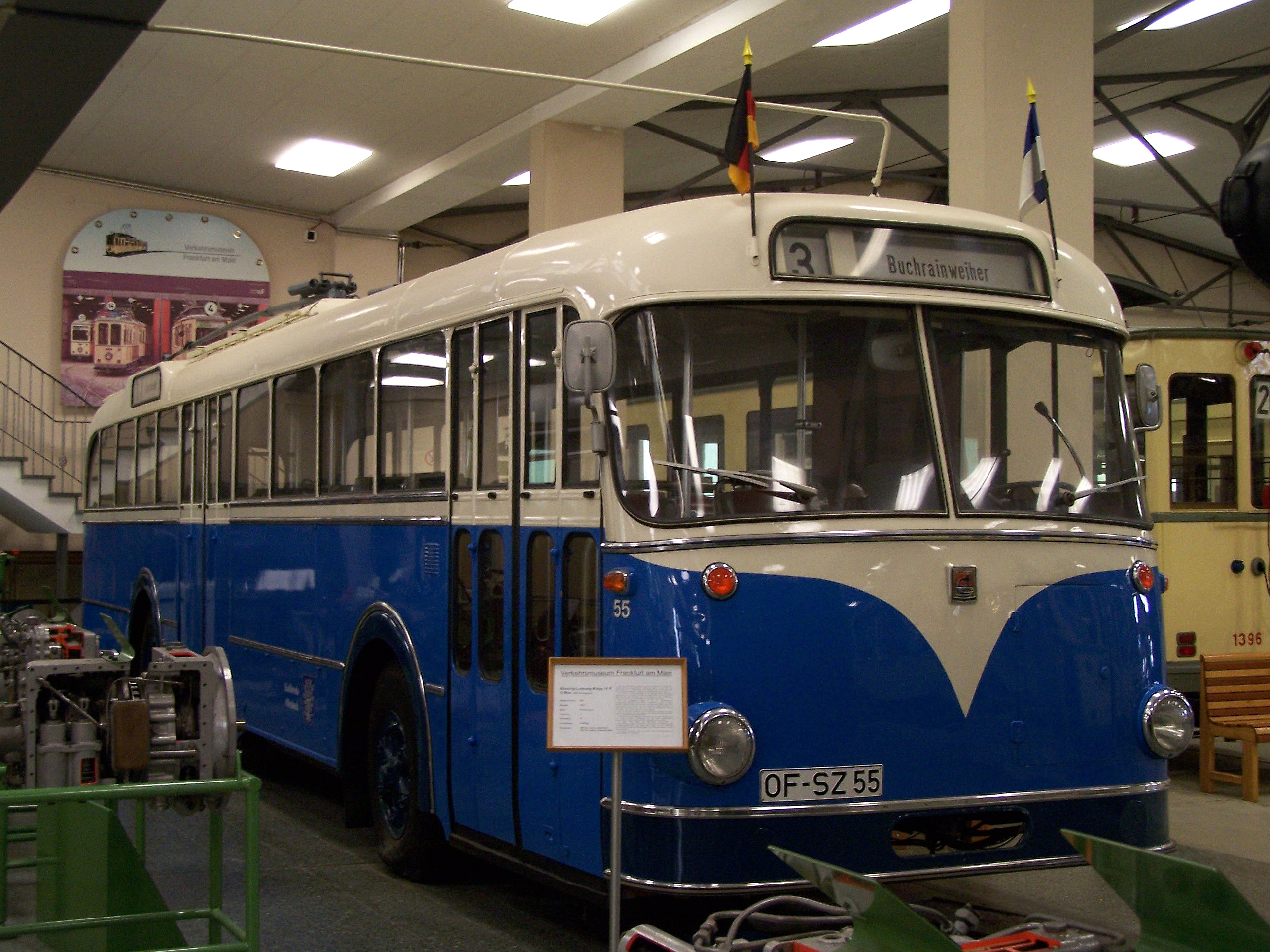
1963/1964 Büssing trolleybus preserved at the Frankfurt-am-Main Transport Museum

Büssing NAG used inmates of several Nazi concentration camps in Braunschweig from 1944 to March 1945 for slave labor. These camps were subcamps to the Neuengamme concentration camp.

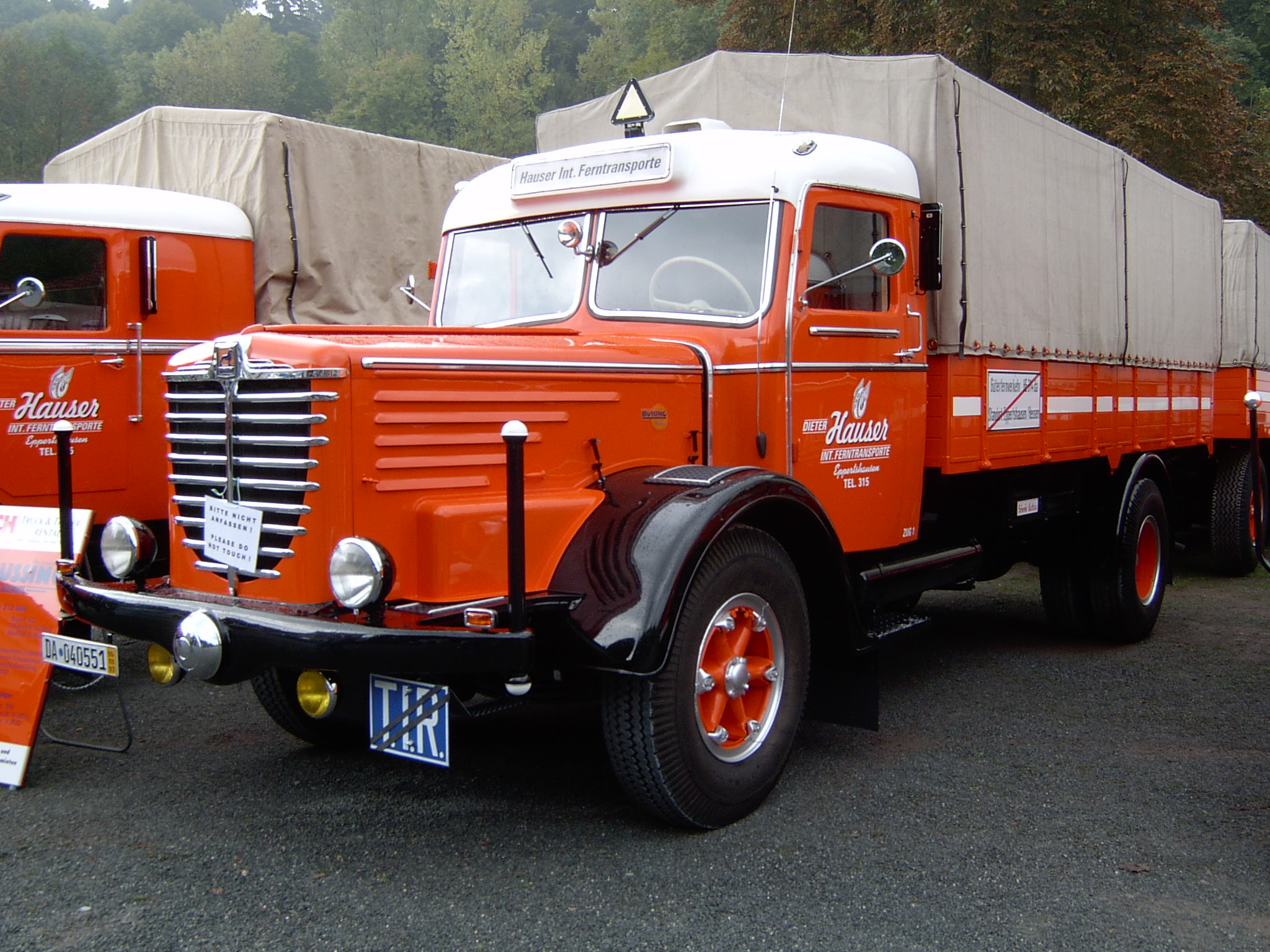
Büssing 8000 truck

After World War II civilian production resumed with 5-ton and 7-ton trucks being produced. In 1950, the company name became Büssing Nutzkraftwagen GmbH and production was concentrated on underfloor-engined trucks which were to become the firm's specialty. Most tractor units and all normal-control trucks had vertical engines, but in the mid 1960s there was a version of their Commodore maximum-weight tractor unit, the 16-210, which had a horizontal diesel mounted under the cab ahead of the front axle, the gearbox being mounted halfway along the truck's chassis.

In 1969, Büssing started strong ties with MAN AG. MAN was a customer to some Büssing's innovative trucks and parts while they were promoting their own line-up. In 1971, an MAN takeover of Büssing was announced. MAN started to use the lion logo on its newly named "MAN-Büssing" trucks. Büssing's unique underfloor-engined truck range continued in production under the MAN AG through to the late 1980s.

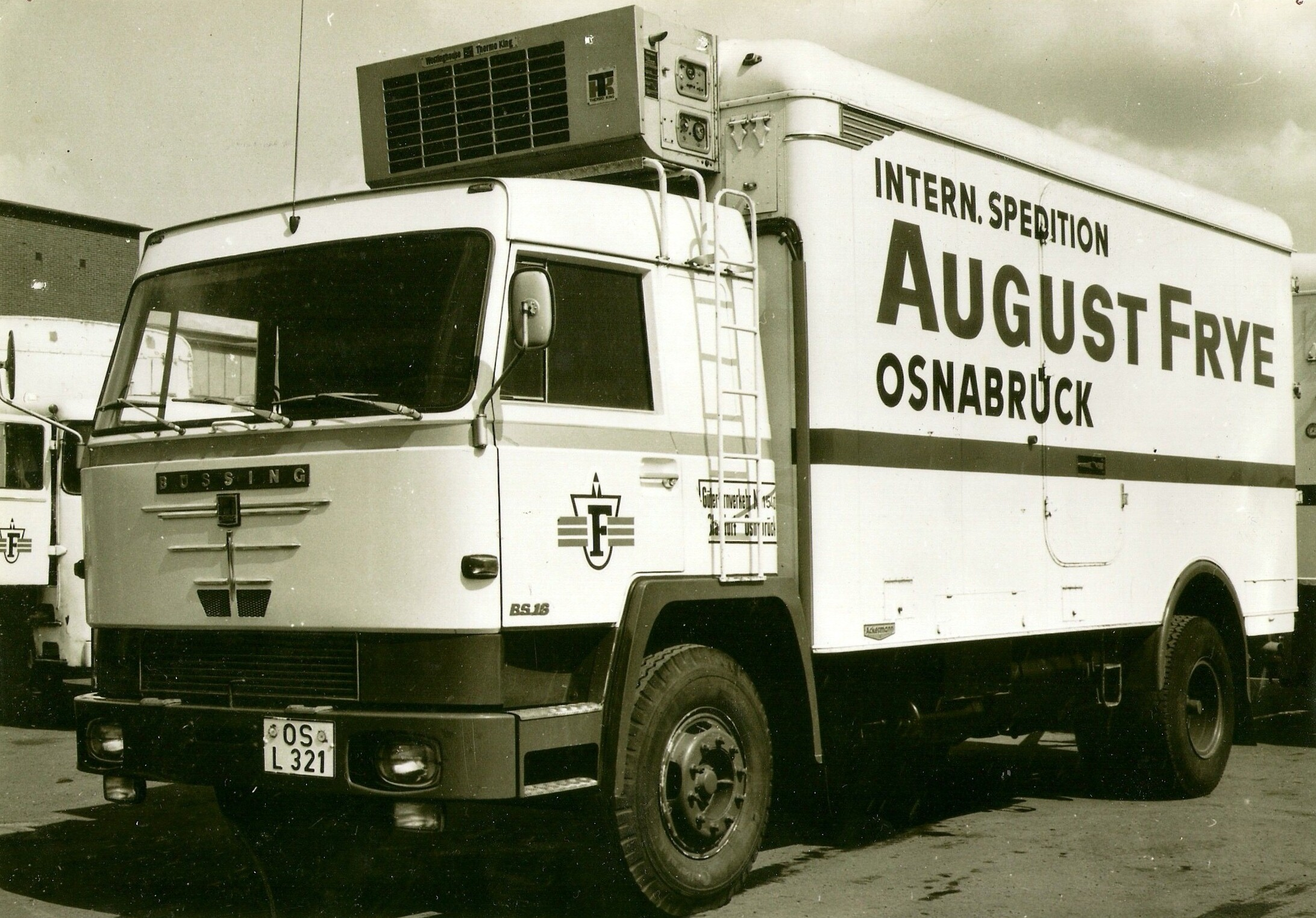
Büssing BS 16 from 1967

=== Acquisitions ===
- First acquisition for Büssing was Mannesmann-Mulag Motoren und Lastwagen AG of Aachen.
- Elbing plant of Automobil Fabrik Komnick AG.
- In 1934, Neue Automobil Gesellschaft (NAG). After the takeover Büssing used the brand Büssing-NAG until 1950.
- Büssing took over the Borgward plant at Osterholz-Scharmbeck in 1962. This plant was used for building military 4-tonne 4x4. (1968 Factory was sold to Faun-Werke GmbH.)

=== Innovations ===
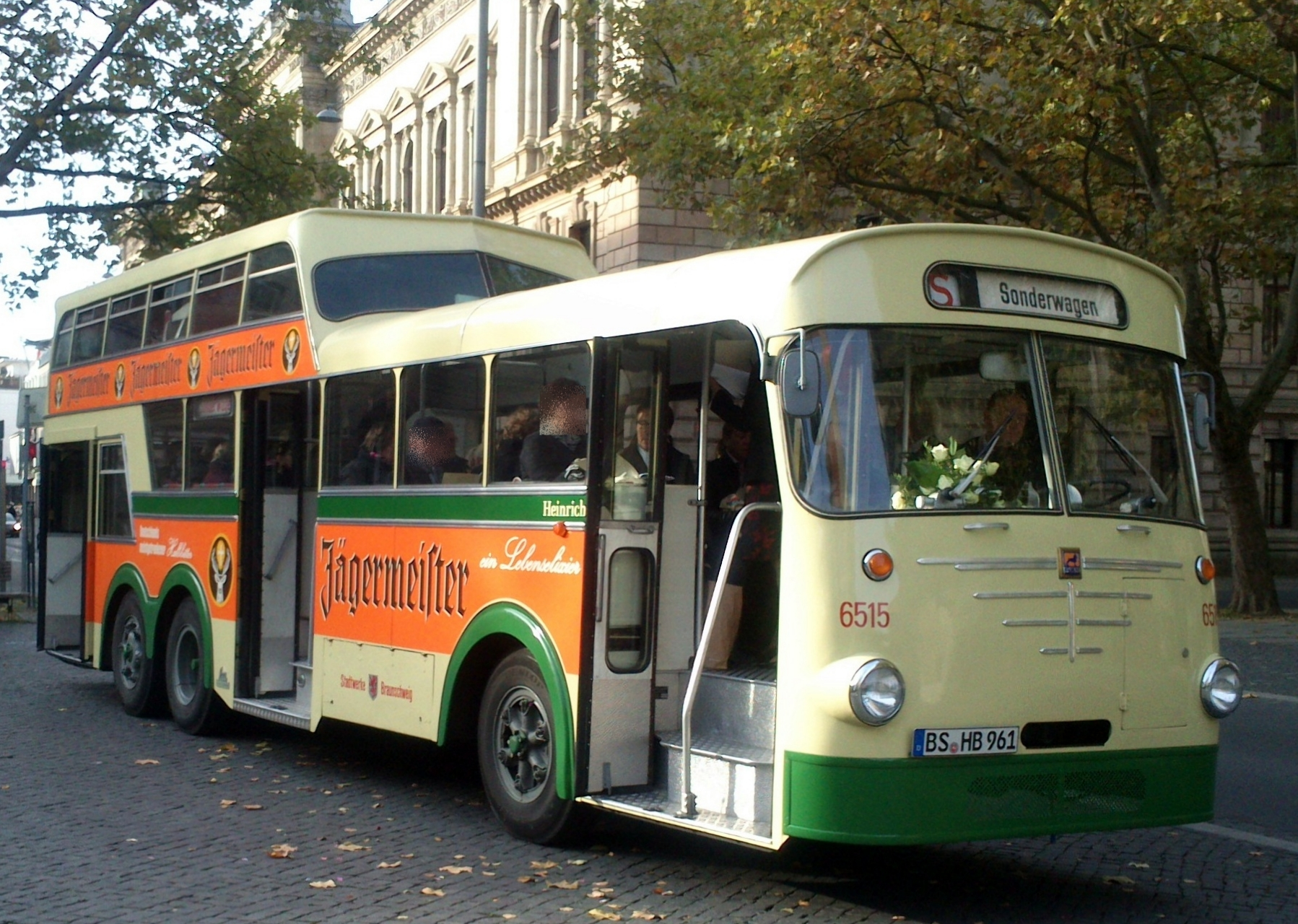
Büssing one and a half decker from 1965

- 1923: The Büssing III GL 6 is the world's first full-size bus
- 1930s: Büssing began building heavy duty trucks with diesel engines
- 1936: Büssing pioneered the horizontal "underfloor" diesel engines
- During World War II Büssing once again supplied military vehicles including 6x4 armoured cars and an 8x8 with all-wheel steering.

=== Trolleybus production ===
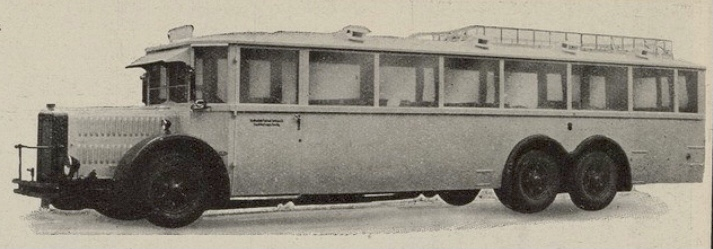
Büssing Omnibus, type VI

Büssing manufactured trolleybuses between 1933 and 1966, producing approximately 71 vehicles – not counting 21 Büssing motorbuses that were converted into trolleybuses later. Most were for German cities, but production also included three trolleybuses for Chernyakhovsk, Russia, in 1939; four for Copenhagen, Denmark, in 1940–42; and 14 for Lucerne, Switzerland, in 1965. In Turkey, ESHOT converted 21 Büssing motorbuses into trolleybuses in 1962 and 1968. At least four Büssing trolleybuses have been preserved, including ones at the Frankfurt Transport Museum, (de:Verkehrsmuseum Frankfurt am Main) at the Hannoversches Straßenbahn-Museum and at the Historama transport museum in Ferlach, Austria.

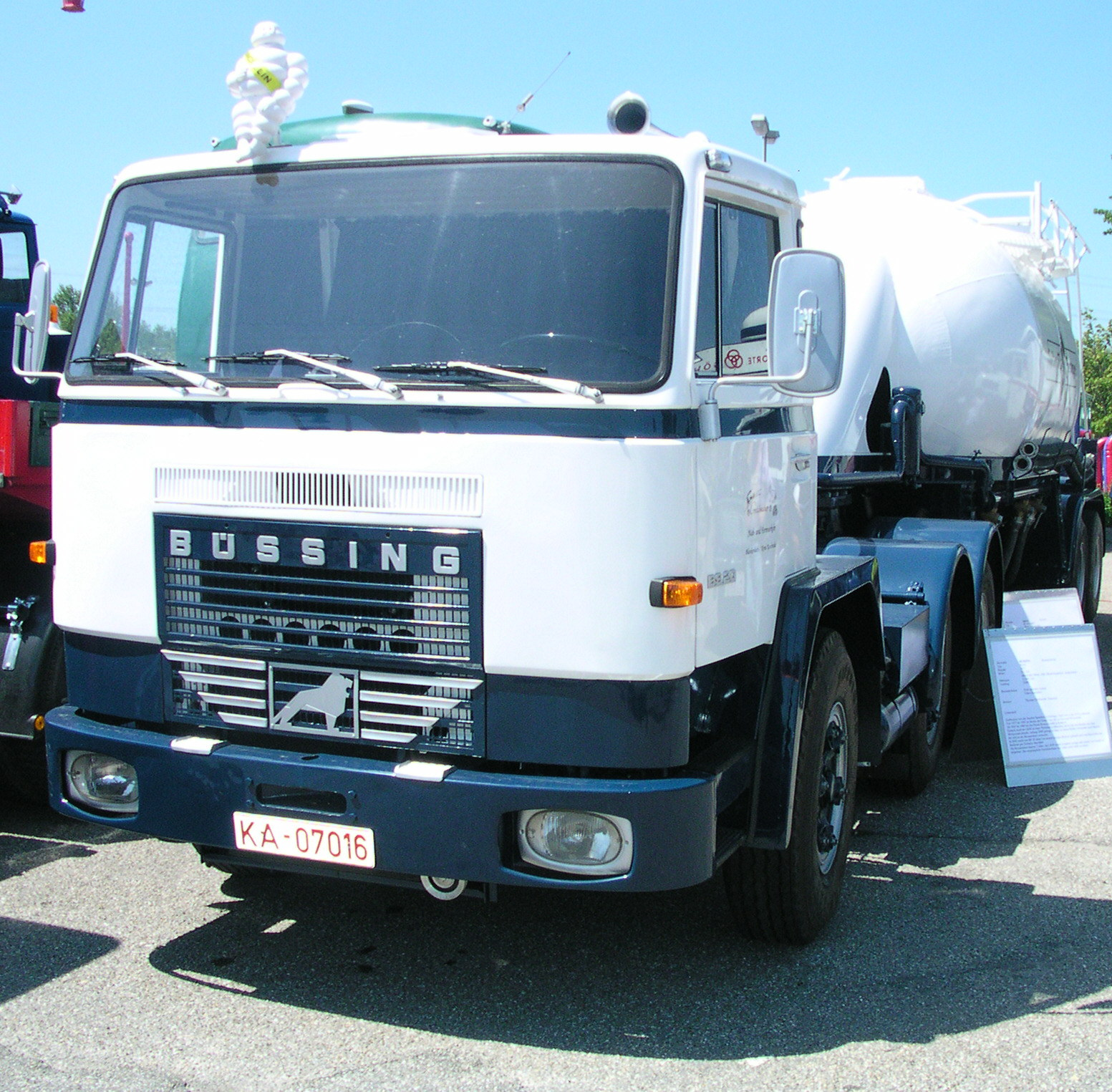
Büssing BS 20

=== Omnibus ===
From 1933, the buses 250-O, 275-ON, 300-O, 305-O, and 350-O were produced. By the end of 1938, these types were replaced by successors.

- The 250-O, available since the beginning of 1934, was designed for 20 passengers. The empty weight was 2150 kg. The permissible total weight was 5350 kg. The four-cylinder diesel engine had a displacement of 4941 cc with a bore of 110 mm and a stroke of 130 mm. The maximum power of 68 hp was available at 2000 revolutions per minute.
- The 275-ON available since the beginning of 1933, was designed for 26 passengers. The empty weight was 2500 kg. The permissible total weight was 6200 kg. The four-cylinder diesel engine had a displacement of 4941 cc with a bore of 110 mm and a stroke of 130 mm. The maximum power of 68 hp was available at 2000 revolutions per minute.
- The 300-O available since the beginning of 1933, was designed for 30 passengers. The empty weight was 2625 kg. The permissible total weight was 6950 kg. The four-cylinder diesel engine had a displacement of 4941 cc with a bore of 110 mm and a stroke of 130 mm. The maximum power of 68 hp was available at 2000 revolutions per minute.
- The 305-O available since the beginning of 1933, was designed for 30 passengers. The empty weight was 2700 kg. The permissible total weight was 7100 kg. The five-cylinder diesel engine had a displacement of 6177 cc with a bore of 110 mm and a stroke of 130 mm. The maximum power of 75 hp was available at 2000 revolutions per minute.
- The 350-O available since the beginning of 1933, was designed for 36 passengers. The empty weight was 3500 kg. The permissible total weight was 8200 kg. The six-cylinder diesel engine had a displacement of 7413 cc with a bore of 110 mm and a stroke of 130 mm. The maximum power of 90 hp was available at 2000 revolutions per minute.
- The city line bus 275-N was designed for more passengers compared to the intercity bus 275-ON. 30 people could board the bus with an empty weight of 2600 kg. The permissible total weight was 6900 kg. The four-cylinder diesel engine had a reduced power of 65 hp in favor of an improved torque curve for urban areas.
- The city line bus 305-N was designed for more passengers compared to the intercity bus 305-O. 34 people could board the bus with an empty weight of 2800 kg. The permissible total weight was 7700 kg. The five-cylinder diesel engine had a power of 75 hp.
- The city line bus 350-N was designed for more passengers compared to the intercity bus 350-O. 38 people could board the bus with an empty weight of 3700 kg. The permissible total weight was 8900 kg. The six-cylinder diesel engine had a power of 90 hp.

=== Truck ===
- The Büssing 200 was a truck with a payload capacity of 2.2 tons. The empty weight was 1650 kg. The allowable total weight was 4600 kg. The three-cylinder diesel engine had a displacement of 3706 cc with a bore of 110 mm and a stroke of 130 mm. The maximum power of 45 hp was achieved at 2000 revolutions per minute. The vehicle was produced from 1933 to 1939.
- The Büssing 250 was a truck with a payload capacity of 2.5 tons. The empty weight was 2150 kg. The allowable total weight was 5350 kg. The four-cylinder diesel engine had a displacement of 4941 cc with a bore of 110 mm and a stroke of 130 mm. The maximum power of 65 hp was achieved at 2000 revolutions per minute. The vehicle was produced from 1934 to 1936.
- The Büssing 275 was a truck with a payload capacity of 3.2 tons. The empty weight was 2300 kg. The allowable total weight was 6200 kg. The four-cylinder diesel engine had a displacement of 4941 cc with a bore of 110 mm and a stroke of 130 mm. The maximum power of 65 hp was achieved at 2000 revolutions per minute. The vehicle was produced from 1933 to 1939.
- The Büssing 305 was a truck with a payload capacity of 3.8 tons. The empty weight was 2600 kg. The allowable total weight was 7100 kg. The five-cylinder diesel engine had a displacement of 6177 cc with a bore of 110 mm and a stroke of 130 mm. The maximum power of 75 hp was achieved at 2000 revolutions per minute. The vehicle was produced from 1935 to 1938.

=== Railway ===
The WEG T36 was a two-axle diesel railcar manufactured by the Fuchs wagon factory. It was based on a Büssing bus. It was powered by two Büssing U10 engines, each with 150 hp. The vehicle had 42 seats and a top speed of 65 km/h. It was put into service by the Württemberg Railway Company (WEG) in 1954 and operated on the meter-gauge Amstetten–Laichingen line until 1973.

== Overview of production figures ==
Year	Production
1945	1032
1946	1507
1947	908
1948	1421
1949	2023
1950	1541
1951	1689
1952	1676
1953	1779
1954	1510
1955	1683
1956	1719
1957	1095
1958	912
1959	1338
1960	2041
1961	2222
1962	2775
1963	2181
1964	2401
1965	2476
1966	1922
1967	1476
1968	2110
1969	2364
1970	3511
1971	3064
Sum	50376

== See also ==
- Borgward
- Magirus
- MAN SE
- Henschel
- Neue Automobil Gesellschaft

== Notes ==
- Büssing Buses and coaches registered in Luxembourg 1960
- Büssing Buses and coaches registered in Luxembourg 1967
- Büssing Buses and coaches registered in Luxembourg 1975
- Büssing Tractors in Luxembourg 1975
