= Goša FOM =

Rolling stock manufacturer

Coordinates: 44°21′30.7″N 20°57′48.5″E

- Official logo
- Native name: Гоша ФОМ
- Type: Joint-stock company
- Industry: Rail vehicle manufacturer
- Founded: 29 January 1999; 27 years ago (Current form); 1923; 103 years ago (Founded)
- Successor: Bombardier Transportation
- Headquarters: Industrijska 70, Smederevska Palanka, Serbia
- Area served: Serbia
- Key people: Srdan Dimitrijević (General director)
- Services: Manufacturing, maintenance and overhaul
- Revenue: ▲€52.05 million (2018)
- Net income: ▲€0.29 million (2018)
- Total assets: ▼€35.83 million (2018)
- Total equity: ▼€12.49 million (2018)
- Owner: Kemerevo d.o.o. (18.73%); Matira d.o.o. (18.54%); Jasenica 1923 (18.28%); Ajboh d.o.o. (17.45%); Breizal Management Ltd. (10.64%); Others
- Number of employees: 816 (2018)
- Website: www.gosafom.com

Goša FOM (Serbian Cyrillic: Гоша ФОМ; full legal name: Goša Fabrika Opreme i Mašina, Serbian Cyrillic: Гоша Фабрика Опреме и Машина) is a Serbian rail vehicle and equipment manufacturer, based in Smederevska Palanka, Serbia.

== History ==
Goša FOM was founded in 1923 in Smederevska Palanka, Kingdom of Serbs, Croats and Slovenes.

Company GOŠA originally AD JASENICA founded in 1923 by French and Serbian capital shares for production and repair of railway cars and steel structures.

The year of 1930 is considered as foundation year of GOŠA FOM A.D. in terms of it is today when they initiated the shop for manufacture of steel structures, cranes, iron bridges and other structures.

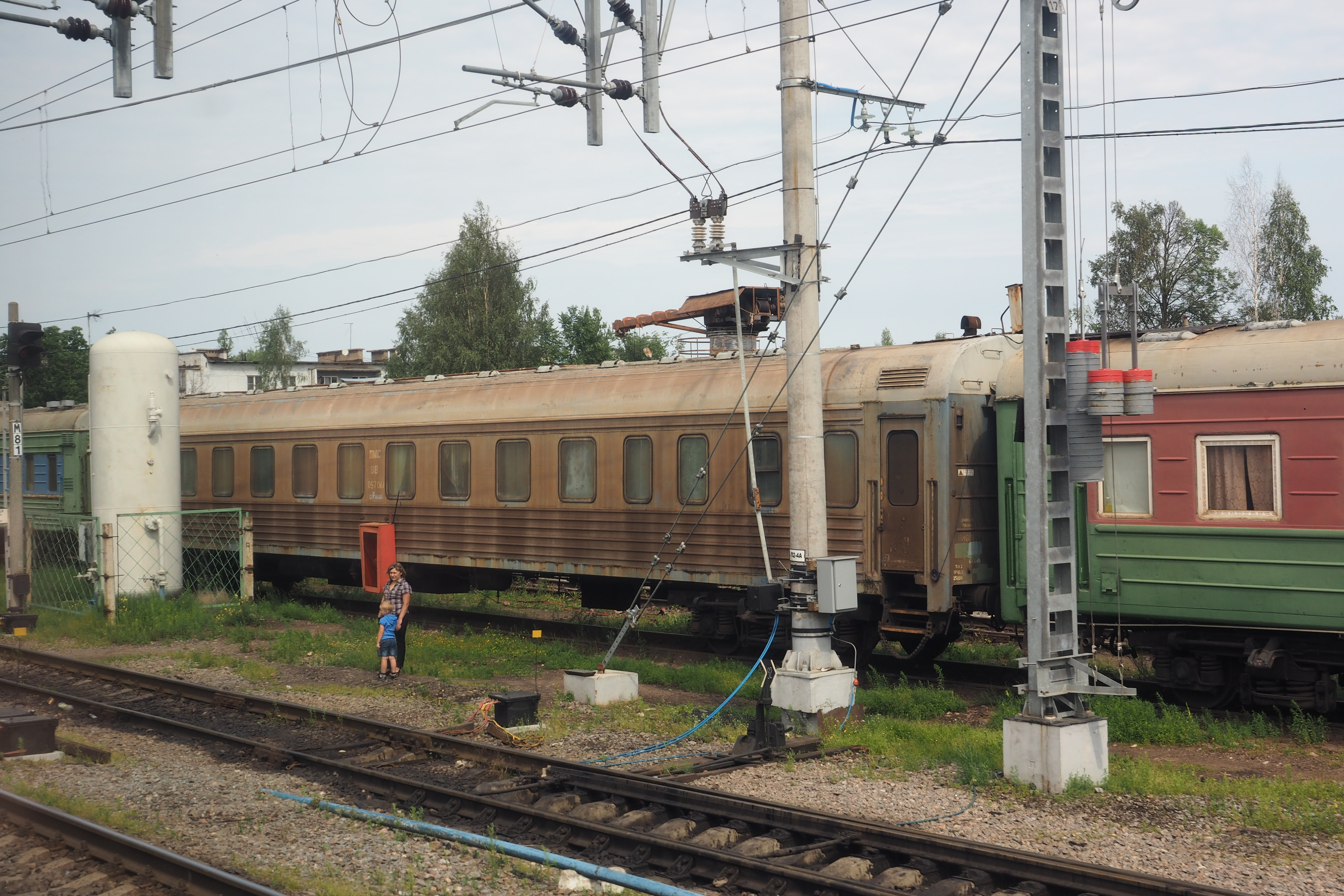
GOŠA railway stainless steel car for Soviet railways from 1980s

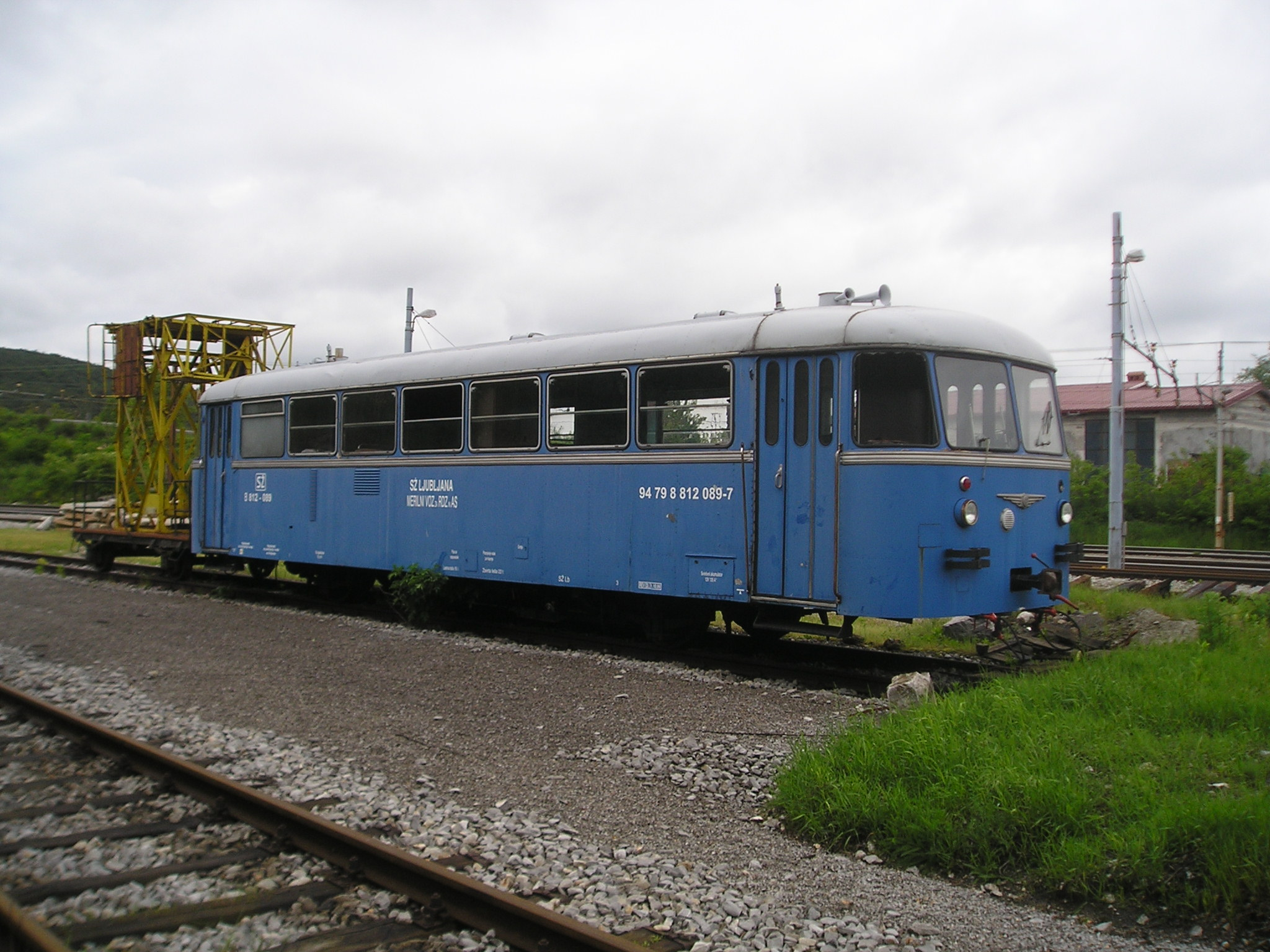
812/818

The 1950 - 1960 period was characterized by production of steel structures for various applications, cranes, tanks and power generating equipment.

In the middle of seventies in the production program have been included coke and metallurgical equipment production and at the beginning of eighties they started with production of open and ground pit mining equipment and gearboxes.

Gosa Fom have established technical relationships with German companies Takraf and Eickhoff have been taken the production of mining equipment and gearboxes and considerable cooperation with European companies in scope of energy, metallurgy and mining industry.

Production plan of the firm involves the manufacture of heavy industrial equipment such as power generating sets, coke metallurgical equipment, mining gearboxes, cranes, processing equipment, steel structures, and bridges.

Policy of openness to the every form of cooperation with European and world companies including mutual investment remains as the one of strategic orientation of the company in the future period GOŠA FOM History

== See also ==
- Transport in Serbia
- List of companies of the Socialist Federal Republic of Yugoslavia
