= Falls–Gefrees railway =

Former railway line in Germany

Falls–Gefrees

Overview
- Line number: 5005

Service
- Route number: 817

Technical
- Line length: 5.3 km (3.3 mi)
- Track gauge: 1,435 mm (4 ft 8 1/2 in)
- Minimum radius: 200 m (656 ft)
- Maximum incline: 2.33 %

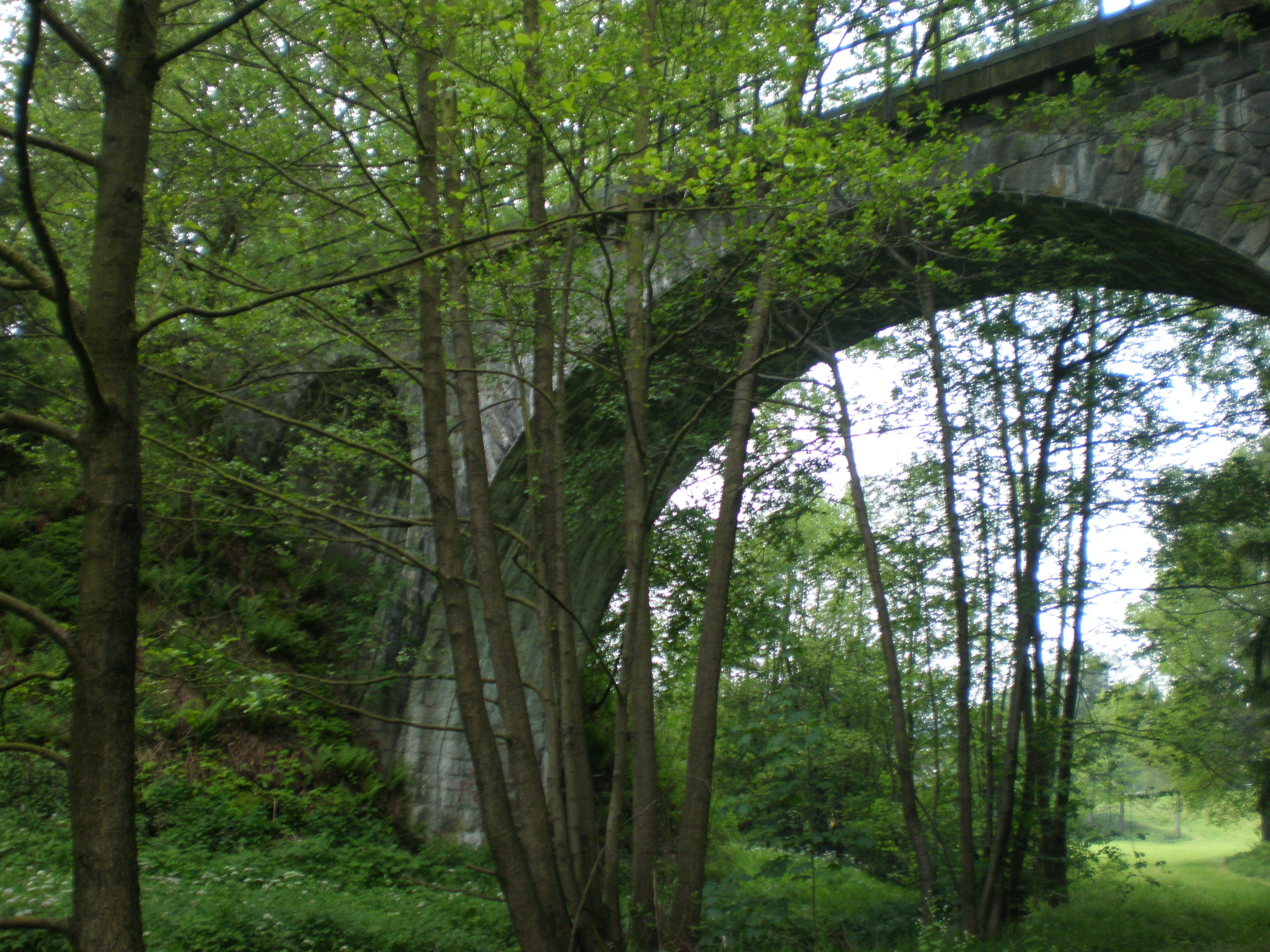
The Ölschnitztal Viaduct of the former Falls-Gefrees local railway

The Falls–Gefrees railway was a German branch line spur in the Fichtel Mountains region of Upper Franconia in northern Bavaria. It ran through an area that is now within the jurisdiction of the town of Gefrees.

== History ==
The railway line was built in 1901 under the direction of the Royal Bavarian State Railways and its official opening ceremony took place on 5 July 1902. Traffic on this state railway line was light; only one train shuttled back and forth. Until the 1950s trains were hauled by steam locomotives, then diesel traction took over. Due to the low numbers of passengers, a DB Class V 60 with four-wheeled coaches sufficed for many years. In 1973 the Deutsche Bundesbahn withdrew its passenger services. With the upgrade of the A9 motorway to six lanes in the mid-1990s the underpass under the motorway would have had to be rebuilt. Because no-one was prepared to fund this, in 1993 the remaining goods services were also withdrawn and the line dismantled. In the meanwhile the station at Falls, which had also been largely downgraded, was closed to passenger trains. In previous years trains had only stopped at Falls on request.

== Route description ==
The line was 5.3 kilometres long and climbed a total of 80 metres during its course. Running along the northern edge of the Fichtel Mountains the Lokalbahn branched off from the Ludwig South-North Railway at Falls, 548 m above sea level, towards the northeast. This linked the Lokalbahn with the towns of Hof and (via the famous Schiefe Ebene) Neuenmarkt; the nearest stations being Marktschorgast in the direction of Neuenmarkt and Stammbach in the direction of Hof.

After a 2 kilometre long descent the line crossed the A 9 at kilometre marker 2.3. The underpass under the motorway was located at the northern end of the present-day motorway rest area of Streitau. Immediately after the motorway at kilometre 2.5 it arrived at the 506 metre high station of Streitau. Next came a 1.5 kilometre long descent into the Ölschnitz Valley to a point 482 metre high, where the Ölschnitz, a tributary of the White Main was crossed on a short stone viaduct at kilometre stone 4.2. After an incline of just under 1000 m long the branch line finally reached its terminus at Gefrees at a height of 500 metres above sea level, at kilometre marker 5.3. Here there were several goods loading tracks, a locomotive shed and private sidings.

An extension of the Lokalbahn to Weißenstadt and a link to the Kirchenlamitz–Weißenstadt railway was planned, but never implemented.

== See also ==
- Royal Bavarian State Railways
- Bavarian branch lines
- List of closed railway lines in Bavaria

== Sources ==
- Dennis Philipp, Martin Müller: Lokalbahn Falls – Gefrees: The kleine Nebenbahn mit der großen Vielfalt. Herausgegeben vom MEC 01 Münchberger Eisenbahnfreunde e. V., 2004.
