= BCL Bay 09 =

BCL Bay09; CL Bay 09/21 BCL Bay 13a; CL Bay 13a/21 BCL Bay 14; CL Bay 14/21
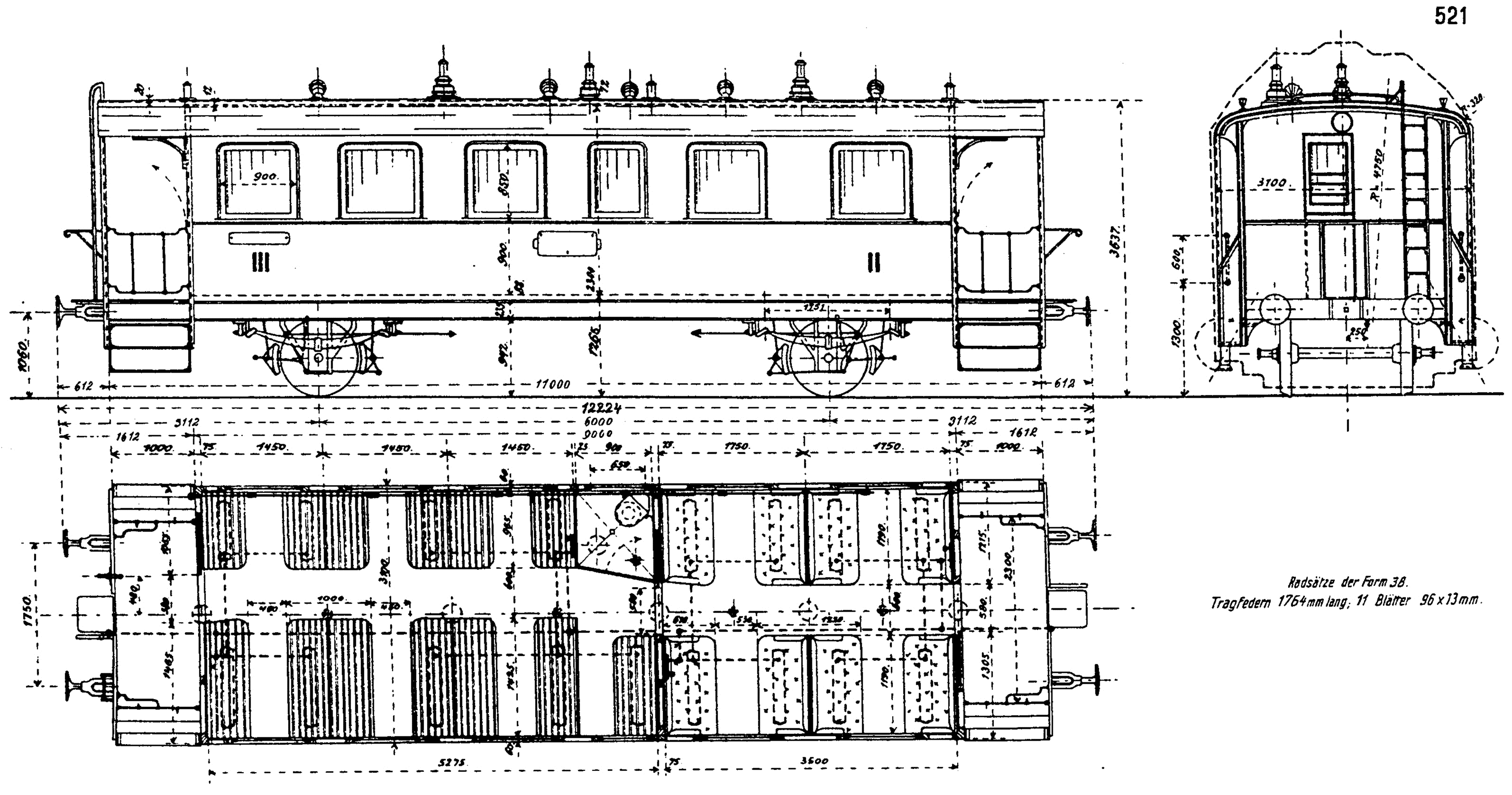
- BCL Bay 09 drawing (1913 KBSB fleet register)
- Stock type: Lokalbahn coach with open gangway
- In service: 1909–1960s
- Manufacturer: MAN /
- Constructed: 1909 / 1913 / 1914
- Number built: 30
- Design code: BCL / CL
- Fleet numbers: 20 072 to 20 089; 20 094 to 20 105

Specifications
- Car length: 9,000 mm (29 ft 6 3/8 in) over main body; 12,224 or 12,024 mm (40 ft 1 1/4 in or 39 ft 5 1/2 in) over buffers
- Width: 3,000 mm (9 ft 10 1/8 in)
- Height: 3,637 mm (11 ft 11 1/4 in)
- Floor height: 1,265 mm (4 ft 1 3/4 in)
- Wheelbase: 6,000 or 6,600 mm (19 ft 8 1/4 in or 21 ft 7 7/8 in)
- Weight: 13,500 or 12,700 kg (29,800 or 28,000 lb) empty
- UIC classification: 2
- Braking system: Screw brake / Westinghouse air
- Coupling system: VDEV screw couplings
- Headlight type: Gas or kerosene lamps
- Seating: 48 seats, 2nd and 3rd class, standing room for 20
- Track gauge: 1,435 mm (4 ft 8 1/2 in)

The Class BCL Bay 09 were open coaches for branch line services with the Royal Bavarian State Railways (K.Bay.Sts.B.) that were built in the early 20th century. They included those coaches listed in the 1913 fleet register under design sheet nos. 521, 6055.2 and 6055.3. As a result of remodelling they were reclassified according to the DRG’s 1930 engineering drawing register as classes CL Bay 09/21, BCL Bay 13a, CL Bay 13a/21, BCL Bay 14 and CL Bay 14/21.

== Development ==
With the growth of the Bavarian branch line network known as Lokalbahnen, there was a need for suitable coaches for local passenger services. Between 1909 and 1929, coaches were procured that had the characteristics of normal passenger coaches on mainline railways. In contrast to other local railway coaches, these were suitable for military transport.

== Procurement ==
From 1909–1929, 411 wagons in classes BL, BCL, CL, DL and PPostL were procured. They all had a standard floor plan, open end-platforms with Dixi gates on the steps and gangways secured only by an iron railing. Large window panes were installed instead of the composite windows that had been usual up to that point. Of the coaches built to Design Sheet 521, 18 were procured in two batches, in 1909 and 1911, from SE in Nuremberg and Rathgeber in Munich.

== Career ==
The whereabouts of four coaches could not be clarified in 1945 after the end of the Second World War. The rest of the coaches went into the Deutsche Bundesbahn, where they were used until the 1960s.

== Design features ==
=== Underframe ===
The underframe of the coach was made entirely of rivetted steel profiles. The outer side beams were U-shaped with outward facing flanges. The crossbeams were also made of U-profiles and not cranked. The wagons had screw couplings of the VDEV type. The drawbar ran the length of the coach and was spring-loaded in the middle. The coaches had slotted cylinder buffers with an installation length of 650 millimetres, the buffer plates had a diameter of 370 millimetres. The platform was shortened for the wagons built to Sheets 6055.2 and 6055.3, resulting in a shorter length over buffers.

=== Running gear ===
The coaches had riveted half-timbered axle holders of VDEV design. The axles were housed in sliding axle bearings. The spoked wheels were of the Bavarian Type 38 design. The suspension springs were 1,764 mm long with a cross-section of 96 x 13 mm. They were eleven leaves thick. Because of the long wheelbase of 6,000 millimetres, VDEV radial axles were used.

In addition to a hand-operated screw brake located on one of the platforms at the end of the coach, the coaches also had air brakes of the Westinghouse type.

=== Body ===
The coach body had a wooden framework covered with sheet metal on the outside and wood panels on the inside. The joints of the sheets were sealed by cover strips. The roof was gently rounded and flush with the side walls. It extended in a hood over the open end-platforms. The coaches in the first delivery series had steps of Lokalbahn branch line design with a folding last step. The remaining delivery series were equipped with main line coach steps.

=== Facilities ===
This class of coach was originally intended for both 2nd and 3rd class passengers and had a total of 48 seats and a toilet. The 2nd class seats were upholstered, the 3rd class seats were wooden slat benches, typical of the class. 20 standing places were designated for the two end-platforms. The end-platforms of coaches built to Sheet 6055.3 and 6055.3 were shortened from 1,000 mm to 900 mm. This also reduced the length over buffers from 1,224 mm to 1,202 mm.

Lighting was provided by paraffin lamps and heating by steam. The coaches were ventilated by static roof vents and sash windows.

== Conversions ==
The cars of the first two delivery series from 1909 and 1911 were converted to CL Bay 09/21 in 1921 except for two units. The upholstered seats in 2nd class were replaced by wooden slatted benches. The Lokalbahn steps were replaced by those used on main lines.

== Drawings ==
Here are sketches of the different variants of the vehicle type for comparison.

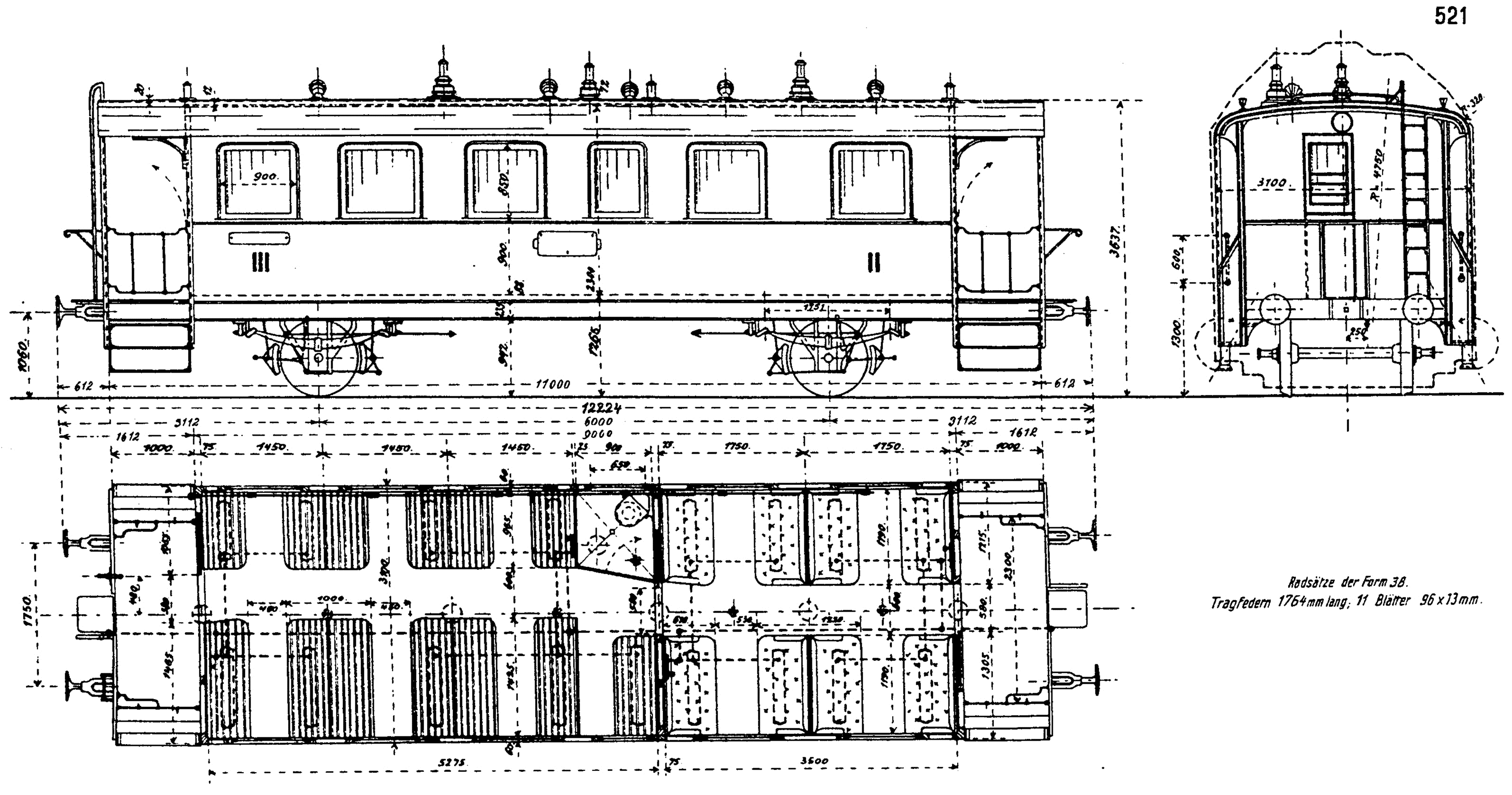
BCL Bay 09 drawing (1913 KBSB fleet register)

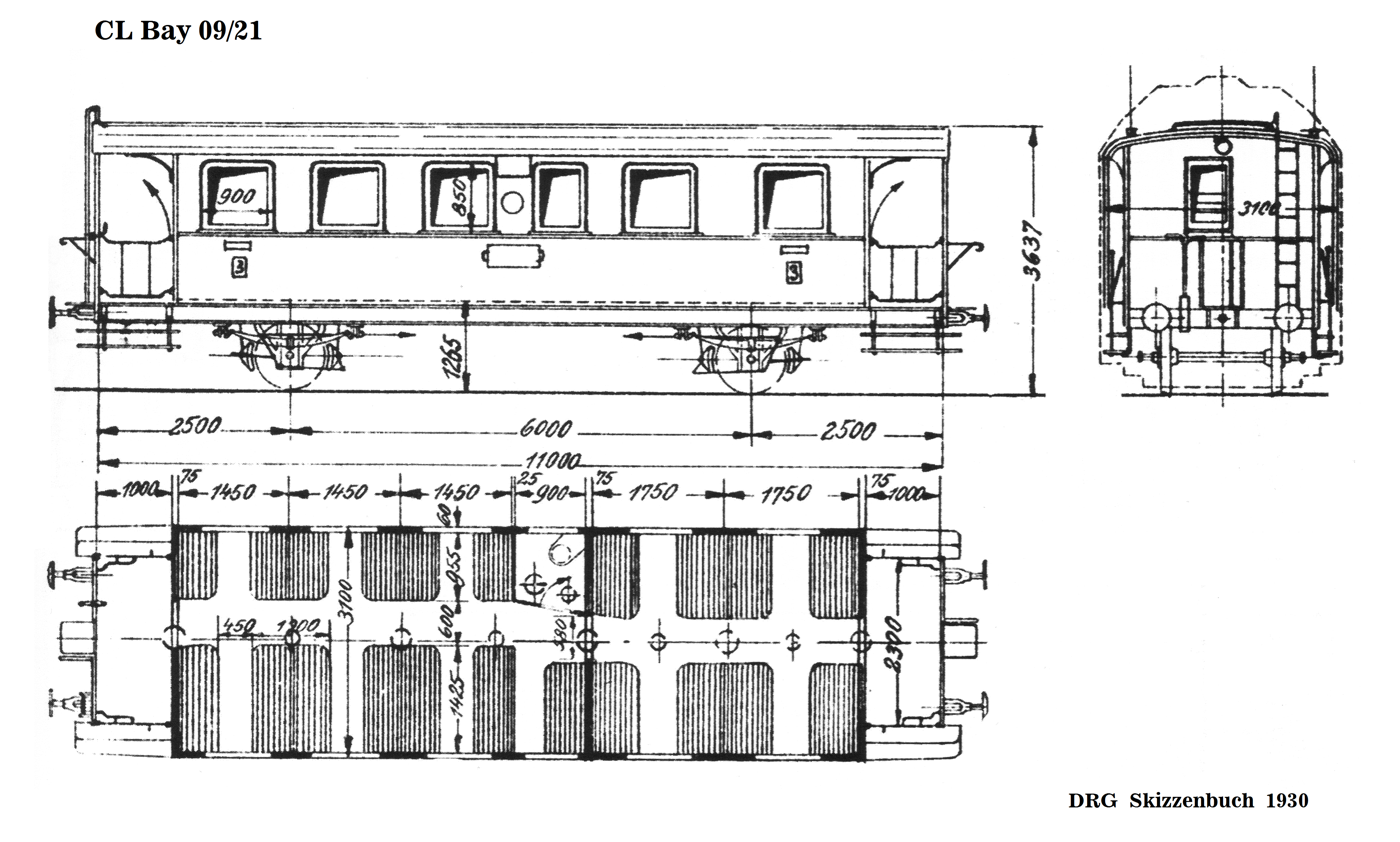
CL Bay 09/21 drawing (1930 DRG register)

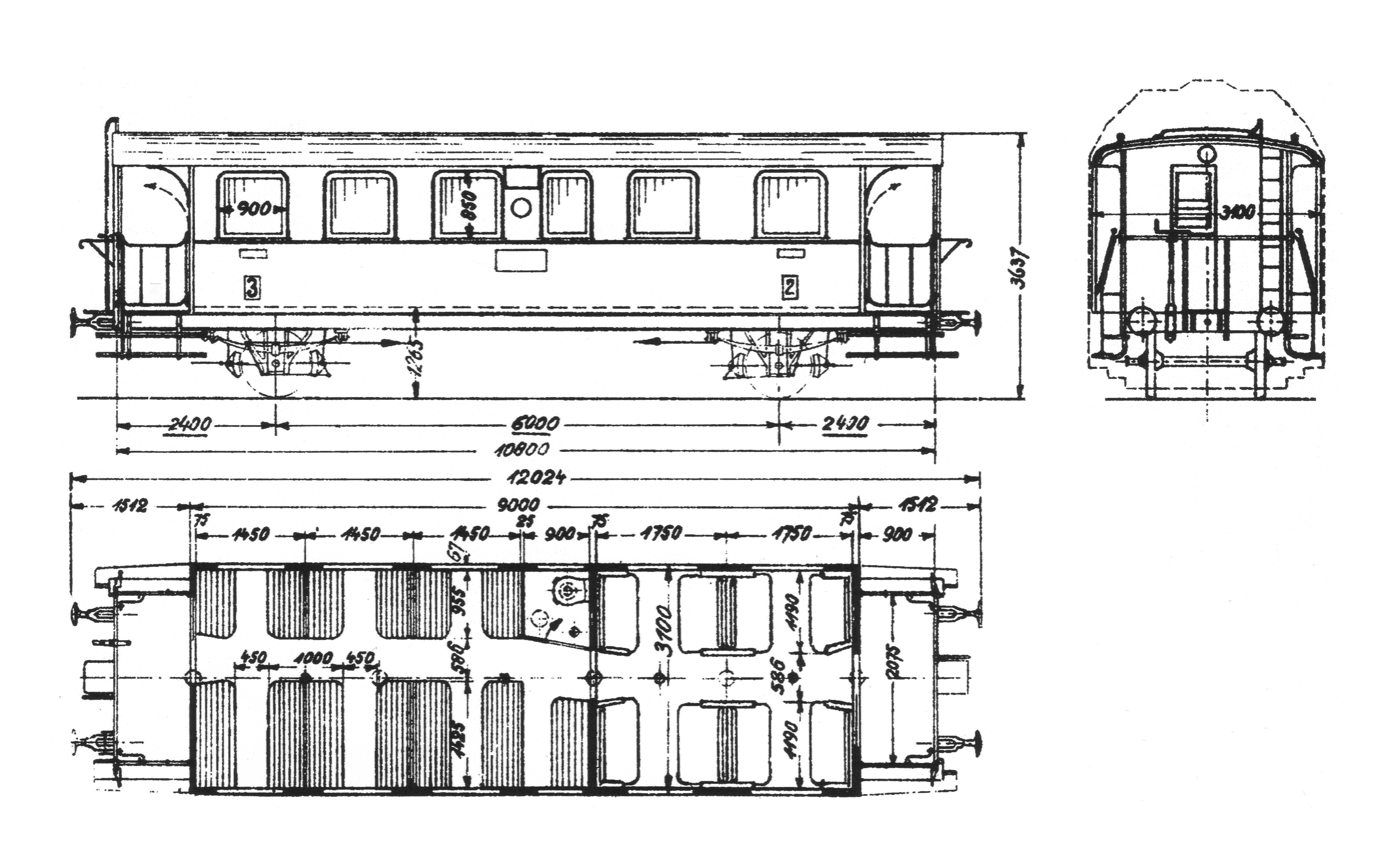
BCL Bay 13a (1930 DRG register)

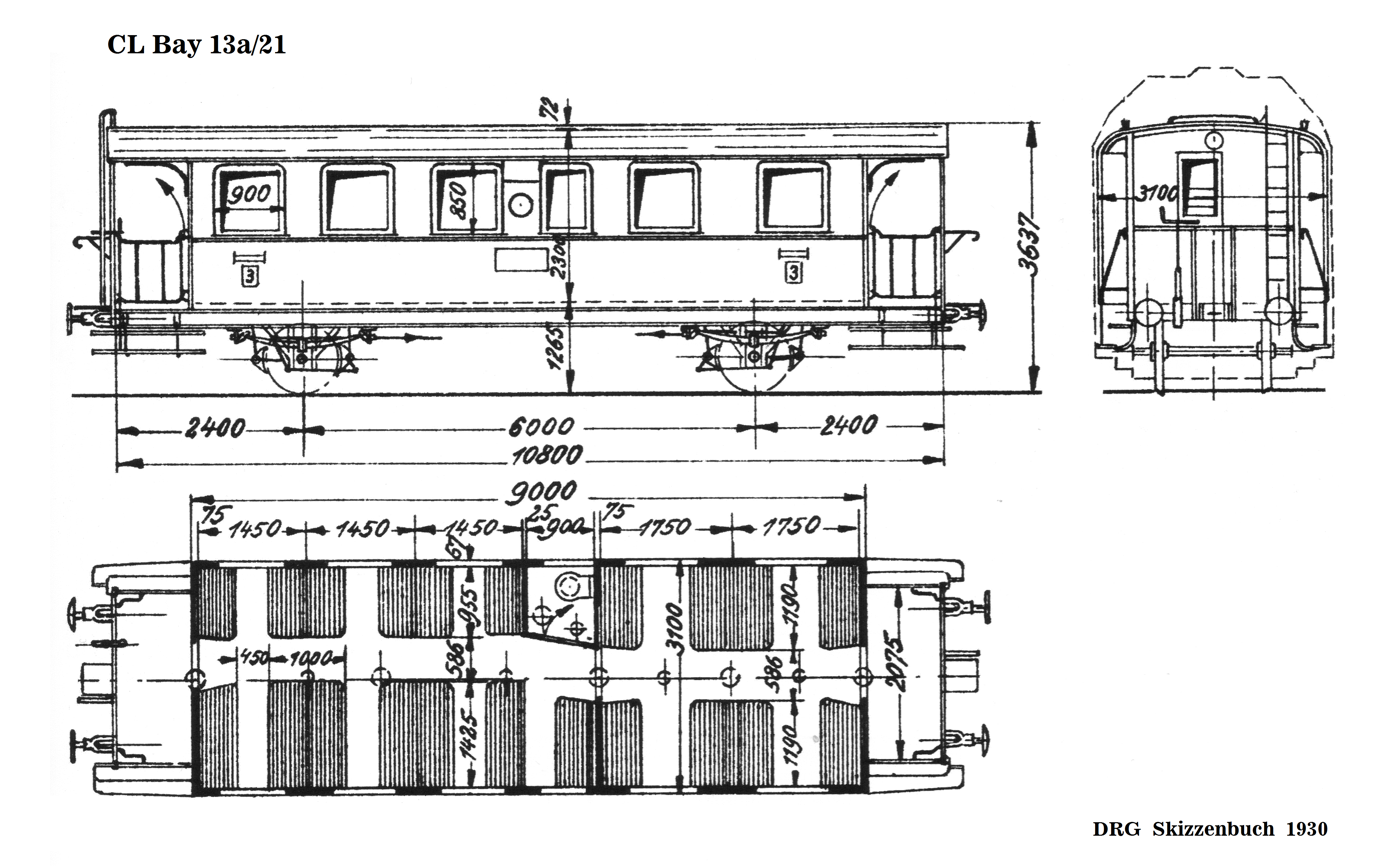
CL Bay 13a/21 (1930 DRG register)

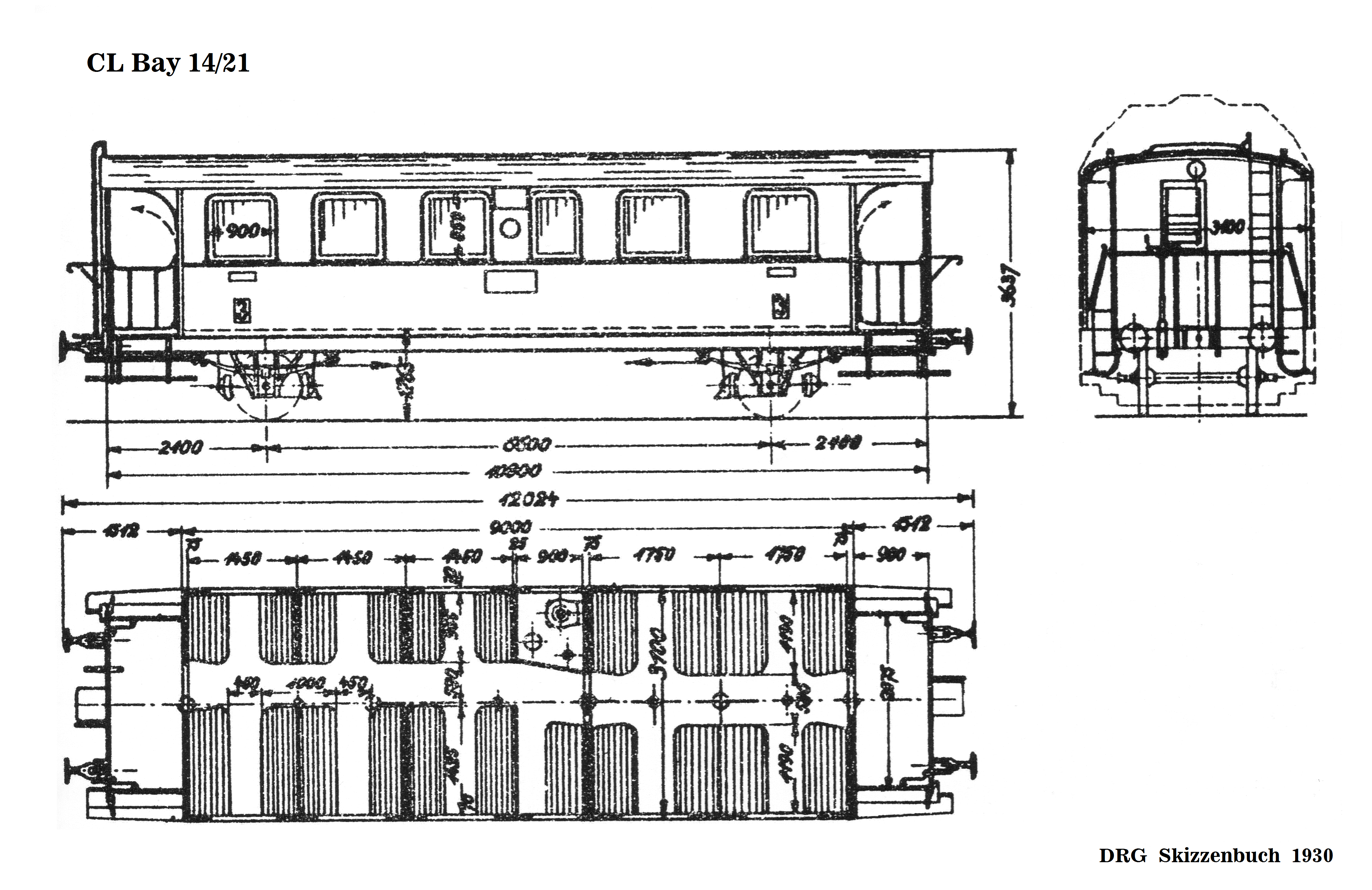
CL Bay 14/21 (1930 DRG register)

== Coach numbering ==
Manufacturing data			Coach numbers by epoch; coach class							Running gear			Facilities							Additional information
Year built	Manu- facturer	from 1909 (1907)	Rep. (1919)	DR (from 1923)	DRG (from 1930)	DRG post-rebuild	Retired	Last home stn.	Brakes	No. of axles	Radial axle	Ltg.	Htg.	No. of toilets	No. of seats by class				Sign holders	Remarks
Sheet No. 521		BCL		BCL Bay 09		CL Bay 09/21			(see Legend)			(see Legend)			1st	2nd	3rd	4th	(see Legend)	
1909	Rathgeber	20 072		9 212 Mü		9 791 Mü	03/1955	Freilassing	Pl, Wsbr	2	V	P	D	1		16; 0	32; 48			
1909	Rathgeber	20 073		9 213 Mü		9 792 Mü	??/1945	Munich	Pl, Wsbr	2	V	P	D	1		16; 0	32; 48			
1909	Rathgeber	20 074		9 214 Mü		9 793 Mü	??/1945	Simbach	Pl, Wsbr	2	V	P	D	1		16; 0	32; 48			
1909	Rathgeber	20 075		9 215 Mü		9 794 Mü	07/1955	Mühldorf	Pl, Wsbr	2	V	P	D	1		16; 0	32; 48			
1909	Rathgeber	20 076		9 216 Mü		9 795 Mü	02/1958	Altomünster	Pl, Wsbr	2	V	P	D	1		16; 0	32; 48			
1909	Rathgeber	20 077		9 211 Au		9 785 Au	06/1959	Freilassing	Pl, Wsbr	2	V	P	D	1		16; 0	32; 48			
1909	Rathgeber	20 078		9 212 Au		9 786 Au	12/1962	Freilassing	Pl, Wsbr	2	V	P	D	1		16; 0	32; 48			
1909	Rathgeber	20 079		9 186 Lu		9 824 Lu	11/1960	Karlsruhe	Pl, Wsbr	2	V	P	D	1		16; 0	32; 48			to the former Palatinate Railway
1909	Rathgeber	20 080		9 187 Lu		9 825 Lu	09/1960	Kaiserslautern	Pl, Wsbr	2	V	P	D	1		16; 0	32; 48			to the former Palatinate Railway
1909	Rathgeber	20 081		9 213 Au		9 787 Au	10/1961	Freilassing	Pl, Wsbr	2	V	P	D	1		16; 0	32; 48			
1909	Rathgeber	20 082		9 203 Wür		9 803 Nür	08/1956	Nuremberg	Pl, Wsbr	2	V	P	D	1		16; 0	32; 48			
1909	Rathgeber	20 083		9 204 Wür		9 804 Nür	05/1955	Mellrichstadt	Pl, Wsbr	2	V	P	D	1		16; 0	32; 48			
1909	Rathgeber	20 084		9 254 Reg		9 814 Reg	08/1959	Plattling	Pl, Wsbr	2	V	P	D	1		16; 0	32; 48			
1909	Rathgeber	20 085		9 255 Reg		9 815 Reg	09/1955	Schwandorf	Pl, Wsbr	2	V	P	D	1		16; 0	32; 48			
1909	Rathgeber	20 086		9 254 Reg		9 814 Reg	08/1959	Plattling	Pl, Wsbr	2	V	P	D	1		16; 0	32; 48			
Sheet No. 521		BCL		BCL Bay 09	BCL Bay 09	CL Bay 09/21			(see Legend)			(see Legend)			1st	2nd	3rd	4th	(see Legend)	
1911	MAN	20 087		9 325 Mü		9 859 Mü	08/1961	Munich	Pl, Wsbr	2	V	P	D	1		16; 0	32; 48			
1911	MAN	20 088		9 122 Nür	9 851 Nür		04/1951	Rothenb.o.T.	Pl, Wsbr	2	V	P	D	1		16; 0	32; 48			
1911	MAN	20 089		9 123 Nür	9 852 Nür		xx/1935	Lohr	Pl, Wsbr	2	V	P	D	1		16; 0	32; 48			
Sheet No. 6055.2		BCL		BCL Bay 13a	BCL Bay 13a	CL Bay 13a/21			(see Legend)			(see Legend)			1st	2nd	3rd	4th	(see Legend)	
1913	Rathgeber	20 094 Nü		9 281 Nür		9 940 Reg	06/1957	Augsburg	Pl, Wsbr	2	V	P	D	1		16; 0	32; 48			
1913	Rathgeber	20 095 Nü		9 282 Nür		9 940 Reg	02/1950	Regensburg.	Pl, Wsbr	2	V	P	D	1		16; 0	32; 48			Unserviceable (Altschadwagen)
1913	Rathgeber	20 096 Nü		9 283 Nür		9 842 Reg	04/1960	Hof	Pl, Wsbr	2	V	P	D	1		16; 0	32; 48			
1913	Rathgeber	20 097 Wü		9 111 Nür	9 928 Nür		10/1946	Nuremberg	Pl, Wsbr	2	V	P	D	1		16; 0	32; 48			
1913	Rathgeber	20 098 Wü		9 112 Nür	9 929 Nür		02/1956	Nuremberg	Pl, Wsbr	2	V	P	D	1		16; 0	32; 48			
Sheet No. 6055.3		BCL		BCL Bay 14	BCL Bay 14	CL Bay 14/21			(see Legend)			(see Legend)			1st	2nd	3rd	4th	(see Legend)	
1914	MAN	20 099 Re		9 256 Reg		9 975 Reg	??/1945	Selb Stadt	Pl, Wsbr	2	V	P	D	1		16; 0	32; 48			
1914	MAN	20 100 Re		9 117 Reg		9 976 Reg	11/1959	Hof.	Pl, Wsbr	2	V	P	D	1		16; 0	32; 48			
1914	MAN	20 101 Nü		9 284 Nür		9 621 Nür	01/1960	Erlangen	Pl, Wsbr	2	V	P	D	1		16; 0	32; 48			
1914	MAN	20 102 Nü		9 285 Nür		9 962 Nür	??/1945	Ludwigstadt	Pl, Wsbr	2	V	P	D	1		16; 0	32; 48			
1914	MAN	20 103 Au		9 214 Au		9 945 Au	05/1961	Munich?	Pl, Wsbr	2	V	P	D	1		16; 0	32; 48			
1914	MAN	20 104 Au		9 215 Au		9 946 Au	??/1945	Schongau	Pl, Wsbr	2	V	P	D	1		16; 0	32; 48			
1914	MAN	20 105 Wü		9 205 Wür		9 963 Wür	03/1947	Nuremberg	Pl, Wsbr	2	V	P	D	1		16; 0	32; 48			Unserviceable (Altschadwagen)
Legend: brakes (Br.)				Manual brake types		BrH = brakeman's cabin , Pl = manual brake on the platform, Fsbr = open seat brake (Note: A Freisitzbremse was a screw brake operated from an open seat on the roof.)														
				Air brakes		Hnbr = Henri brake, Hsbr = Henri rapid-acting brake, Kp. = Knorr brake, Sbr. = Schleifer brake, Ssbr = Schleifer rapid-acting brake, Wbr = Westinghouse brake, Wsbr = Westinghouse rapid-acting brake														
				Vacuum brakes		Hbr = Hardy brake, Ahbr = Automatic Hardy vacuum brake														
Legend: lighting (Ltg.)				Types of lighting		P = paraffin lamps, G = gas lamps, Gg = gas mantle lamps, El = electric lights														
Legend: heating				Types of heating		O = stove heating, D = steam heating, Pr. = briquette heating, L = only steam heating														
Legend: sign holders				for crossing into		AT = Austria, IT = Italy, CH = Switzerland, FR = France, BE = Belgium														

== See also ==
The following coaches were also built for the Lokalbahn branch line network:

- CL Bay 06b, short passenger coach
- CL Bay 11a, long passenger coach
- GwL, goods van
- PwPost Bay 06, mail/luggage van

== Literature ==
- Wagner, Alto (2015), Bayerische Reisezugwagen (in German) (1 ed.), KIRUBA Verlag, ISBN 978-3-945631-00-3
- Konrad, Emil (1984), Die Reisezugwagen der deutschen Länderbahnen. Band 2 (in German) (1 ed.), Stuttgart: Franckh, ISBN 3-440-05327-X
- Wagenpark-Verzeichnis der Kgl. Bayer. Staatseisenbahnen. Pfälzisches Netz. Aufgestellt nach dem Stande vom 31. März 1913 (in German), 1913
