= CL Bay 06b =

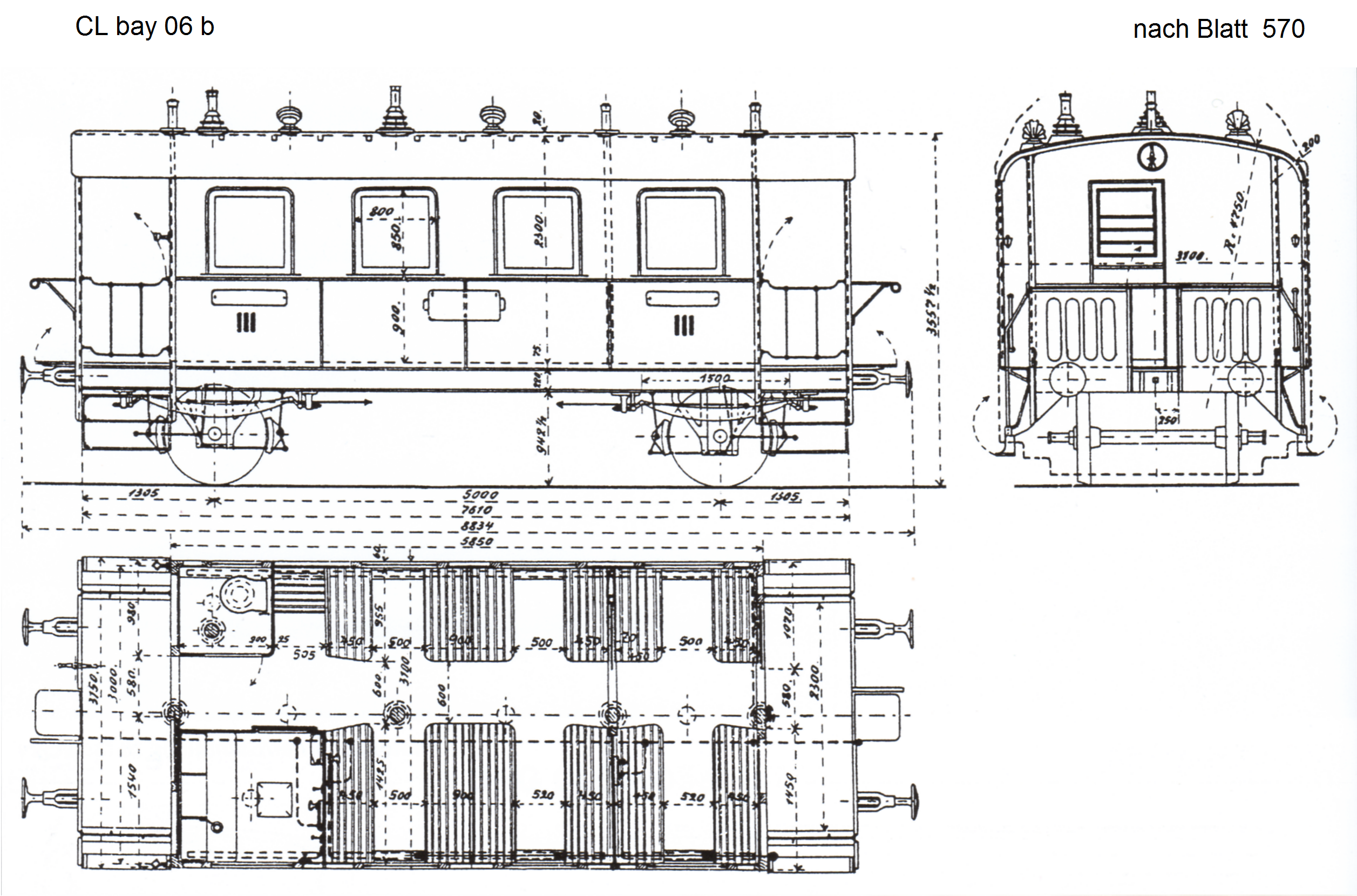
- Lightweight open coach (Sheet 570)
- Stock type: Open coach with open end-platforms
- Manufacturer: Waggonfabrik Josef Rathgeber
- Constructed: 1906–1909
- Retired: to 1961
- Number built: 74
- Design code: CL
- Fleet numbers: 20 048 to 20 071

Specifications
- Car length: 5,850 mm (19 ft 2 3/8 in) over body; 7,610 mm (24 ft 11 5/8 in) over headstocks; 8,834 mm (28 ft 11 3/4 in) over buffers
- Width: 3,100 mm (10 ft 2 in)
- Height: 3,557 mm (11 ft 8 in)
- Wheelbase: 5,000 mm (16 ft 4 7/8 in)
- Weight: 8.1–8.4 t (8.0–8.3 long tons; 8.9–9.3 short tons) tare
- Braking system(s): Screw brake / Westinghouse
- Coupling system: VDEV screw couplings
- Seating: 31 Third class
- Track gauge: 1,435 mm (4 ft 8 1/2 in)

The Bavarian CL Bay 06b was a short open coach for branch line services with the Royal Bavarian State Railways (k.Bay.Sts.B.). It was listed in their 1913 fleet register under Design Sheet No. 570.

== Development ==
With the growth of the branch line network in the Kingdom of Bavaria, there was a need for suitable coaches on the so-called Lokalbahnen or local railway lines. Since the only available locomotives were tank engines with low tractive power, such as the Class PtL 2/2, passenger coaches of a particularly light design were required. These coaches were not suitable for military transport.

== Procurement ==
Between 1905 and 1911 a total of 281 wagons of classes BL, BCL, CL and PPostL were procured, all of which - except for the wagons of Class PPostL - had a uniform floor plan, open platforms at each end with Dixi gates on the steps and gangways only protected by a single iron railing. Large window panes were fitted instead of the composite windows that had been usual up to that point. They are sometimes referred to as 'the shorts' or 'the short ones' (Die Kurze).

Between 1906 and 1909, 74 of these wagons, built to the specifications of Design Sheet 570, were procured in a total of five batches from the company of Waggonfabrik Josef Rathgeber in Munich. In contrast to the CL based on Sheet 569, these had a service compartment for the guard.

== Career ==
Four coaches were retired by 1939. After the end of the Second World War in 1945, the location of other new coaches could no longer be ascertained. Of the vehicles delivered, 51 entered DB service, where they were decommissioned by 1960.

== Design features ==
=== Underframe ===
The underframe of the coach was made entirely of rivetted structural steel. The outer longitudinal beams were U-shaped with outward facing flanges. The crossbeams were also made of U-profiles and not cranked. The wagons had screw couplings of VDEV design. The drawbar ran the length of the vehicle and was spring-loaded in the middle. As buffing equipment, the wagons had slotted cylindrical buffers with an installation length of 612 millimetres, the buffer plates had a diameter of 370 millimetres.

=== Running gear ===
The coaches had riveted half-timbered axle boxes of the short type, made of sheet steel. The axles were housed in sliding axle bearings. The wheels were spoked. Due to the long wheelbase of 5,000 millimetres, standard VDEV radial axles were used. In addition to a screw brake, which was located on one of the platforms at the end of the coach, the coaches also had air brakes of the Westinghouse system.

=== Body ===
The frame of the coach body consisted of wooden posts. This was covered with sheet metal on the outside and wood on the inside. The joints of the sheets were covered by cover strips. The roof was gently rounded and extended beyond the open end-platforms. The coaches had folding branch line steps, which were later replaced by normal ones.

=== Facilities ===
The coach was 3rd class only and had a total of 31 seats and a toilet. A total of 20 standing places were designated for the two end-platforms. The coaches were lit by paraffin lamps and had steam heating. They were ventilated by static ceiling ventilators.

== Coach numbering ==
Manufacturing data			Coach numbers by epoch; coach class							Running gear			Facilities							Additional information	
Year built	Manu- facturer	Qty.	from 1875	from 1909 (1907)	Rep. (1919)	DR (from 1923)	DRG (from 1930)	DRG post-rebuild	Retired	Brakes	No. of axles	Radial axle	Ltg.	Htg.	No. of toilets	No. of seats by class				Sign holders	Remarks
Design Sheet No. 570				CL		CL Bay 06b	CL Bay 06b			(see legend)			(see legend)			1st	2nd	3rd	4th	(see legend)	
1906	Rathg.	8		20 655		9 301 Reg	9 573 Reg		03/1954	Pl, Wsbr	2	V	P	D	1			31			
1906	Rathg.	8		20 656		9 302 Reg	9 574 Reg		07/1957	Pl, Wsbr	2	V	P	D	1			31			
1906	Rathg.	8		20 657		9 303 Reg	9 575 Reg		06/1950	Pl, Wsbr	2	V	P	D	1			31			Unserviceable (Altschadwagen)
1906	Rathg.	8		20 658		9 304 Reg	9 576 Reg		10/1954	Pl, Wsbr	2	V	P	D	1			31			
1906	Rathg.	8		20 659		9 305 Reg	9 577 Reg		08/1951	Pl, Wsbr	2	V	P	D	1			31			Unserviceable (Altschadwagen)
1906	Rathg.	8		20 660		9 306 Reg	9 578 Reg		10/1958	Pl, Wsbr	2	V	P	D	1			31			
1906	Rathg.	8		20 661		9 307 Reg	9 579 Reg		xx/193x	Pl, Wsbr	2	V	P	D	1			31			
1906	Rathg.	8		20 662		9 308 Reg	9 580 Reg		09/1954	Pl, Wsbr	2	V	P	D	1			31			
1907	Rathg.	18		20 663		9 327 Nür	9 653 Nür		03/1947	Pl, Wsbr	2	V	P	D	1			31			Unserviceable (Altschadwagen)
1907	Rathg.	18		20 664		9 328 Nür	9 654 Nür		02/1957	Pl, Wsbr	2	V	P	D	1			31			
1907	Rathg.	18		20 665		9 329 Nür	9 655 Nür		12/1957	Pl, Wsbr	2	V	P	D	1			31			
1907	Rathg.	18		20 666		9 330 Nür	9 656 Nür		10/1951	Pl, Wsbr	2	V	P	D	1			31			Unserviceable (Altschadwagen)
1907	Rathg.	18		20 667		9 331 Nür	9 657 Nür		10/1954	Pl, Wsbr	2	V	P	D	1			31			
1907	Rathg.	18		20 668		9 332 Nür	9 658 Nür		09/1958	Pl, Wsbr	2	V	P	D	1			31			
1907	Rathg.	18		20 669		9 248 Mü	9 631 Mü		01/1960	Pl, Wsbr	2	V	P	D	1			31			
1907	Rathg.	18		20 670		9 249 Mü	9 632 Mü		03/1960	Pl, Wsbr	2	V	P	D	1			31			
1907	Rathg.	18		20 671		9 327 Nür	9 653 Nür		09/1951	Pl, Wsbr	2	V	P	D	1			31			Unserviceable (Altschadwagen)
1907	Rathg.	18		20 672		9 251 Mü	9 634 Mü		05/1959	Pl, Wsbr	2	V	P	D	1			31			
1907	Rathg.	18		20 673		9 252 Mü	9 635 Mü		03/1956	Pl, Wsbr	2	V	P	D	1			31			
1907	Rathg.	18		20 674		9 234 Au	9 629 Au		07/1955	Pl, Wsbr	2	V	P	D	1			31			
1907	Rathg.	18		20 675		9 235 Au	9 630 Au		02/1959	Pl, Wsbr	2	V	P	D	1			31			
1907	Rathg.	18		20 676		9 333 Nür	9 659 Nür		07/1960	Pl, Wsbr	2	V	P	D	1			31			
1907	Rathg.	18		20 677		9 334 Nür	9 660 Nür		? 1945	Pl, Wsbr	2	V	P	D	1			31			
1907	Rathg.	18		20 678		9 335 Nür	9 661 Nür		06/1950	Pl, Wsbr	2	V	P	D	1			31			Unserviceable (Altschadwagen)
1907	Rathg.	18		20 679		9 336 Nür	9 662 Nür		07/1950	Pl, Wsbr	2	V	P	D	1			31			Unserviceable (Altschadwagen)
1907	Rathg.	18		20 680		9 337 Nür	9 663 Nür		11/1957	Pl, Wsbr	2	V	P	D	1			31			
1909	Rathg.	12		20 739		9 352 Nür	9 800 Nür		09/1962	Pl, Wsbr	2	V	P	D	1			31			
1909	Rathg.	12		20 740		9 353 Nür	9 812 Reg		03/1954	Pl, Wsbr	2	V	P	D	1			31			
1909	Rathg.	12		20 741		9 354 Nür	9 813 Reg		11/1950	Pl, Wsbr	2	V	P	D	1			31			
1909	Rathg.	12		20 742		9 236 Wür	9 801 Nür		10/1955	Pl, Wsbr	2	V	P	D	1			31			
1909	Rathg.	12		20 743		9 237 Wür	9 802 Nür		05/1942	Pl, Wsbr	2	V	P	D	1			31			
1909	Rathg.	12		20 744		9 277 Mü	9 789 Mü		06/1951	Pl, Wsbr	2	V	P	D	1			31			Unserviceable (Altschadwagen)
1909	Rathg.	12		20 745		9 278 Mü	9 790 Mü		02/1953	Pl, Wsbr	2	V	P	D	1			31			
1909	Rathg.	12		20 746		9 238 Au	9 699 Au		04/1956	Pl, Wsbr	2	V	P	D	1			31			
1909	Rathg.	12		20 747		9 239 Au	9 700 Au		08/1962	Pl, Wsbr	2	V	P	D	1			31			
1909	Rathg.	12		20 748		9 279 Mü	9 727 Mü		03/1959	Pl, Wsbr	2	V	P	D	1			31			
1909	Rathg.	12		20 749		9 280 Mü	9 728 Mü		? 1945	Pl, Wsbr	2	V	P	D	1			31			
1909	Rathg.	12		20 750		9 281 Mü	9 729 Mü		? 1945	Pl, Wsbr	2	V	P	D	1			31			
1909	Rathg.	3		20 780		9 366 Nür	9 809 Nür		? 1945	Pl, Wsbr	2	V	P	D	1			31			
1909	Rathg.	3		20 781		9 367 Nür	9 810 Nür		12/1956	Pl, Wsbr	2	V	P	D	1			31			
1909	Rathg.	3		20 782		9 368 Nür	9 811 Nür		01/1957	Pl, Wsbr	2	V	P	D	1			31			
Legend: brakes (Br.)				Manual brake types		BrH = brakeman's cabin, Pl = manual brake on the platform, Fsbr = Freisitzbremse															
				Air brakes		Hnbr = Henri brake, Hsbr = Henri rapid-acting brake, Kp. = Knorr brake, Sbr. = Schleifer brake, Ssbr = Schleifer rapid-acting brake, Wbr = Westinghouse brake, Wsbr = Westinghouse rapid-acting brake															
				Vacuum brakes		Hbr = Hardy brake, Ahbr = Automatic Hardy vacuum brake															
Legend: lighting (Ltg.)				Types of lighting		P = paraffin lamps, G = gas lamps, Gg = gas mantle lamps, El = electric lights															
Legend: heating				Types of heating		O = stove heating, D = steam heating, Pr. = briquette heating, L = only steam heating															
Legend: sign holders				for crossing into		AT = Austria, IT = Italy, CH = Switzerland, FR = France, BE = Belgium															

== See also ==
The following coaches were also built for the Lokalbahn branch line network:

- BCL Bay 09, long passenger coach
- CL Bay 11a, long passenger coach
- GwL, branch line goods van
- PwPost Bay 06, mail/luggage van

== Literature ==
- Wagner, Alto (2015), Bayerische Reisezugwagen (in German) (1 ed.), KIRUBA Verlag, ISBN 978-3-945631-00-3
- Konrad, Emil (1984), Die Reisezugwagen der deutschen Länderbahnen. Band 2 (in German) (1 ed.), Stuttgart: Franckh, ISBN 3-440-05327-X
- Wagenpark-Verzeichnis der Kgl. Bayer. Staatseisenbahnen. Pfälzisches Netz. Based on the fleet as at 31 March 1913 (in German), 1913
