= CL Bay 11a =

CL Bay 11a CL Bay 14^{II}
- Stock type: Lokalbahn coach with open gangways
- Manufacturer: MAN
- Constructed: 1911/1914
- Retired: by 1962
- Number built: 28
- Design code: CL
- Fleet numbers: 20 796 to 20 806; 20 783 to 20 787

Specifications
- Car length: 9,000 mm (29 ft 6 3/8 in) over body; 11,000 or 10,800 mm (36 ft 1 1/8 in or 35 ft 5 1/4 in) over headstocks; 12,224 or 12,024 mm (40 ft 1 1/4 in or 39 ft 5 3/8 in) over buffers
- Width: 3,000 mm (9 ft 10 1/8 in)
- Height: 3,637 mm (11 ft 11 1/4 in)
- Floor height: 1,265 mm (4 ft 1 3/4 in)
- Wheelbase: 6,000 or 6,600 mm (19 ft 8 1/4 in or 21 ft 7 7/8 in)
- Braking system(s): Screw brake / Westinghouse
- Coupling system: VDEV screw couplings
- Seating: 56 third class
- Track gauge: 1,435 mm (4 ft 8 1/2 in)

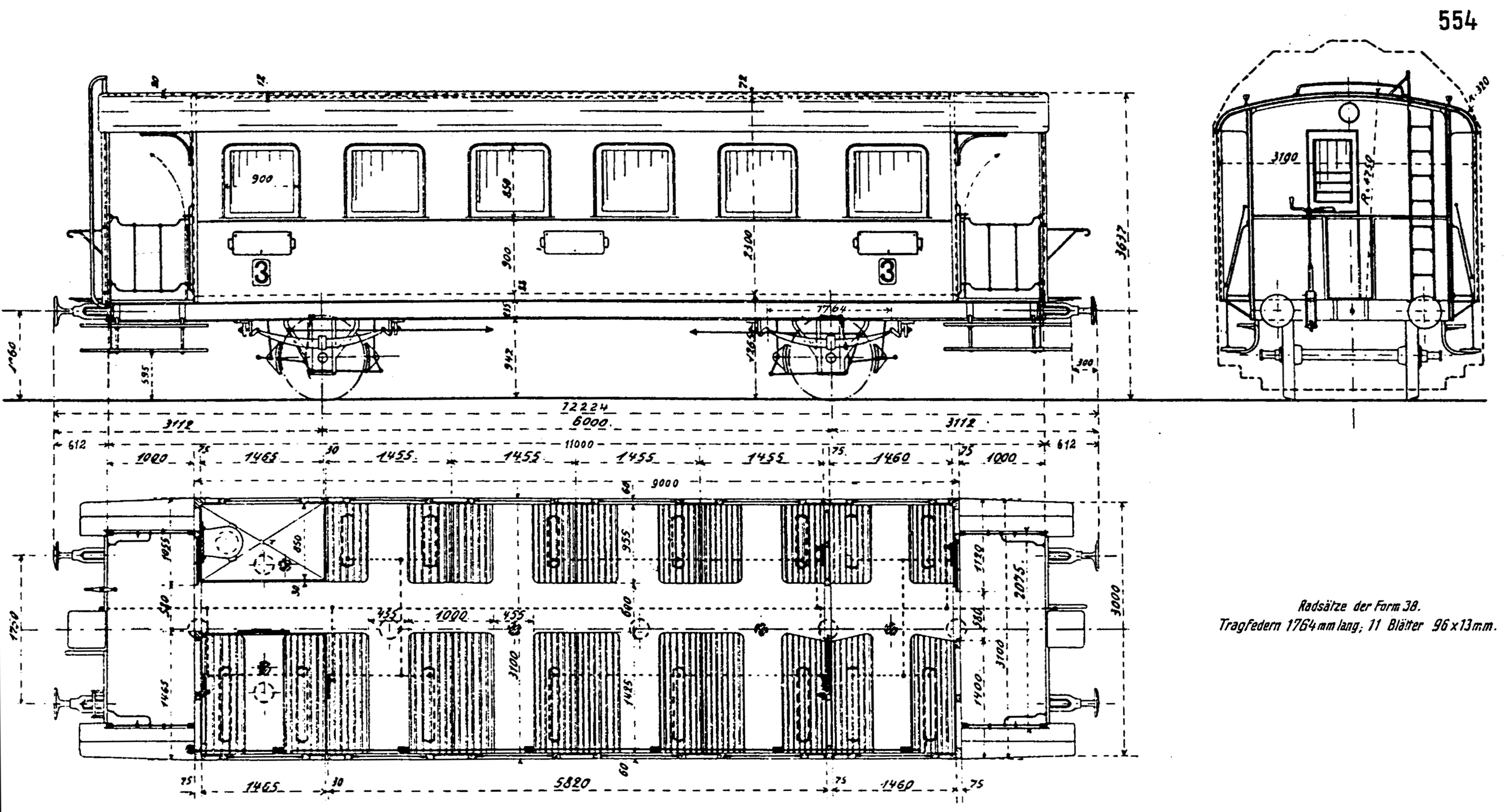
Drawing of the CL Bay 11a

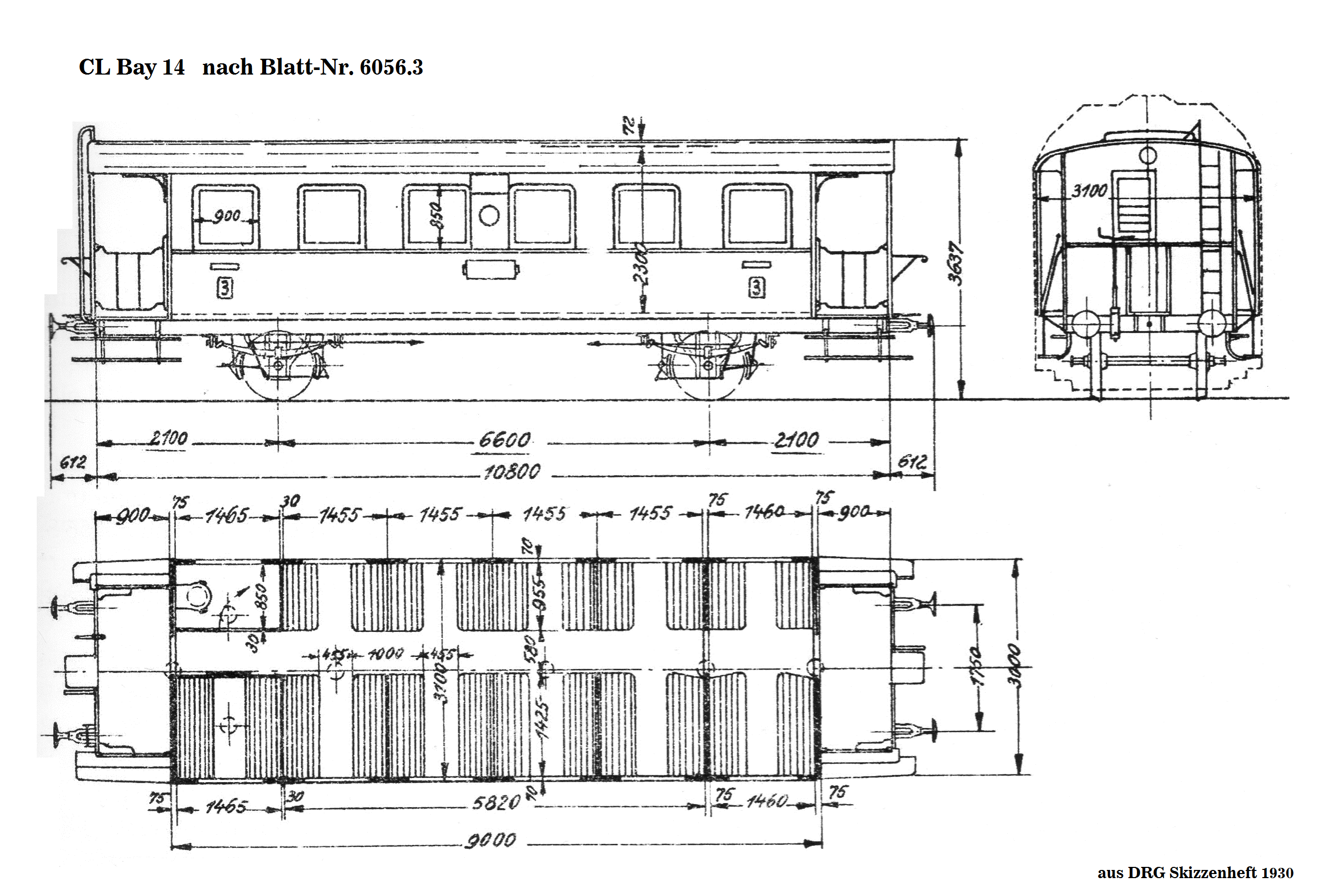
Drawing of the CL Bay 14a

The CL Bay 11a and CL Bay 14a were a class of open coach built for the Bavarian branch lines (Lokalbahn in the early 20th century. They were listed under Design Sheet 554 in the 1913 Fleet Register of the Royal Bavarian State Railways (K.Bay.Sts.B.). In the engineering register of the Deutsche Reichsbahn they were listed as the Class CL Bay 14^{II} under Sheet No. 6056.3.

== Development ==
With the growth of the Lokalbahn branch line network in Bavaria, there was a need for suitable coaches for local passenger services. Between 1909 and 1929, coaches were procured that had the characteristics of normal passenger coaches for mainline railways. In contrast to other branch line coaches, these were suitable for military transport.

== Procurement ==
In total, in the period between 1909 and 1929, 411 class BL, BCL, CL, DL and PPostL coaches were procured. They all had a standard floor plan, open end-platforms with Dixi gates on the steps and gangways protected only by a single iron railing. Large window panes were installed instead of the composite windows that had been usual up to that point. Between 1911 and 1914, 36 coaches built to Design Sheet 554 were procured in a total of five batches from the companies of MAN in Nuremberg and Rathgeber in Munich.

== Career ==
The whereabouts of three coaches could no longer be determined after the end of the Second World War in 1945. The remainder of the coaches went into the Deutsche Bundesbahn, where they were retired by 1962.

== Design features ==
=== Undercarriage ===
The underframe of the coach was made entirely of riveted steel beams. The outer side beams were U-shaped with outward facing flanges. The crossbeams were also made of U-profiles and not cranked. The wagons had screw couplings of VDEV design as coupling equipment. The drawbar ran the length of the vehicle and was spring-loaded in the middle. The coaches had slotted cylinder buffers with an installation length of 650 millimetres, the buffer plates had a diameter of 370 millimetres. The coaches built to Design Sheet 6056.3 had shorter platforms which resulted in a shorter length over buffers.

=== Running gear ===
The coaches had riveted half-timbered axle holders of VDEV design. The axles were stored in sliding axle bearings. The wheels were spoked. Due to the long wheelbase of 6,000/6,600 millimetres, VDEV radial axles were used.

In addition to a screw brake located on one of the platforms at the end of the coach, the coaches also had air brakes of the Westinghouse type.

=== Body ===
The frame of the coach body consisted of wooden posts. This was covered with sheet metal on the outside and wood panelling on the inside. The joints of the sheets were concealed by cover strips. The roof was gently rounded and extended in a hood over the open end-platforms. The wagons had steps like those on mainline coaches and no longer the folding steps common on Lokalbahn stock.

=== Facilities ===
The CL coaches only carried 3rd class passengers and had a total of 56 seats and a toilet. The compartment opposite the toilet was separated from the central aisle by a lockable door and served as a sliding compartment for transporting prisoners. Alternatively, it could be used as a guard's compartment. A total of 20 standing places were designated for the two end-platforms. The end-platforms of coaches built to Sheet 6056.3 were shortened from 1,000 mm to 900 mm.

Lighting was provided by paraffin lamps and the coaches had steam heating. The coaches were ventilated by static roof vents and sash windows.

== See also ==
The following coaches were also built for the Lokalbahn branch line network:

- BCL Bay 09, long passenger coach
- CL Bay 06b, short passenger coach
- GwL, goods van
- PwPost Bay 06, mail/luggage van

== Literature ==
- Alto Wagner (2015), Bayerische Reisezugwagen (in German) (1 ed.), KIRUBA Verlag, ISBN 978-3-945631-00-3
- Emil Konrad (1984), Die Reisezugwagen der deutschen Länderbahnen. Band 2 (in German) (1 ed.), Stuttgart: Franckh, ISBN 3-440-05327-X
- Wagenpark-Verzeichnis der Kgl. Bayer. Staatseisenbahnen. Pfälzisches Netz. Aufgestellt nach dem Stande vom 31. März 1913 (in German), 1913
