= Bavarian branch lines =

Railway lines in Bavaria

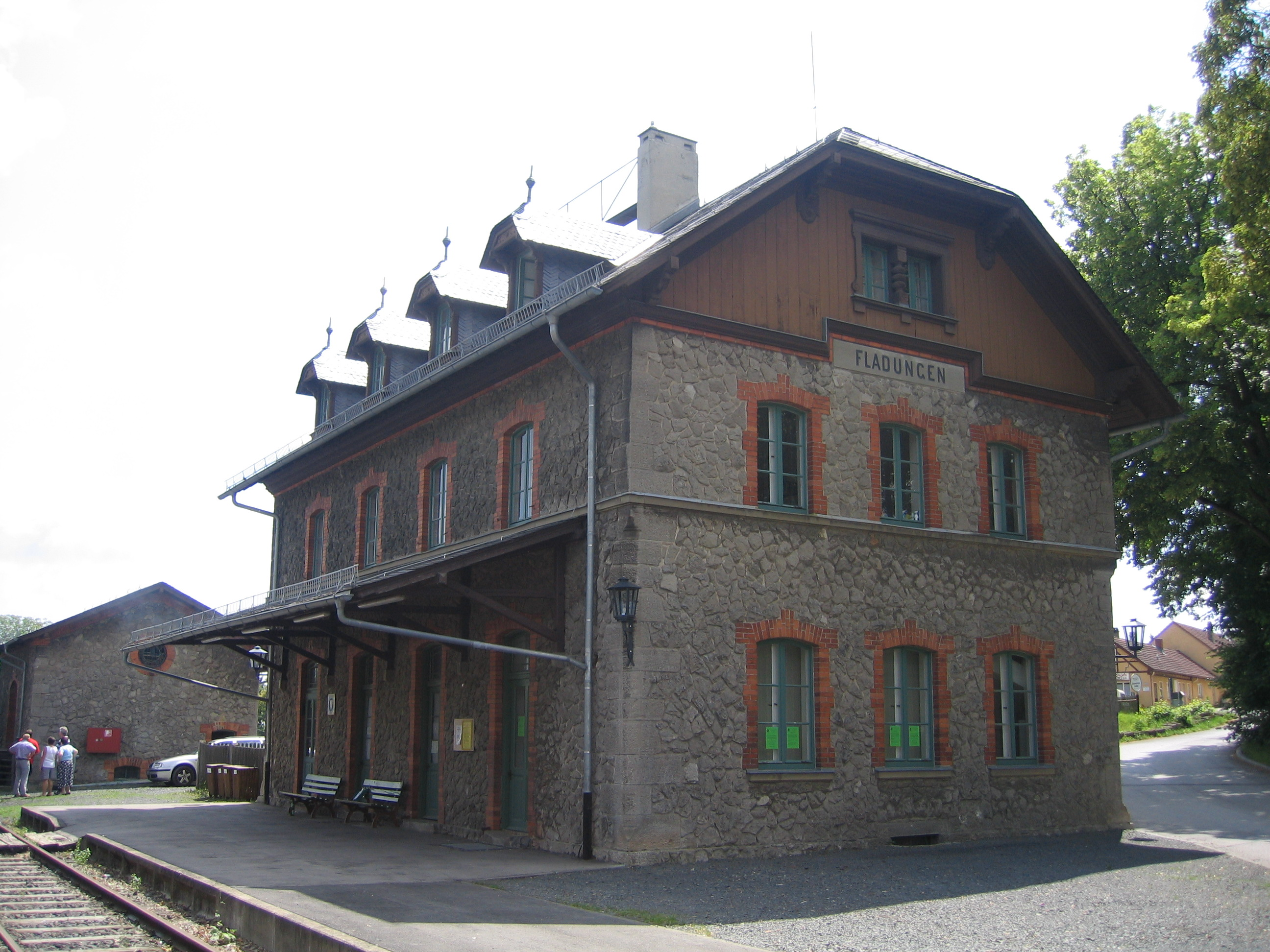
Station building at Fladungen, the terminus on the Bavarian branch line from Mellrichstadt, now a museum railway

Bavarian branch lines comprised nearly half the total railway network in Bavaria, a state in the southeastern Germany that was a kingdom in the days of the German Empire. The construction era for branch lines lasted from 1872, when the first route, from Siegelsdorf to Langenzenn, was opened, to 1930, when the last section of the branch from Gößweinstein to Behringersmühle went operational.

== History ==
The first German railway line was opened in Bavaria in 1835. This was the Ludwigsbahn (Ludwig's Railway) from Nuremberg to Fürth which opened on 7 December 1835. This was the start of a railway building frenzy, which rapidly spread across the state. The second Bavarian railway line, from Munich to Augsburg, soon followed. The early railways were private lines, but from 184?, the Bavarian state oversaw the construction of railways, through its state-owned railway company, the Royal Bavarian State Railways. The most important routes were established first, of course, and became the 'main lines', the backbone of the Bavarian railway network which has lasted to the present day.

=== The first branch lines – Vizinalbahnen ===
The first branch lines to appear in Bavaria – indeed in Germany – were the so-called Vizinalbahnen ('neighbourhood lines'). This was a legal term and envisaged the costs of real estate acquisition and line construction being raised locally, whilst profits would be shared between state and district, in accordance with the statuted dated 29 April 1869.

The first line to be built was the 5.5 kilometre stretch from Siegelsdorf to Langenzenn opened on 25 May 1872. Over the next seven years a further 14 Vizinalbahnen were built, including the Bavarian Ostbahn route from Wiesau – Tirschenreuth.

Compared to the main lines, the regulations for these branch lines were relaxed. Steep inclines (up to 1:25), tight curves (100 m) and a narrower subgrade were permitted; as were lighter rails (or used main line rails), lighter vehicles and lower speeds. All the lines were standard gauge. Narrow gauge lines were much rarer in Bavaria than in other states.

=== The Sekundärbahnen ===
Because the Vizinalbahnen did not generate the returns expected and the state had to bail them out to a large extent, a new statute appeared on 28 April 1882 which introduced a new category of branch line the Sekundärbahn ('secondary line'). These would be constructed at state expense. In fact, only one true Sekundärbahn was built – the line from Gemünden to Hammelberg, now part of a single-track main line. Nevertheless, the name stuck and passed into Bavarian folklore, continuing to be used to refer to branch lines. Although not an official Sekundärbahn, the line from Erlangen to Gräfenberg and its locomotives were nicknamed the Seekuh. The story goes that a railway inn called the Sekundärbahn was having its sign painted. It was left half-finished overnight with only the letters 'Seku' completed. Hence the nickname.

=== The age of the branch line – Lokalbahnen ===
By the 1880s, the Bavarian main line network was largely completed and attention now turned to its expansion into the hinterland. On 21 April 1884, the first Bavarian Lokalbahn ('local line' also spelt Localbahn) law was passed. This went back to the premise that funding for land purchase and construction would be a local affair, although earthworks would be paid for by the state. However, the state would also take the profit.

To make them viable, the Lokalbahnen were to be built and operated as simply as possible. Structures too were to be simple. This led to the widespread use of standard buildings and structures; nevertheless branch lines and their stations still retained a lot of individual character based on the region and local material available for construction.

The real boom period for branch line construction in Bavaria was from 1894 to 1910, a time when more than half of all branch lines were completed. The average time to build was four years and the construction cost worked out at about a fifth that of main lines per kilometre.

Everyday speech saw the introduction of another name in Bavaria for the Vizinal-, Sekundär- and Lokalbahnen: the Nebenbahn, the usual German word for a branch line.

=== The Deutsche Reichsbahn era ===
On 31 March 1920, the state railways (Länderbahnen) were formally merged into the new 'imperial' railway company, the Deutsche Reichsbahn and the branch line network in Bavaria, less a few privately run lines, transferred to the ownership of the German Reich and thereby became part of the Reichsbahn railway network.

But the aftermath of World War I, the state of the economy and rampant inflation brought a halt to any significant further expansion. Of the 52 routes envisaged in 1920, only the stub from Zwiesel to Bodenmais in 1928 and the link from Kinding to Beilngries in 1929 were built.

=== The post-war years ===
The demise of much of the Bavarian branch line network came after the Second World War when competition from the road network and increasing car ownership hit first passenger, then goods services. Around half the original branch lines had closed by the mid-seventies and the trend has continued since, albeit at a slower pace.

== Branch line structures ==
=== Trackbed ===
The Vizinalbahnen used old mainline rails or lightweight, Vizinalbahn rails laid on wooden sleepers. For Lokalbahn lines, the lower speeds enabled a lighter superstructure to be used, for a wheel load of 4.25 to 5 t (4.18 to 4.92 long tons)/4.25 to 5 t (4.68 to 5.51 short tons). By the 1930s, the superstructure of Bavarian branch lines generally consisted of 6 m rails, supplied by the Maximilianshütte at Haidhof, fixed to iron base plates and wooden sleepers with massive rail spikes. The result was a special – lightweight – Bavarian Lokalbahn rail profile.

=== Track layout ===
Although track layouts varied, there were certain standard layouts that were common:

- A halt with a loading loop served by a combined end- and side-loading ramp.
- A terminal station with a kick-back loading siding, served by a ramp at one end and the goods shed at the other. There was a run-around loop for the engine and a crossing loop from which the engine shed and any industrial siding could be accessed.

Any industrial sidings had to be built and maintained by the industries concerned.

=== Halts ===
Many halts just had a name board; sometimes there was a simple shelter with a bench provided by the local council. The railway administration permitted railway 'agents' to operate on many stations, and the standard design of single-storey, wooden, agency building can still be seen today in many places. One side handled the passenger traffic, with a waiting room, ticket office and earth toilet. The other half was the office, goods shed and loading ramp. In epoch 3, these buildings were sometimes extended and more solidly built.

=== Stations ===
Station buildings were often of stone or brick and many appear to be far too large for the villages and towns they serve. In the early days, a standard cubic shape, the so-called Würfel was common, later the design was more variable. Station names could be painted in large letters or carved into long sandstone ashlar slabs on the walls of the building. At the front there is often a shed roof to provide some shelter for waiting passengers on the 'home' platform. The goods shed was often attached.

=== Engine sheds ===
The engine shed was not just a building for housing locomotives. It was a combined 'stable', workshop, office and servicing area, often with living accommodation integrated. There were external locomotive facilities such as cleaning pits, water cranes and nearby coaling bunkers. Inside there were sanding facilities. There was a work table and vice, an office with the duty roster, regulations, operating instructions and other reference material as well as clothes lockers and washing facilities for the staff. Oil was kept in the cellar.

Coaling was carried out by hand from coal bunkers. Coal was shovelled onto a platform and from there into the locomotive's coal tank. Later simple cranes or derricks were installed.

For major repairs, however, the engines were sent to the depot (Bahnbetriebswerk or Bw) and a replacement locomotive provided.

== Locomotives ==
Typical Bavarian branch line locomotives in Epoch 1 include the:

- Class D XI, the classic branch line engine of which over 100 were delivered.
- Class GtL 4/4, a common goods train locomotive for branch lines.
- Class PtL 2/2, nicknamed the 'glass box' (Glaskasten), an unusual design for one-man operation on short lines.
- Class BB II, a Mallet locomotive designed for winding, hilly routes with tight curves.

In Epoch 2, former light main line tank engines were cascaded to the branch lines including the:

- Class Pt 2/3, which became the classic branch line motive power for Epochs 2 and 3.
- Class D XII, which was deployed in small numbers to some lines.

They were joined by new Einheitsdampfloks built for the DRG in the late 1920s and 1930s:

- DRG Class 64, nicknamed Bubikopf ('bob' hairstyle).
- DRG Class 86, its larger cousin.

== Coaches ==
The following are examples of coaches built for the Lokalbahn branch line network:

- BCL Bay 09, long wheelbase passenger coach
- CL Bay 06b, short wheelbase open coach
- PwPost Bay 06, short wheelbase mail van
- CL Bay 11a, long wheelbase open coach
- GwL, short wheelbase goods van

== Goods wagon classification ==
The Bavarian railways, at different times, had three different classification systems that roughly correspond to the early, middle and late period of the state railway era in Bavaria, i.e.:

=== Epoch Ia (1867–92) ===
The early period from 1867 to 1892. Capital letters were used to indicate the type of wagon, e.g. G = open wagon with low sides, short; H= log wagon. Photographs suggest that this system took time to develop and was not fully established until after the Bavarian Ostbahn had been merged into the State Railway in 1877. Roman or Arabic numerals were used additionally to indicate the age of the wagon, e.g. an A I was an old, 6-wheeled, goods van for a load of 12 t (11.8 long tons; 13.2 short tons), whilst an A³ was a 10 m-long (33 ft) 'modern' van for 15 t (14.8 long tons; 16.5 short tons) load (10 t or 9.8 long tons or 11.0 short tons was 'normal') and an H^{2} was a log wagon built between 1860 and 1880. The owner inscription was K.Bay.Sts.B. with a rather square, crowned Bavarian coat of arms (white and blue lozenges).

=== Epoch Ib (1893–1912) ===
Epoch Ib may be viewed as the middle period from 1893 to 1912. The K.Bay. Sts.B. continued to capital letters to indicate the overall category of vehicles, but changed the meanings in some cases to make them more 'intuitive'. For example, G became a covered (Gedeckter) goods van, S were flat wagons (Schienenwagen = rail-carrying wagon) and V were livestock vans (Viehwagen). In addition, lower case letters were used to further define the class of vehicle, indicating e.g. the maximum load, height of the sides etc., and additional axles were indicated by doubling or tripling the letters. So Xm was a departmental wagon with a maximum load over 10 tonnes (9.8 long tons; 11.0 short tons) and SSml was a long, eight-wheeled flat wagon capable of carrying over 10 tonnes. The owner inscription was just K.Bay. Sts.B. without any coat of arms.

=== Epoch Ic (1913–1920) ===
In 1909, the German state railways founded the German State Railway Wagon Association (Deutscher Staatsbahnwagenverband or DSV) in order to enable the free interchange of goods wagons and reduce production and maintenance costs. At the same time standardized wagon numbering, based on the Prussian system, was introduced. In Bavaria, this appears to have been delayed until 1912/13. In addition, Bavaria introduced a naming scheme. Departmental wagons were given the name of their railway division, but others received the name of a Bavarian division depending on their age, type and location. So a modern covered goods wagon with over 15 ton maximum load was designated Gm München. More strikingly, the DSV wagons were supposed to be painted red-brown from 1 January 1911. However this was delayed at least a year in Bavaria and it is likely that green wagons were still around for some time afterwards. Epoch Ic ended with the merging of the state railways into the Deutsche Reichsbahn in the aftermath of World War I. However Bavarian livery could probably continue to be seen for some time afterwards.

== See also ==
- History of rail transport in Germany
- Royal Bavarian State Railways
- List of Bavarian locomotives and railbuses
- List of closed railway lines in Bavaria

== Sources ==
- Zintl, Robert (1977). Bayerische Nebenbahnen. Motorbuch Verlag. ISBN 978-3-87943-531-9.
- Spielhoff, Lothar (January 2017). "Entwicklungsdarstellung des Wagenparks der Bayerischen Staatseisenbahnen". Länderbahnforum. Esslingen-Mettingen.
