= PwPost Bay 06 =

Class of German railway coach

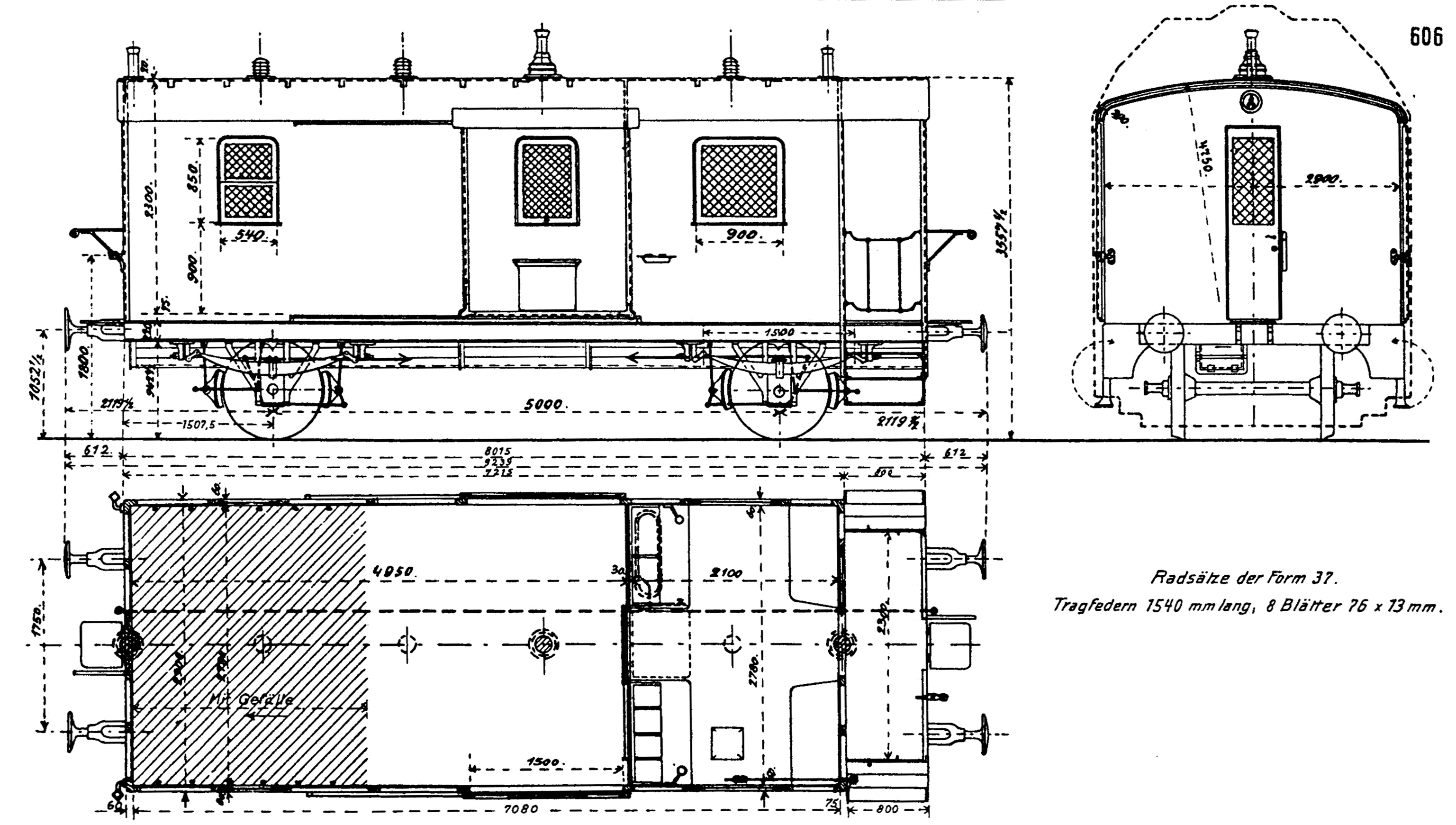
- PwPost Bay 06 - design sheet
- Stock type: Postal/luggage van for local trains
- Manufacturer: Waggonfabrik Josef Rathgeber; MAN
- Constructed: 1906 to 1909
- Retired: to 1963
- Number built: 79
- Design code: PwPostL; PwPost
- Fleet numbers: 21 054 to 21 132

Specifications
- Car length: 7,215 mm (23 ft 8 in) over body; 8,015 mm (26 ft 3 1/2 in) over headstocks; 9,239 mm (30 ft 3 3/4 in) over buffers
- Width: 2,780 mm (9 ft 1 1/2 in)
- Height: 3,557 mm (11 ft 8 in)
- Wheelbase: 5,000 mm (16 ft 4 7/8 in)
- Weight: 8.2 t (8.1 long tons; 9.0 short tons) tare
- Braking system(s): Screw brake Westinghouse
- Coupling system: VDEV screw coupling
- Track gauge: 1,435 mm (4 ft 8 1/2 in)

The PwPost Bay 06 was a combined mail and luggage van designed for Lokalbahn branch line train services with the Royal Bavarian State Railways in the early 20th century. It was built to their Design Sheet Number 606.

== Development ==
As Bavaria's network of Lokalbahn railways grew so did the requirement for suitable coaches for local passenger transport. Because the only motive power available were tank locomotives with low tractive power, such as the PtL 2/2, coaches of a special lightweight construction were needed.

== Procurement ==
Between 1905 and 1911 a total of 281 wagons of classes BL, BCL, CL and PPostL were procured, all of which - except for the wagons of Class PPostL - had a uniform floor plan, open platforms at each end with Dixi gates on the steps and gangways only protected by a single iron railing. Large window panes were fitted instead of the composite windows that had been usual up to that point. They are sometimes referred to as 'the shorts' or 'the short ones' (Die Kurze).

Because the construction of individual mail or luggage vans on the lightly used Lokalbahn routes was too expensive and unnecessary, between 1905 and 1911 87 combined mail/luggage vans were procured, of which 79 were of the type PwPost Bay 06 built to Design Sheet 606. They were delivered in eight batches by the firms of MAN and Rathgeber. Of these vans, three were transferred in 1908 and 1911 to the former Palatine Railways, where they were registered under Sheet Nos. 221 and 223.

== Career ==
Of the original 79 vans, by 1940 five had been retired. A total of 44 were taken over by the DB, who retired them by 1963. As early as 1932 eight vans were converted into PwL Bay 06/32 by the removal of the mail compartment; another nine vans were converted in the years after 1945.

== Design features ==
=== Undercarriage ===
The underframe of the van was made entirely of rivetted steel beams. The outer longitudinal bars had U-profiles with outward facing flanges. The crossbars were also made of U-beams and were not cranked. The vans were fitted with VDEV screw couplings, the drawbar was continuous and sprung in the centre. As buffing equipment the vans originally had two slotted cylinder buffers with an installed length of 650 mm and buffer plates of 360 mm diameter. These were later replaced by plunger buffers. There was an open gangway platform at one end.

=== Running gear ===
The vans had axle boxes of a short, straight design made of rivetted sheet and angled steel. The axles were housed in plain bearing axle boxes. The vans ran on Bavarian Type 37 spoked wheels. In addition to a screw brake there were through air brakes of the Westinghouse type.

=== Body ===
The frame of the van body consisted of wooden posts and beams reinforced by steel straps. The walls were clad with sheet steel externally and wood internally. The side and end walls were straight; the doors inset. The gently curved barrel roof was more rounded at the edges, transitioning smoothly into the side walls but extending like a hood over the gangway. This gangway enabled access to the van from the rest of the train. On both sides there were 1,500 mm wide sliding doors with windows that acted as the loading doors to the luggage compartment. The gangways at the ends were only to be used by railway staff. In 1932 eight vans were converted into pure luggage vans. They were designated as class PwL Bay 06/32. A further nine were also converted to luggage vans after 1945. They were reclassified as PwL Bay 06/xx.

=== Facilities ===
The van body was divided into a mail compartment and a luggage compartment. These compartments were accessible to one another by a central door. The van was lit with paraffin lamps. In the 1930s they were converted to electric lighting. Steam provided the heating. Ventilation was achieved with static ventilators in the roof.

== See also ==
The following coaches were also built for the Lokalbahn branch line network:

- BCL Bay 09, long passenger coach
- CL Bay 06b, short passenger coach
- GwL, goods van
- CL Bay 11a, long passenger coach

== Literature ==
- Wagenpark-Verzeichnis der Kgl. Bayer. Staatseisenbahnen, Aufgestellt nach dem Stande vom 31. März 1913 (in German), 1913
- Wagner, Alto (2015), Bayerische Reisezugwagen (in German) (1. ed.), KIRUBA Verlag, ISBN 978-3-945631-00-3
- Konrad, Emil (1984), Die Reisezugwagen der deutschen Länderbahnen. Band 2 (in German) (1. ed.), Stuttgart: Franckh, ISBN 3-440-05327-X
