= GWL =

GWL may refer to:

- Gardeners' World Live, gardening event in the United Kingdom
- Glasgow Women's Library, Scotland
- Great Wall Airlines, a cargo airline, now merged into China Cargo Airlines
- Great West League, a defunct baseball league
- Great Wolf Lodge, a chain of indoor water parks and hotels in the United States
- Gwalior Airport, in India
- Gwalior Junction railway station, Madhya Pradesh, India
- GwL, class of goods van with the Royal Bavarian State Railways
