= Untersteinach (bei Stadtsteinach) station =

Railway station in Germany

Untersteinach (bei Stadtsteinach)
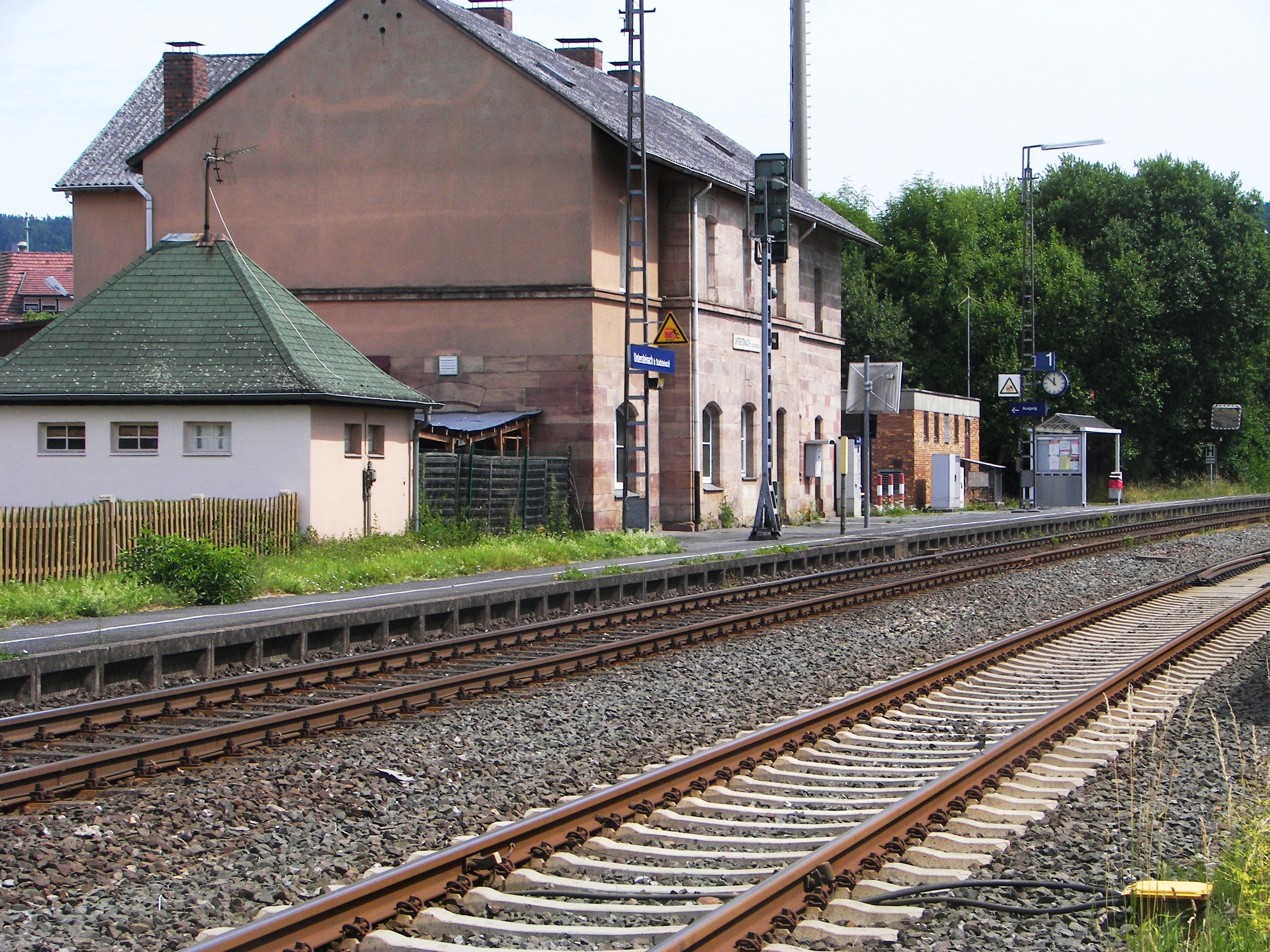
- 2008

General information
- Location: Bahnhofsplatz 3; 95369 Untersteinach; Bavaria; Germany
- Coordinates: 50°07′48″N 11°31′43″E
- Owner: DB Netz
- Operator: DB Station&Service
- Lines: Bamberg–Hof railway (KBS 820/850); Untersteinach–Stadtsteinach railway
- Platforms: 1 side platform
- Tracks: 3

Other information
- Station code: 6366
- DS100 code: NUS
- IBNR: 8006017
- Category: 6
- Website: www.bahnhof.de
Location
- Location within Bavaria

Untersteinach (bei Stadtsteinach) station is a railway station in the municipality of Untersteinach, located in the district of Kulmbach in Middle Franconia, Germany.
