= Kirchenlamitz–Weißenstadt railway =

Overview
- Line number: 5035

Technical
- Line length: 13.5 km (8.4 mi)
- Track gauge: 1,435 mm (4 ft 8 1/2 in)

The Kirchenlamitz–Weissenstadt railway was a German branch line in Bavaria. It was opened on 20 July 1899 as a Sekundärbahn ('secondary line') by the Royal Bavarian State Railways.

The line ran through the northern part of the Upper Franconian rural county (Landkreis) of Wunsiedel from Kirchenlamitz Ost station, on the main line from Hof to Marktredwitz, in a westerly direction steadily climbing uphill into the Lamitz valley to the town of Kirchenlamitz. Around 1910 the town had about 2,200 inhabitants who worked mainly in the granite quarries and the porcelain industry. Continuing uphill the route reached the watershed between the Saale and the Ohře rivers at Buchhaus, 660 m above sea level and the highest point on any railway in Upper Franconia. Its lower-lying terminal station was at Weissenstadt which had 2,870 townsfolk at that time and was situated by the upper reaches of the Ohře south of the Waldstein Mountains chain, a part of the Fichtel Mountains. At one time there were mines here. At the end of a 1.4 km long goods line was a loading yard which was mainly used for loading logs from the Schneeberg region.

Passenger services on 13.5 km long route were stopped on 28 May 1972. At the end of 1993 goods traffic also ceased and the line was dismantled.

== See also ==
- Royal Bavarian State Railways
- Bavarian branch lines
- List of closed railway lines in Bavaria
