= Untersteinach–Stadtsteinach railway =

Railway line in Upper Franconia, Germany

Untersteinach–Stadtsteinach

Overview
- Line number: 5004

Service
- Route number: 418g

Technical
- Line length: 4.8 km (3 mi)
- Track gauge: 1,435 mm (4 ft 8 1/2 in)
- Minimum radius: 300 m (984 ft)
- Maximum incline: 2.08 %

The Untersteinach–Stadtsteinach railway is a branch line in the Bavarian province of Upper Franconia in southern Germany. It links the former district town of Stadtsteinach with the main line from Bamberg to Hof.

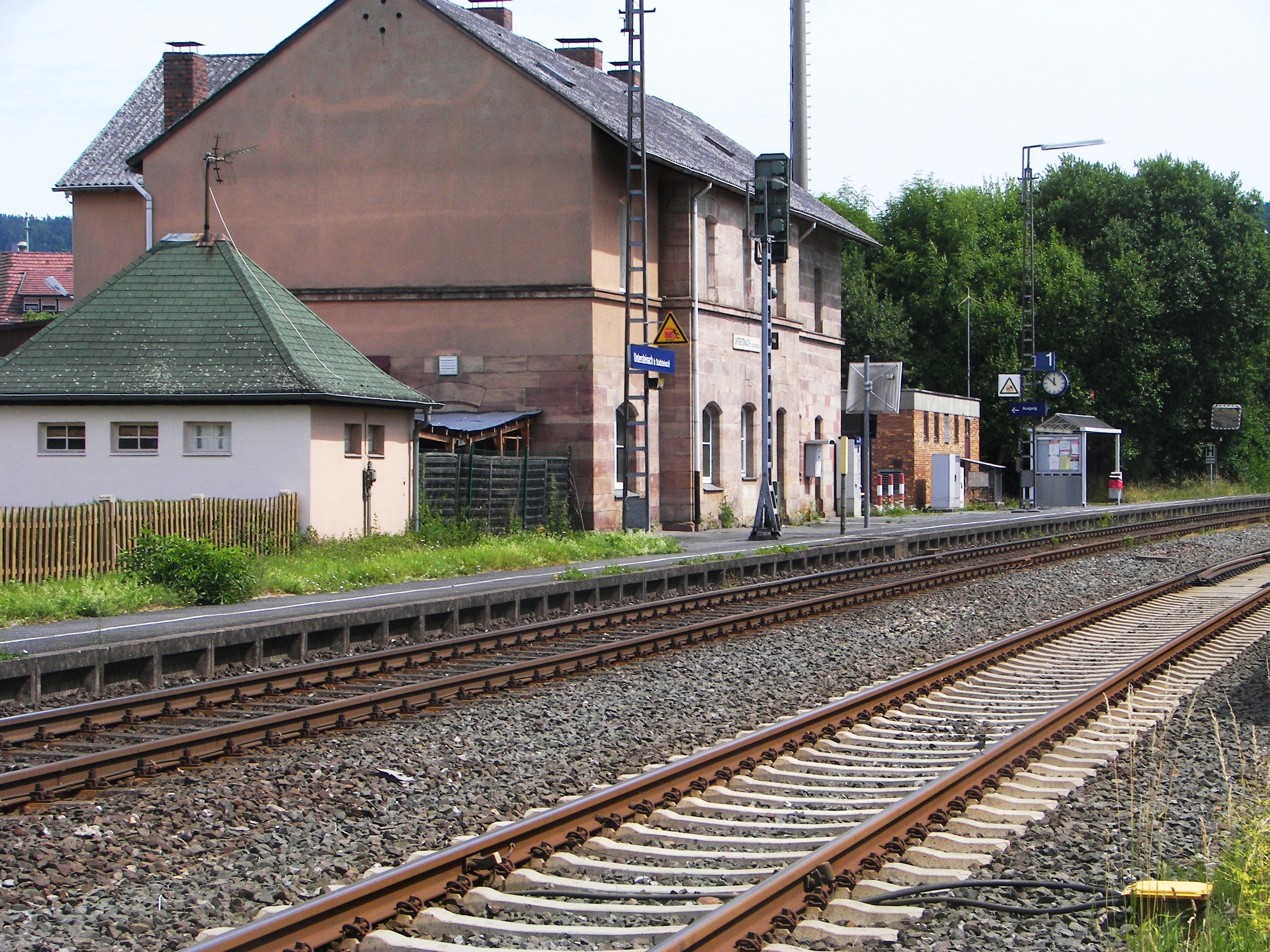
The station at Untersteinach in July 2008

The standard gauge, single-tracked Lokalbahn is 4.8 km long and was opened for goods traffic on 26 November 1913 by the Royal Bavarian State Railways. For almost 30 years it was used to transport goods, mainly ballast for the construction of railways. Not until the lack of fuel in the Second World War brought buses to a halt was a passenger service offered on 19 July 1943 using a coach attached to the goods train. This was provided at the instigation (and risk) of the town authorities until 13 April 1945 and thus never appeared in the German railway timetable. There were no intermediate stations on the line.

After the war the Nuremberg railway division laid on three pairs of passenger trains daily on workdays from 16 January 1947. In summer 1949 Sunday passenger services were introduced (two pairs) which ran to and from Kulmbach. As economic conditions improved, passengers turned back to the buses and also to private vehicles, so that in the 1956 summer timetable only two pairs of trains ran on workdays. Even these disappeared on 30 September 1956. Since then the railway has become purely a goods line once more.
