= GwL =

- Constructed: 1885 to 1906
- Number built: 258
- Design code: PwL bay 96
- Fleet numbers: DRG nos. from 1923: 8827-8835, 8860-8869, 8899-8911, 8932-8939, 8956-8962, 9038-9855, 9130-9144, 9237-9270, 9357-9365, 9470-9483, 9513-9539, 9610-9624

Specifications
- Car length: 8,224–8,624 mm (26 ft 11 3/4 in – 28 ft 3 1/2 in)
- Width: 200 mm (7 7/8 in) narrower than the 'shorts' (e.g. CL Bay 06b).
- Wheelbase: 3,630–4,500 mm (11 ft 10 7/8 in – 14 ft 9 1/8 in)
- Track gauge: 1,435 mm (4 ft 8 1/2 in)

The GwL class vans of the Royal Bavarian State Railways were goods vans built for branch lines in the Kingdom of Bavaria in the late 19th and early 20th centuries.

== Procurement ==
The branch lines in Bavaria were generally known as Lokalbahnen, literally "local railways", and were of particularly light construction entailing the use of lightweight rolling stock. Between 1884 and 1906, 258 vans of the class GwL were built for this purpose in a number of batches each with a different designation.

== Description ==
The GwL class were covered vans which had the appearance of Lokalbahn coaching stock, including similar lettering. The vans were had open platforms at both ends. Access to the loading area was either via a pair of hinged doors or a single door in the centre of the side walls. On either side of the doors was a window. The wheelbase of the earliest vans was 3.63 m, but was later increased to 3.8 and eventually 4.5 m. The overall length also increased from 8.224 m to 8.624 m.

== See also ==
The following coaches were also built for the Lokalbahn branch line network:

- BCL Bay 09, long passenger coach
- CL Bay 06b, short passenger coach
- CL Bay 11a, long passenger coach
- PwPost Bay 06, mail/luggage van

== Literature ==
- Konrad, Emil (1984). Die Reisezugwagen der deutschen Länderbahnen, Band 2: Bayern, Württemberg, Baden. Stuttgart: Franckh'sche Verlagshandlung W.Keller & Co. ISBN 9783440053270
