= Lokalbahn =

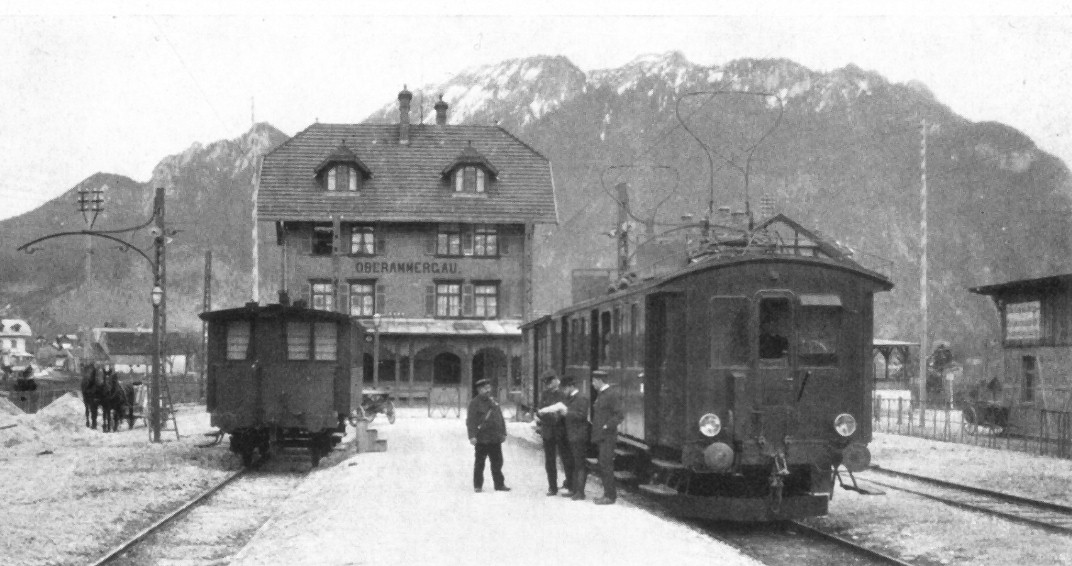
Electric railcar of the Murnau–Oberammergau Lokalbahn

A Lokalbahn or Localbahn ("local line", plural: -en) is a secondary railway line worked by local trains serving rural areas, typically in Austria and the south German states of Bavaria and Baden-Württemberg. Lokalbahnen appeared at the end of the 19th century before the use of cars became widespread.

== Development ==
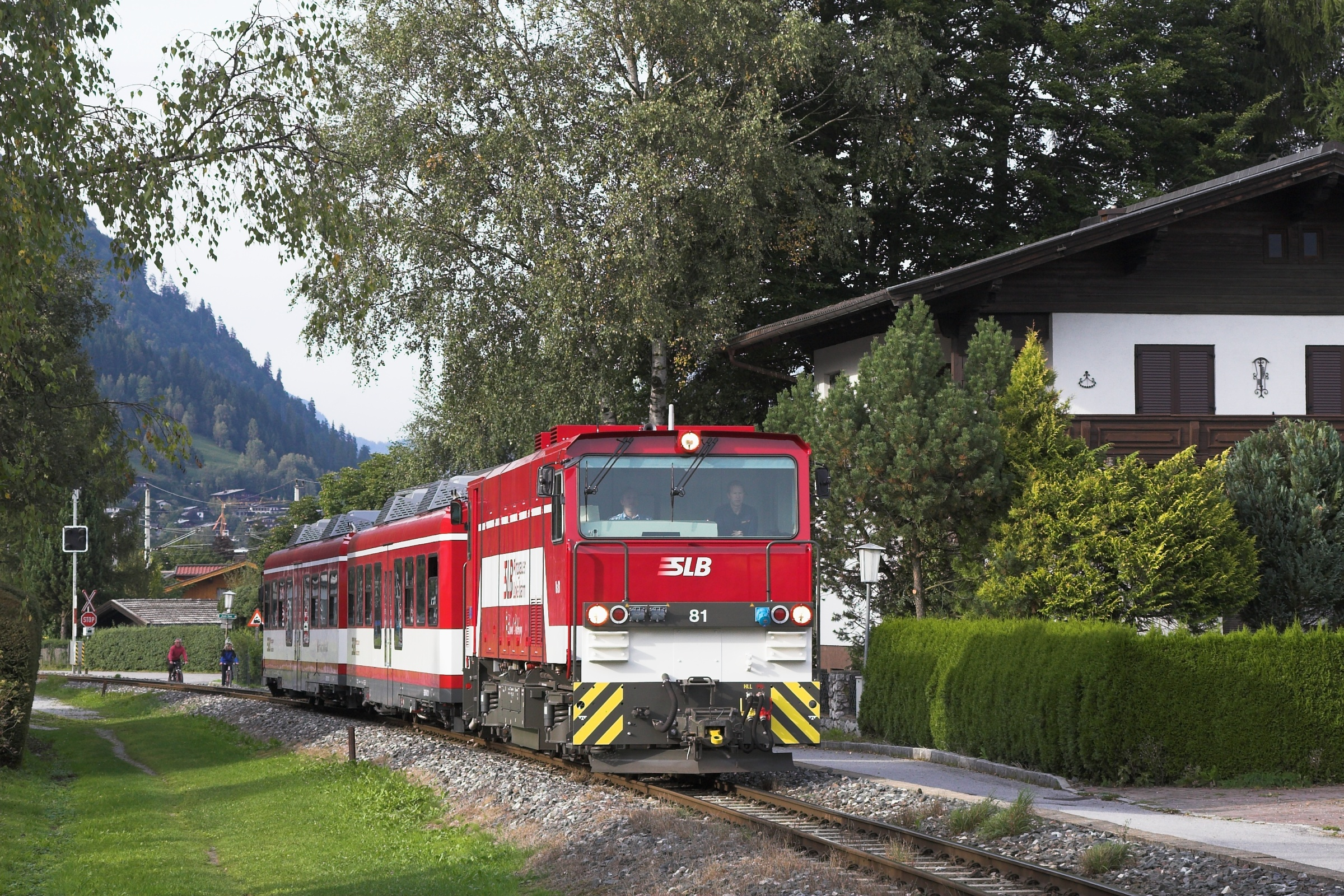
Modern operations on the Pinzgauer Lokalbahn

Because the construction and operation of main line railways was not always covered by their income, simpler solutions were sought. As early as 1865 the engineering conference of the Union of German Railway Administrations (Verein Deutscher Eisenbahnverwaltungen) had set out the principles for secondary lines. These were enshrined in law in 1878 with the Railway Act for German Railways of Secondary Importance (Bahnordnung für deutsche Eisenbahnen untergeordneter Bedeutung).

=== Bavaria ===
By the 1880s, the Bavarian main line network was largely completed and attention now turned to its expansion into the hinterland. On 21 April 1884 the first Bavarian Lokalbahn (also spelt Localbahn) law was passed. This was based on the premise that funding for land purchase and construction would be a local affair, although earthworks would be paid for by the state. However, the state would also take the profit.

To make them viable, the Lokalbahnen were to be built and operated as simply as possible. Structures too were to be simple. This led to the widespread use of standard buildings and structures; nevertheless branch lines and their stations still retained a lot of individual character based on the region and local material available for construction.

The real boom period for branch line construction in Bavaria was from 1894 to 1910, a time when more than half of all branch lines were completed. The average time to build was four years and the construction cost per kilometre worked out at about one fifth that of main lines.

The Lokalbahnen in Bavaria were built to standard gauge and, initially, an axle load of just 10 tons.

== Characteristics ==
A Lokalbahn line typically began at a station on the main line and ran, as a branch line, to the next largest town. On the lowland plateaus of Bavaria, for example, many market towns and other towns were linked to the railway network by Lokalbahnen.

In keeping with their secondary status and simplified regulations the following simplifications were made to improve their economy compare with the main lines:

- lower axle loads, narrower rail gauges (in some areas) and lower speeds
- fewer regulations, simpler signalling
- Mixed train operations (passenger coaches and goods wagons in one train)

From the 1950s, increasing bus and car traffic led to the closure of branch lines, including numerous lines built as Lokalbahnen. Several routes continue to be operated today as heritage railways. Sometimes lines that are still referred to today as Lokalbahnen have been upgraded into modern modes of transportation and local means of public transport. In Vienna, the Badner Bahn still carries its Lokalbahn designation, despite operationally being a modern tram-train line.

== Rolling stock ==
=== Goods vans ===
Between 1884 and 1906, over 250 lightweight goods vans were built for the Lokalbahnen. They were designated as class GwL and had open end-platforms at both ends and either hinged or sliding doors in the centre of the side walls. On either side of the side doors were windows.

=== Light trains ===
The following coaches and wagons were intended for operation with the light twin-axled 'motor locomotives' (Motorlokomotiven) such as the Glaskasten. The coaches were built between 1905 and 1911 and were unsuitable for military transport. They had open end-platforms with Lokalbahn steps and open gangways. The coaches were equipped with a screw brake on the end-platform, Westinghouse brakes, paraffin lamps and steam heating.

Lokalbahn coaches for light trains (1905–1911)
Sheet (1913)	Class (from 1893)	Coach numbers (K.B.Sts.B.) (Note: Numbers based on the scheme in use from 1893.)	Manufacturer	Quantity	Years of manufacture	Drawing (DRG)	Coach numbers (DRG)	Sections by class	Toilets	Length over buffers [mm]	Wheelbase [mm]	Remarks
499	BL	23004, 23005	Rathgeber	2	1907	BL Bay 07	9626, 9627	2 ¾	1	9.024	5.000	For services to the state spa of Bad Brückenau
523	BCL	20048-20071	Rathgeber	24	1905	BCL Bay 05; CL Bay 05; CL Bay 05/20	9693, 9694; 9493-9799 (Note: Not all numbers; for details see the coach design sheet (Wagenblatt).)	2 / 1 ¾	1	8.904	5.000	
568	CL	20643-20787	Rathgeber	17	1906–1911	CL Bay 06a	9556-9874	3 ¾	1	8.834	5.000	
569	CL	20628-20795	Rathgeber	74	1905–1911	CL Bay 05a		2 ¼ Sliding door compartment	1	8.834	5.000	
570	CL	20655-20782	Rathgeber	75	1906–1911	CL Bay 06b		2 ¼ Guard's compartment	1	8.834	5.000	
605	PPostL	21046-21053	Rathgeber	8	1905/06	PwPost Bay 05	9504-9602	B / P / KV (Note: B = letters compartment / P = packets compartment)		8.374	4.500	
606	PPostL	21054-21132	Rathgeber; MAN	79	1906–1909	PwPost Bay 06	9603-9890	B / P		9.239	5.000	Two coaches were delivered to the Palatine network, Sheet No. 221

== See also ==
- Lokalbahnen in Bavaria
- Bavarian Localbahn Society
- Tyrolean Museum Railways
- Sekundärbahn
- Vizinalbahn
- Kleinbahn
- Lokalbahn AG

== Sources ==
- Walter Ledig, Ferdinand Ulbricht: Die Sekundär-Eisenbahnen des Königreichs Sachsen, Berlin 1887 (Digitalisat)
- Th. Sorge: Die Secundärbahnen in Ihrer Bedeutung und Anwendung für das Königreich Sachsen, Dresden 1875 (Digitalisat)
- Wolf L. Temming: Nebenbahnen: eine Epoche deutscher Eisenbahngeschichte, Transpress, Berlin 1993
