= Bavarian PtL 2/2 =

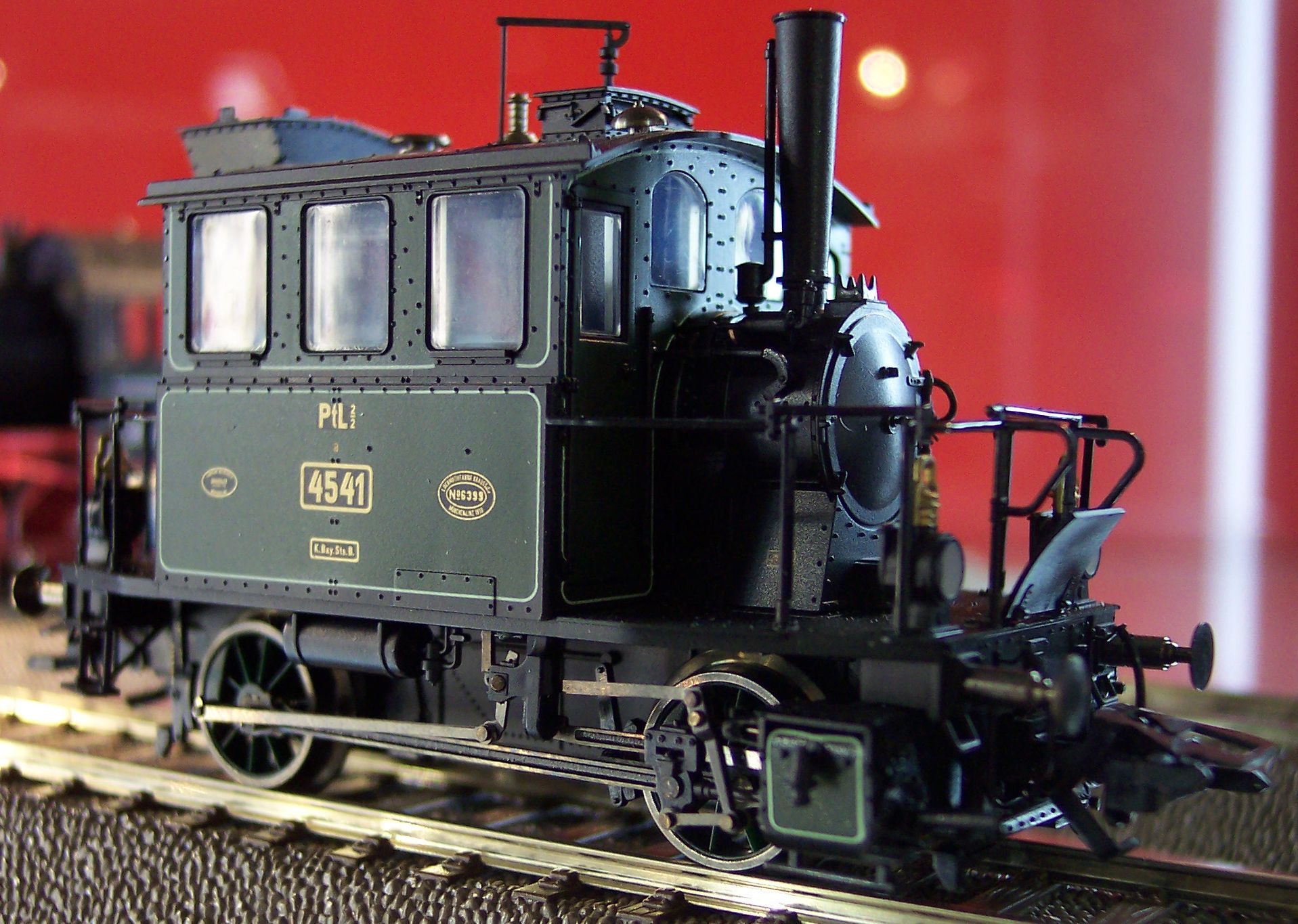
Model of a PtL 2/2

The Class PtL 2/2 locomotives of the Royal Bavarian State Railways (Königlich Bayerische Staatseisenbahn) were light and very compact superheated steam locomotives for operation on Bavarian branch lines (known generally as Lokalbahnen). There were three types in total, of which two were transferred to the Deutsche Reichsbahn-Gesellschaft as Class 98.3 tank locomotives and even survived to join the Deutsche Bundesbahn fleet after the Second World War.

Common to all the variants was the B axle arrangement (European or UIC classification) or 0-4-0 (Whyte notation), the semi-automatic, gravity-feed firing that enabled one-man operation, and platforms with guard rails, front and rear, that enabled safe access to the coaches. The locomotives had a large driver's cab with 3 windows per side that surrounded the entire locomotive boiler as far as the smokebox. This unique feature earned it the nickname Glaskasten ("glass box") or, in Franconia, Glas-Chaise ("glass carriage").

== 1905 version ==
Bavarian PtL 2/2 (1905 version)
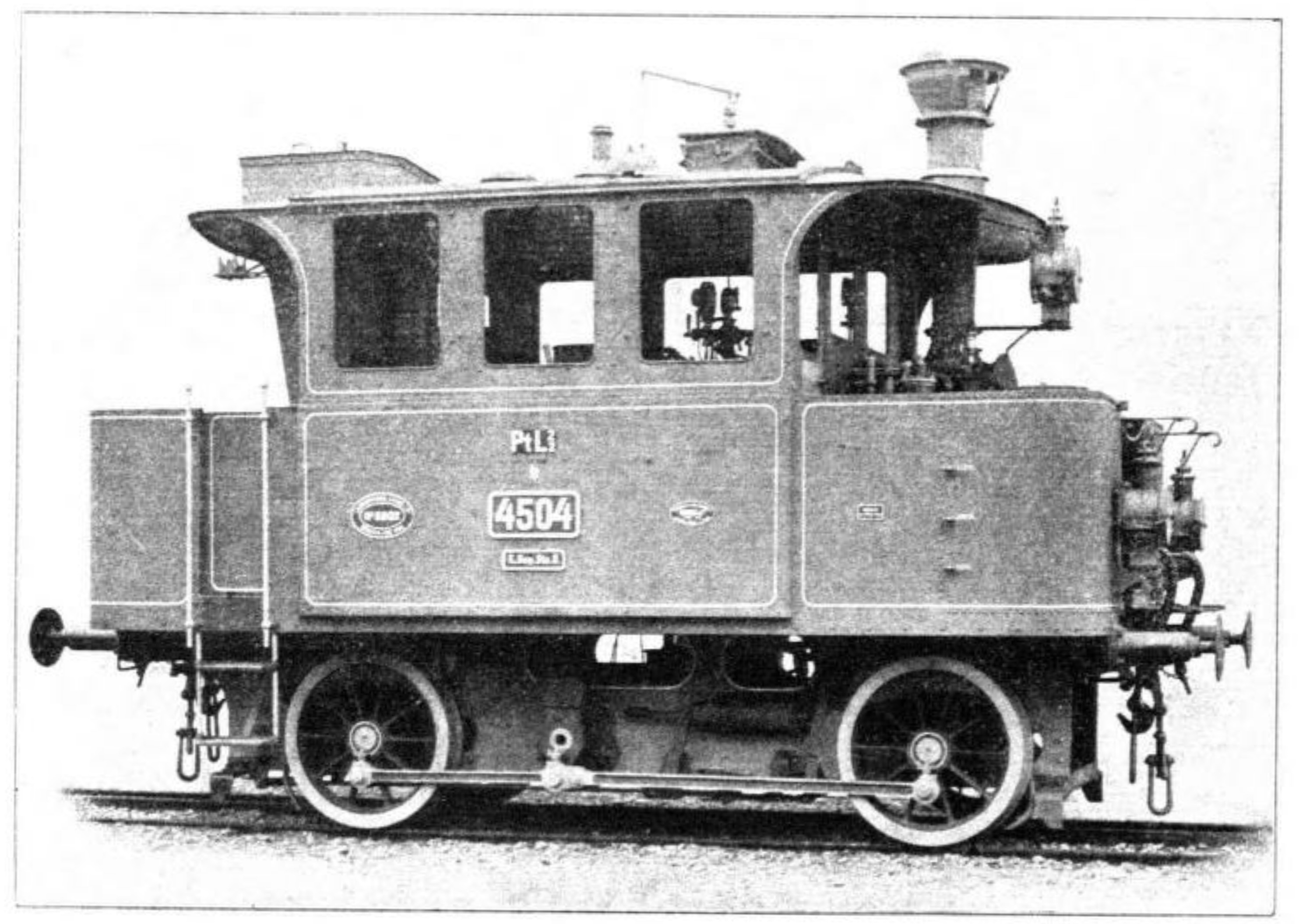
Type and origin
- Builder: Krauss
- Build date: 1905–1906
- Total produced: 6
Specifications
- Configuration
  - Whyte: 0-4-0T
  - UIC: B h2t
- Gauge: 1,435 mm (4 ft 8 1/2 in)
- Driver dia.: 1,006 mm (3 ft 3 5/8 in)
- Length
  - Over beams: 7,004 mm (22 ft 11 3/4 in)
- Axle load: 10.6 t (10.4 long tons; 11.7 short tons)
- Adhesive weight: 21.3 t (21.0 long tons; 23.5 short tons)
- Service weight: 21.3 t (21.0 long tons; 23.5 short tons)
- Boiler pressure: 12 kg/cm^{2} (1,180 kPa; 171 lbf/in^{2})
- Heating surface
  - Firebox: 0.60 m^{2} (6.5 sq ft)
  - Evaporative: 37.00 m^{2} (398.3 sq ft)
- High-pressure cylinder: 365 mm (14 3/8 in)
- Low-pressure cylinder: 305 mm (12 in)
- Piston stroke: 400 mm (15 3/4 in)
- Loco brake: Air brake
Performance figures
- Maximum speed: 50 km/h (31 mph)
Career
- Numbers: 4501–4506
- Retired: 1923

In both 1905 and 1906 Krauss supplied three locomotives (numbers 4501–4506) with an inside driving gear arranged inside the frame and between the axles. The three machines built in 1906 had their cylinder diameter increased from 285 to 305 mm (11.2 to 12.0 in). The two axles were driven via a jackshaft and external connecting rods. Unlike the better-known later variants the water tank of this 'ancient glass box' (Ur-Glaskasten) was arranged over the gangway, but in such a way that crossing over to the coaches in the train was still possible.

A rival design for this locomotive was the Bavarian ML 2/2 that was built by Maffei.

In the Reichsbahn's provisional renumbering plan of 1923, all six locomotives were included as numbers 98 301 - 98 306; they were however taken out of service in the same year. The reason for that was the difficulty of accessing the inside driving gear for maintenance work.

== 1908 and 1911 versions ==
Bavarian PtL 2/2 (1908–1914 version) DRG Class 98.3 ÖBB 688
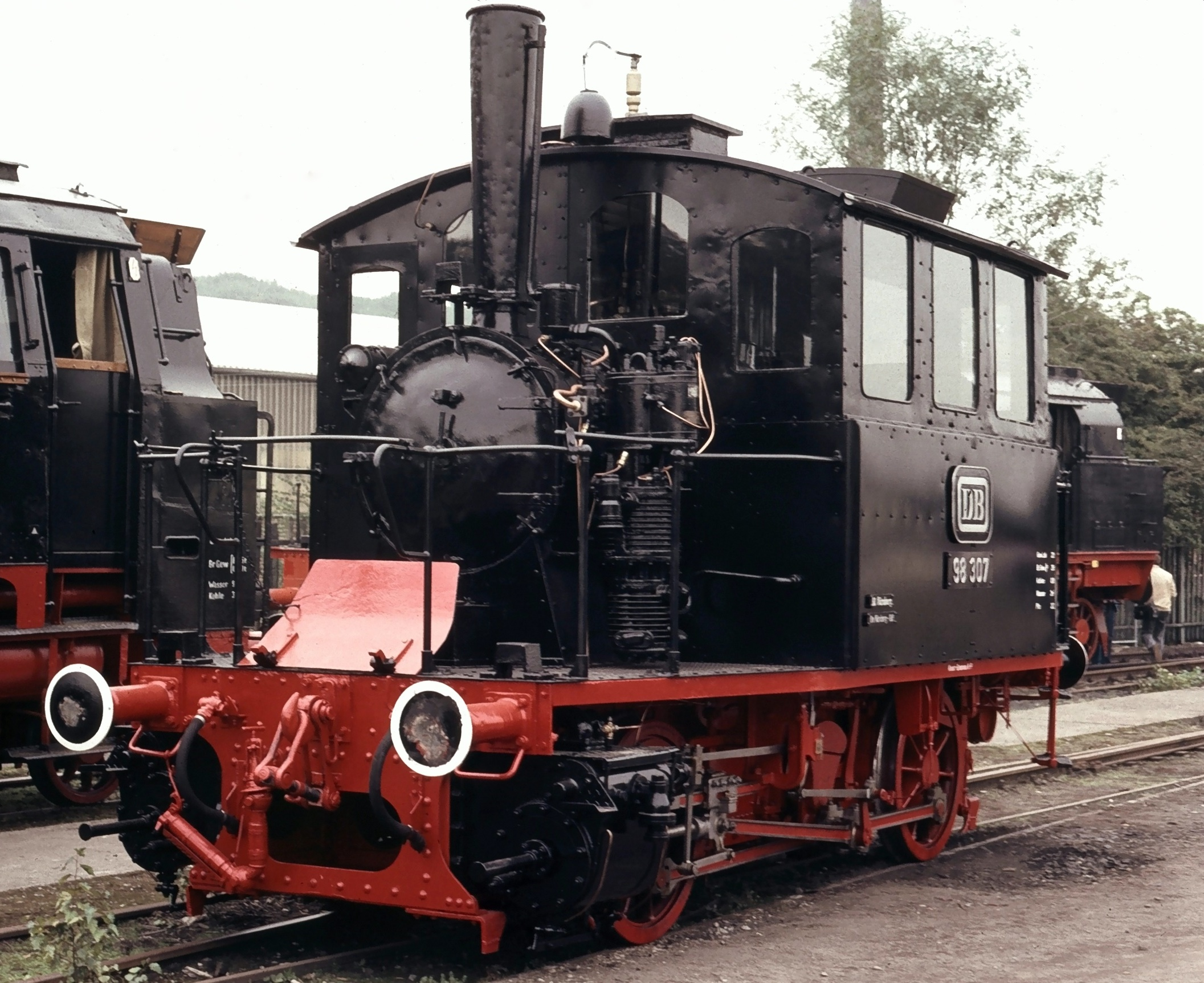
- DB 98 307 in Bochum-Dahlhausen (1985)
Type and origin
- Builder: Krauss
- Build date: 1908–1914
- Total produced: 42
Specifications
- Configuration
  - Whyte: 0-4-0T
  - UIC: B h2t
- Driver dia.: 1,006 mm (3 ft 3 5/8 in)
- Length
  - Over beams: 7,004 or 6,800 mm (22 ft 11 3/4 in or 22 ft 3 3/4 in)
- Axle load: 13.5 or 11.0 t (13.3 or 10.8 long tons; 14.9 or 12.1 short tons)
- Adhesive weight: 22.7 or 22.1 t (22.3 or 21.8 long tons; 25.0 or 24.4 short tons)
- Service weight: 22.7 or 22.1 t (22.3 or 21.8 long tons; 25.0 or 24.4 short tons)
- Boiler pressure: 12 kg/cm^{2} (1,180 kPa; 171 lbf/in^{2})
- Heating surface
  - Firebox: 0.60 m^{2} (6.5 sq ft)
  - Evaporative: 28.90 m^{2} (311.1 sq ft)
- Cylinder size: 320 mm (12 5/8 in)
- Piston stroke: 400 mm (15 3/4 in)
- Loco brake: compressed air
Performance figures
- Maximum speed: 50 km/h (31 mph)
- Indicated power: 210 PS (154 kW; 207 hp)
Career
- Numbers: K.Bay.Sts.E: 4507–4535; DRG: 98 301 – 98 322; ÖBB: 688.01
- Retired: 1963

In 1908 and 1909 Krauss supplied 29 locomotives with a conventional outside driving gear, which nevertheless used a jack shaft between the main axles. They were given locomotive numbers 4507 to 4535. This driving gear enabled the water tank to be located below the boiler in the frame, so that there was more space on the gangways.

Three further locomotives of this type were procured by the Prussian state railways in 1910 and were designated as the Prussian Class T 2.

In 1911 and 1914 two further batches of nine and four locomotives were supplied to the Royal Bavarian State Railways. On these, the jackshaft was left out and the wheelbase reduced from 3,200 to 2,700 mm (10 ft 6 in to 8 ft 10 in). These engines were also shorter and lighter than overall the versions built up to 1909.

The Deutsche Reichsbahn-Gesellschaft took over 22 locomotives, numbering them 98 301 - 98 322. Nine of these came from the first series with the jackshaft.

== Survivors ==
Two locomotives were sold to industrial firms in 1942, one was a victim of the Second World War and the engine number 98 304 stayed in Austria after the war. It was designated as Class ÖBB 688.01 by the Austrian Federal Railways (Österreichische Bundesbahn). This engine was taken out of service in 1959.

The remaining locomotives entered the Deutsche Bundesbahn, and were mostly withdrawn during the 1950s.

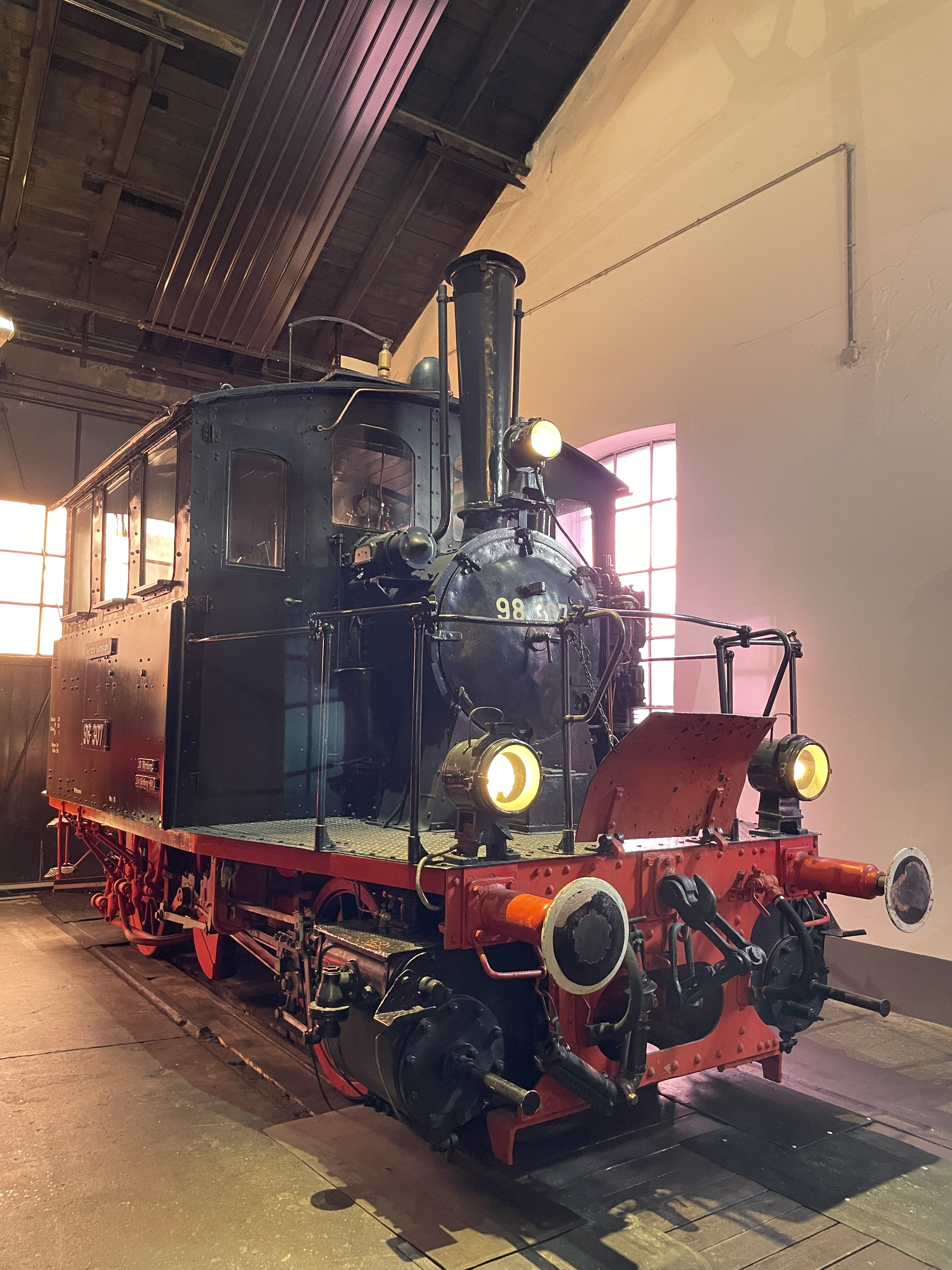
Bavarian PtL 2/2 (BR 98 307) in the German Steam Locomotive Museum in Neuenmarkt-Wirsberg

Number 98 307 was deployed until 1963 between Spalt and Georgensgmünd and was known as the 'Spalter Goat' (Spalter Bockel). It has been preserved and is kept at the German Steam Locomotive Museum (Deutsches Dampflokomotiv-Museum or DDM) in Neuenmarkt-Wirsberg on loan from the Nuremberg Transport Museum (Verkehrsmuseum Nürnberg), but is no longer working.

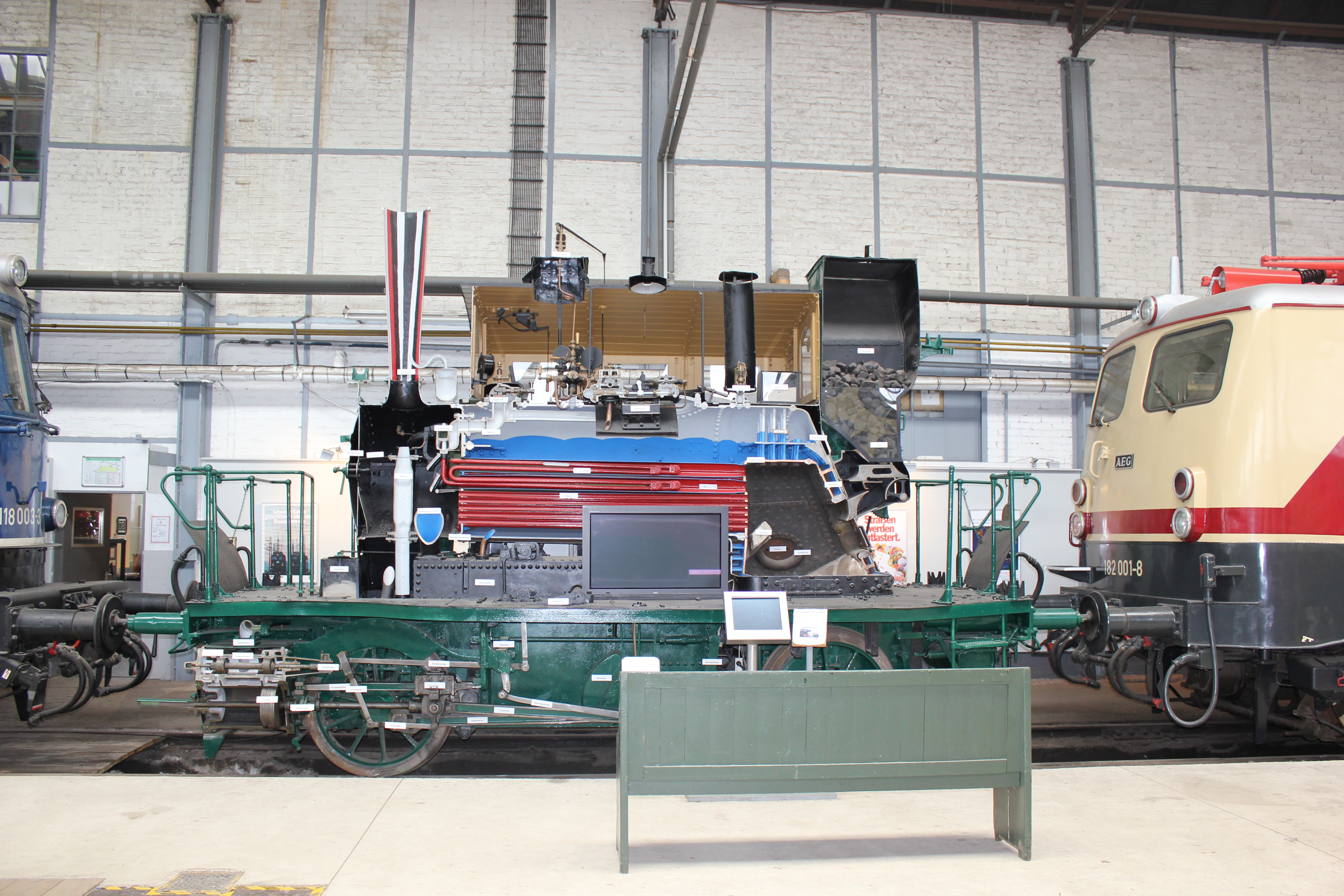
4515 in the DB Museums Koblenz Lützel

=== 4515 ===
A second engine, numbered "4515", had been cut in cross-section to explain the internal workings of a steam locomotive. It was an unfortunate victim of the great fire at the Nuremberg Shed in October 2005, but after a successful renovation is now displayed in the DB Museum, Koblenz.

=== 98 321 ===
In 1938 locomotive no. 98 321 went via a locomotive dealer and the Lower Saxon State Railway Office to the Verden-Walsrode Railway. They had it modified in 1947 at Krupp's: the armatures were moved to the rear of the outer firebox and housed in a normal driver's cab; gravity-fed firing was converted to normal firing with a firebox door. This work was completed in 1950 in Verden, before it went into service as locomotive no. 298. On the running plate, two former air cylinders were mounted as additional water tanks. Its period of duty was short, however. By early 1956 the locomotive was taken out of service and sold to a scrap merchant.
