= Waggonfabrik Josef Rathgeber =

Railway coach manufacturer

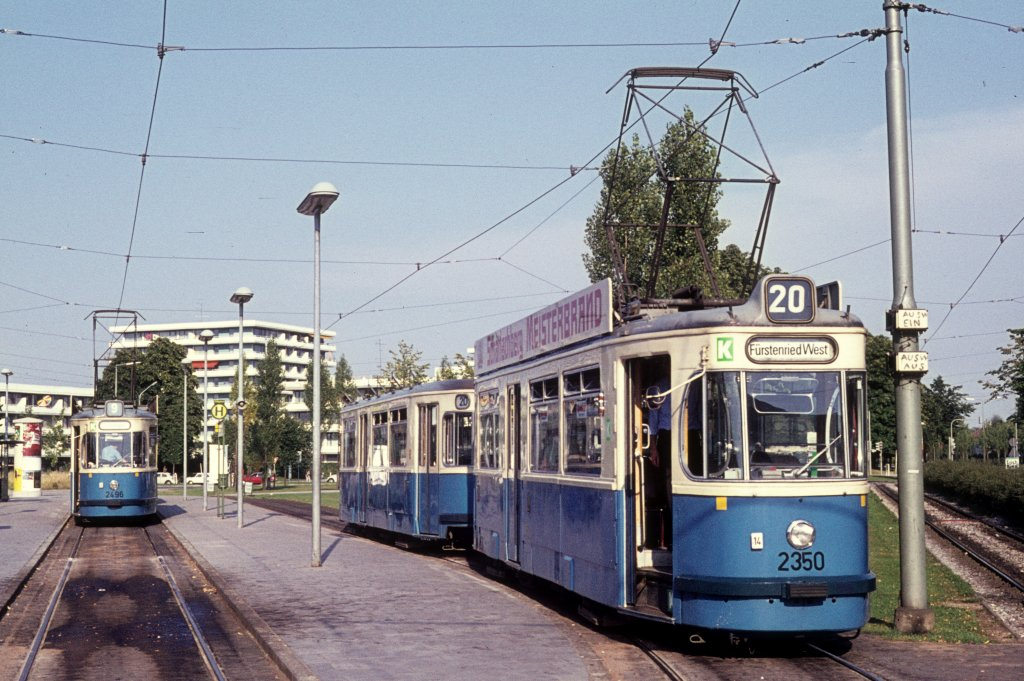
Rathgeber built 286 Munich trams

Waggonbaufabrik Josef Rathgeber was a railway coach manufacturer, founded in 1852 in Munich, which closed in 1972. It produced railway vehicles, buses, elevators and automatic doors. In 1972 it was taken over by Firma F. X. Meiller, who use the former factory, Rathgeber-Werk, in München-Moosach to make tilting devices for construction vehicles.
