= Union of German Railway Administrations =

The Union of German Railway Administrations (German: Verein Deutscher Eisenbahnverwaltungen) or VDEV emerged in 1847 from the Association of Prussian Railways (Verband der preußischen Eisenbahnen), which had been founded on 10 November 1846 by the ten Prussian railway administrations in order to simplify the standardisation of resources, equipment and regulations between the individual administrations.

From 1932 it operated under the name of the Union of Central European Railway Administrations (Verein Mitteleuropäischer Eisenbahnverwaltungen) or VMEV.
