= List of closed railway lines in Bavaria =

This is a list of closed railway lines in Bavaria.

== Cessation of passenger services on railway lines in Bavaria since 1950 ==
=== 1950s ===
Year	Date	Section	Route	Length	Remarks
1950	14 May	Coburg-Görsdorf	Werra Railway (Thuringia)	12.8 km to border	
1952	29 May	Pressig-Rothenkirchen–Tettau	Pressig-Rothenkirchen–Tettau	16.80 km	
1953	1 December		Wolnzach Bf–Geisenfeld	9.3 km	
1954	3 October	Neuses-Weißenbrunn	Neuses-Weißenbrunn	5.0 km	
1955	22 May	Bodenwöhr-Nittenau	Bodenwöhr Nord–Nittenau	10.7 km	
	22 May		Feucht–Wendelstein	5.3 km	
	2 October		Beilngries–Kipfenberg	16.9 km	
1956	June		Gundelfingen-Sontheim		
	30 September		Untersteinach–Stadtsteinach	4.8 km	
1959	31 May		Beuerberg–Bichl	13.5 km	
	30 September		Floß–Flossenbürg	6.2 km	
	4 October		Rottershausen–Stadtlauringen	16.9 km	

=== 1960s ===
- 1960
  - 29 May: Pfaffenhausen–Kirchheim (Swabia), 6.9 km / Fünfstetten–Monheim, 6.3 km / Eichstätt Stadt–Kipfenberg, 29.4 km
  - 27 June: Gasseldorf–Heiligenstadt, 10.9 km
  - 18 July: Greißelbach–Freystadt, 9.8 km
  - 2 October: Dollnstein–Rennertshofen, 21.0 km / Dettelbach Bf–Dettelbach Stadt, 5.5 km / Regensburg-Reinhausen–Wörth, 19.9 km / Tutting–Kößlarn, 9.8 km
  - 1 December: Röthenbach–Weiler, 5.8 km
- 1961
  - 28 May: Frensdorf–Ebrach, 28.7 km
  - 19 June: Eschenau–Neunkirchen am Brand, 6.7 km
  - 21 December: Brannenburg–Waching (Wendelsteinbahn), 2.3 km
- 1962
  - 1 July: Grafenwöhr Bf–Kirchenthumbach, 15.2 km / Amberg–Lauterhofen, 28.4 km / Aufhausen–Kröhstorf, 14.6 km
  - 30 September: Vilshofen–Aidenbach, 12.5 km / Vilshofen–Ortenburg, 10.9 km
- 1963
  - 18 February: Erlangen–Neunkirchen am Brand, 12.3 km
  - 26 May: Marktoberdorf–Lechbruck, 22.3 km / Waldkirchen–Haidmühle, 26.8 km
  - 29 September: Hörpolding–Traunreut, 2.9 km (reactivated 2006)
- 1964
  - 31 May: Munich Isartalbf–Großhesselohe Isartalbf, 5.6 km
  - 27 September: Landau (Isar)–Arnstorf, 25.5 km / Kellmünz–Babenhausen, 10.3 km
- 1965
  - 25 September: Erlau–Wegscheid, 20.1 km
- 1966
  - 1 May: Berchtesgaden Königsseer Bf–Königssee, 4.3 km
  - 21 May: Mellrichstadt–Mühlfeld, 5.0 km
  - 1 July: Amberg–Schmidmühlen, 23.7 km
  - 25 September: Röthenbach–Scheidegg, 9.9 km / Senden–Weißenhorn, 9.6 km / Dinkelscherben–Thannhausen, 13.9 km
  - 28 November: Leutershausen-Wiedersbach–Bechhofen, 22.7 km
- 1967
  - 30 January: Bieberehren–Creglingen, 6.0 km
  - 1 February: Maxhütte-Haidhof–Burglengenfeld, 6.9 km / Sinzing–Alling, 4.1 km / Beilngries–Dietfurt, 10.0 km
- 1968
  - 25 May: Obernburg-Elsenfeld–Heimbuchenthal, 16.8 km / Dorfen–Velden 20.5 km / Endorf–Obing, 18.5 km (approved in July 2005 for privately run operations, see Chiemgau Railway) / Übersee–Marquartstein, 8.0 km
  - 29 September: Seligenstadt–Volkach, 10.6 km / Eggmühl–Langquaid, 10.3 km (museum railway today) /Thann-Matzbach–Haag, 18.0 km
- 1969
  - 1 June: Wolnzach Bf–Mainburg, 23.4 km / Simbach–Pocking, 28.4 km
  - 27 September: Enzelhausen–Unterzolling, 4.0 km / Georgensgmünd–Spalt, 7.0 km / Pilsting–Marklkofen, 18.9 km / Wiesmühl–Tittmoning, 6.0 km
  - 13 December: Bodenwöhr Nord–Rötz, 28.4 km

=== 1970s ===
- 1970
  - 31 January: Ranna–Auerbach, 8.1 km
  - 31 May: Grafing Bf–Glonn, 10.6 km
  - 27 September: Passau–Hauzenberg, 24 km / Neumarkt-St.Veit–Frontenhausen-Marklkofen, 23.2 km / (Rosenheim–)Landl–Frasdorf, 19 km
- 1971
  - 22 May: Mellrichstadt Bf–Mühlfeld
  - 25 September: Rothenburg ob der Tauber–Dombühl, 26 km / Münchberg–Zell, 10.2 km / Großhabersdorf–Unternbibert-Rügland (the so-called Bibertbahn), 14.3 km
  - 25 September: Münchberg-Zell/Ofr. (PV)
- 1972
  - 28 May: Reuth–Erbendorf Nord, 7 km / Wolfratshausen–Beuerberg, 11 km / Memmingen–Legau, 17 km / Ingolstadt–Riedenburg, 39 km / Thalmässing–Greding, 12 km / Kirchenlamitz Ost–Weißenstadt, 14 km.
  - 1 October: Stockheim–Burggrub, 5 km / Eging–Kalteneck, 20.7 km / Schongau–Kaufbeuren, 31 km / Ungerhausen–Ottobeuren, 11 km
- 1973
  - 3 June: Bayreuth Altstadt–Thurnau, 21 km / Burgthann–Allersberg, 15 km / Langenbach–Unterzolling, 7 km
  - 30 September: Falls–Gefrees, 5 km / Naila–Schwarzenbach am Wald, 10 km / Bad Aibling–Feilnbach, 12 km
- 1974
  - 26 May: Aschaffenburg Süd–Höchst (Odenwald), 29.8 km / Neuenmarkt-Wirsberg–Bischofsgrün, 21 km / Landshut–Rottenburg (Laaber), 28 km
  - 29 September: Bayreuth–Hollfeld, 27 km / Hilpoltstein–Thalmässing, 16 km / Ochsenfurt–Weikersheim, 36 km
- 1975
  - 1 June: Ebersdorf–Fürth am Berg, 23 km / Floß–Eslarn, 40 km
  - 28 September: Breitengüßbach–Dietersdorf, 32 km / Holenbrunn–Leupoldsdorf, 11 km / Tirschenreuth–Bärnau, 13 km
- 1976
  - 30 May: Lohr Stadt–Wertheim, 35 km / Neustadt (Aisch) Bf–Demantsfürth-Ühlfeld, 15 km / Waigolshausen–Wernfeld, 37 km / Mellrichstadt Bf–Fladungen, 23 km / Bad Neustadt (Saale)–Königshofen (Grabfeld), 23 km / Ebermannstadt–Behringersmühle, 16 km (today the Dampfbahn Fränkische Schweiz museum railway) / Kronach–Nordhalben, 25 km / Helmbrechts–Selbitz, 11 km / Pressath–Grafenwöhr Bf, 6 km / Neusorg–Fichtelberg, 15 km / Nabburg–Schönsee, 46 km / Amberg–Schnaittenbach, 22 km
- 1977
  - 1 June: Branch off to Hbf Miltenberg / Lohr Bf–Lohr Stadt, 2 km / Strullendorf–Schlüsselfeld, 32 km

=== 1980s ===
- 1981
  - 31 May: Kitzingen-Etwashausen–Gerolzhofen, 28 km / Mertingen–Wertingen, 17 km / Nördlingen–Wemding, 17 km.
  - 25 September: Deggendorf–Eging, 33.3 km
- 1982
  - 30 April: Passau Hbf–Freyung, 50 km
- 1983
  - 27. Ma: Ettringen–Markt Wald, 7.2 km (24 September 1982 ?)
  - 23 September: Deggendorf–Metten, 4.2 km
- 1984
  - 1 June: Creidlitz–Rossach, 8.0 km / Regensburg-Falkenstein, 35.4 km
  - 2 June: Landsberg (Lech)–Schongau, 28.7 km
  - 28 September: Erlangen-Bruck–Herzogenaurach, 8.9 km / Forchheim–Höchstadt (Aisch), 22.7 km / Miltach–Steinburg, 29.5 km
  - 29 September: Kempten–Sibratshofen–Isny, 37.6 km
- 1985
  - 31 May: Bamberg–Scheßlitz (the so-called Schääzer Bockerla), 13.7 km
  - 1 June: Nördlingen–Dombühl, 54.1 km
  - 27 September: Nördlingen–Gunzenhausen, 39.5 km
  - 28 September: Mühldorf–Wasserburg Bf, 36.0 km (reactivated on 28 May 1994)
- 1986
  - 21 January: (Augsburg–)Neusäß–Welden, 18.8 km
  - 30 May: Wiesau–Waldsassen, 14.3 km
  - 26 September: Holenbrunn–Selb Stadt, 22.8 km / Nuremberg-Stein–Großhabersdorf (the so-called Bibertbahn), 18.5 km
  - 29 November: Bogen Ost–Steinburg, 7.3 km
- 1987
  - 9 January: Türkheim Bf–Ettringen, 8.3 km
  - 3 March: Wasserburg Bf–Wasserburg Stadt, 4.4 km
  - 29 May: Schweinfurt–Gerolzhofen, 19.9 km
  - 25 September: Neumarkt–Beilngries, 27.0 km
  - 26 September: Nuremberg-Dutzendteich–Nuremberg Rbf
- 1988
  - 27 May: Jossa–Wildflecken, 30.7 km / Ebern–Maroldsweisach, 15.5 km / Saal–Kelheim, 4.6 km
  - 8 July: Munich-Moosach/Munich-Johanneskirchen–München-Olympiastadion (previously only on request)
- 1989
  - 26 May: Bad Neustadt–Bischofsheim, 19.0 km
  - 22 September: Wiesau–Tirschenreuth, 11.0 km

=== 1990s ===
- 1991
  - 2 February: Blaibach–Viechtach, 16.25 km
  - 30 April: Viechtach–Gotteszell, 25.0 km (museum railway today)
  - 31 May: Markt Wald–Gessertshausen, 27 km
- 1992
  - 29 May: Neustadt (Waldnaab)–Floß, 15.9 km
  - 31 December: Weidenberg–Warmensteinach, 9.0 km
- 1993
  - 3 September: Kulmbach–Thurnau, 15.9 km
- 1994
  - 27 May: Bogen–Bogen Ost, 2.7 km
- 1995
  - 12 May: Ingolstadt–Zuchering, 5.7 km (track relocated)
  - 26 May: Ingolstadt–Weichering, 9.3 km (trackbed relocated)
  - 28 July: Haßfurt–Hofheim, 15.5 km.

== Route closures in Bavaria since 1950 ==
=== 1950s ===
- 1949
  - 31 December: Wallersdorf–Münchshofen, 7.7 km
- 1959
  - 31 May: Beuerberg–Bichl, 13.5 km, Regensburg-Reinhausen – Regensburg-Walhallastraße, 2.2 km

=== 1960s ===
- 1960
  - 1 February: Feucht–Wendelstein, 5.3 km
- 1966
  - 1 May: Berchtesgaden–Königsee, 4.3 km
- 1968
  - 31 December:Regensburg-Walhallastraße - Wörth a.d.Donau, 20.3 km

=== 1970s ===
- 1971
  - 25 September: Rothenburg–Dombühl, 26 km / Münchberg–Zell, 10.2 km, / Großhabersdorf–Unternbibert-Rügland, 14.3 km
- 1973
  - 3 June: Kalteneck-Tittling, 8.4 km
  - 30 September: Altmannstein-Riedenburg, 10.4 km
- 1975
  - 31 December: Haidmühle-Jandelsbrunn, 18.4 km

=== 1980s ===
- 1984
  - 28 September: Miltach–Steinburg, 29.5 km
- 1985
  - 1 June: Falkenstein-Wenzenbach, 30.2 km
- 1986
  - 27 September: Regensburg-Wenzenbach, 5.2 km

=== 1990s ===
- 1991
  - 2 February: Blaibach–Viechtach, 16.25 km
  - 1 December: Thann-Matzbach–Haag, 6.6 km, originally 18.1; section to Isen closed on 1 February 1974
- 1993
  - 31 December: Falls–Gefrees, 5.3 km (due to the upgrade of the A9 motorway)
- 1994
  - September: Deggendorf–Metten, 4.2 km
  - 1 October: Waldkirchen-Jandelsbrunn, 8.5 km
- 1995
  - 30 April: Eging–Tittling, 12.3 km
  - 1 September: Miltach–Konzell-Streifenau, 15 km
- 1996
  - 1 January: Tutting–Rotthalmünster, 3.6 km / Kellmünz–Babenhausen, 10.3 km / Nördlingen–Wemding, 17.3 km / Bad Endorf–Obing, 18.5 km / Wolnzach-Mainburg, 23.3 km / Ungerhausen–Ottobeuren railway (goods traffic)
- 1998
  - 1 March: Saal (Donau)–Kelheim, 4.6 km
- 1999
  - 15 October: Landshut–Rottenburg (Laaber), 28 km

=== 2000s ===
- 2001
  - 31 July: Creidlitz–Großheirath, 6.4 km
  - 15 December: Dinkelscherben–Thannhausen, 13.9 km
- 2002
  - 1 September: Hengersberg–Eging, 21.7 km
- 2003
  - 1 July: Tutting–Pocking, 8.9 km
- 2005
  - 1 April: Passau–Freyung, 50 km / Forchheim–Hemhofen, 11.8 km

== See also ==
- Royal Bavarian State Railways
- Bavarian branch lines
- List of railway stations in Bavaria

== Sources ==
- Rogl, Hans Wolfgang. Abseits der großen Strecken. Düsseldorf, 1983.
