= List of German railway companies =

This list contains railway companies currently operating in Germany. It includes railway units that are not independent legal entities.

Federal railways and private railway companies with their headquarters abroad are given their authority to operate by the Federal Railway Office (Eisenbahn-Bundesamt). All other private railway companies are authorised by the responsible authorities of the states in which they have their headquarters.

Names of all railway companies have been left in German.

For railway companies that are no longer in existence, see the List of former German railway companies.

The bulk of the railway network in Germany belongs to DB Netz, a subsidiary of Deutsche Bahn AG – this situation is a relic from the time when the Deutsche Bundesbahn and Deutsche Reichsbahn had a monopoly. The stations and halts on the DB Netz network are run by DB Station&Service. Not included in this list are museum railways and transport unions.

A distinction must be made between railway infrastructure companies and railway operating companies; see private railways.

== Deutsche Bahn AG companies ==
- DB Fernverkehr AG, previously DB Reise & Touristik (Long-distance passenger services)
  - DB AutoZug GmbH (international car train services and German night trains under the trade name DB NachtZug)
  - CityNightLine (CNL) (international night services)
- DB Regio AG (Local passenger services)
  - DB Regio Nord (Hanover)
    - DB Regionalbahn Schleswig-Holstein GmbH (Kiel)
  - DB Regio Nordost (Potsdam)
    - DB Regio Regionalbereich Berlin/Brandenburg (Potsdam)
    - DB Regio Regionalbereich Mecklenburg-Vorpommern (Schwerin)
    - Usedomer Bäderbahn GmbH (UBB) (Local passenger services in West Pomerania)
  - DB Regio NRW GmbH (Düsseldorf)
    - Verkehrsbetrieb Rheinland (Köln)
    - Verkehrsbetrieb Rhein-Ruhr (Essen)
    - Verkehrsbetrieb Westfalen (Münster/W)
  - DB Regio Südost (Leipzig)
    - Verkehrsbetrieb Südostsachsen (Dresden)
    - Verkehrsbetrieb Mitteldeutschland (Halle)
    - Verkehrsbetrieb Elbe-Saale (Magdeburg)
    - Elbe-Saale-Bahn (Magdeburg)
    - Burgenlandbahn GmbH (Zeitz)
    - Verkehrsbetrieb Thüringen (Erfurt)
  - DB Regio Hessen (Frankfurt am Main)
    - Regionalverkehr Mittel- und Kurhessen (Gießen)
    - Regionalverkehr Südhessen (Darmstadt)
    - Regionalverkehr Rhein-Main (Frankfurt a.M.)
    - S-Bahn Rhein-Main (Frankfurt a.M.)
  - DB Regio Südwest (Mainz) (for Rhineland-Palatinate and Saarland)
  - DB Regio RheinNeckar (Mannheim) (for Nordbaden)
  - DB Regio Baden-Württemberg (Stuttgart)
    - DB Regio Regionalverkehr Südbaden (Freiburg)
    - DB Regio Regionalverkehr Württemberg (Stuttgart)
    - DB ZugBus Regionalverkehr Alb-Bodensee GmbH (Ulm)
    - S-Bahn Stuttgart
  - DB Regio Bayern
    - S-Bahn München
    - Regio Unterfranken (Würzburg)
    - Regio Mittelfranken (Nürnberg)
    - Regio Oberfranken (Hof)
    - Regio Ostbayern (Regensburg)
    - Regio Bayerisch Schwaben (Augsburg)
    - Regio Allgäu (Kempten)
    - Regio Oberbayern (München)
- DB RegioNetz Verkehrs GmbH
  - Erzgebirgsbahn (Chemnitz)
  - Kurhessenbahn (Kassel)
  - Oberweißbacher Berg- und Schwarzatalbahn (Mellenbach-Glasbach)
  - SüdostBayernBahn (Mühldorf)
  - WestFrankenBahn (Aschaffenburg)
- DB Schenker formerly Railion DB Logistics (Goods traffic)
  - Mitteldeutsche Eisenbahn GmbH (MEG)
  - RBH Logistics (RBH)
- Thalys International (international long-distance services, in cooperations with other European companies)
- DB Stadtverkehr GmbH
  - S-Bahn Berlin GmbH
  - S-Bahn Hamburg GmbH

== Companies of the Veolia Group with railway services ==
- Veolia Verkehr GmbH (Local passenger services)
  - Bayerische Oberlandbahn (BOB)
  - Bayerische Regiobahn (BRB)
  - Veolia Verkehr Sachsen-Anhalt GmbH (Harz-Elbe-Express) (HEX)
  - Märkische Regiobahn (MR) (trade name of the OLA)
  - Mitteldeutsche Regiobahn (MRB) (trade name of Veolia Verkehr Regio Ost)
  - Niederbarnimer Eisenbahn AG (NEB)
  - Nord-Ostsee-Bahn (NOB)
  - NordWestBahn (NWB) (Lower Saxony, Bremen and North Rhine-Westphalia)
  - Ostseelandverkehr GmbH (OLA) Shares: Veolia-Verkehr 70% and Nahverkehr Schwerin GmbH 30%)
  - Ostseebahn GmbH (No operating services)
  - Rheinisch-Bergische Eisenbahn-Gesellschaft mbH
  - Schöneicher-Rüdersdorfer Straßenbahn GmbH (SRS)
  - Veolia Verkehr Regio Ost, formerly Connex Sachsen GmbH and to June 2005 Lausitzbahn GmbH)
  - Verkehrsgesellschaft Görlitz GmbH (VGG) (trams)
  - Württembergische Eisenbahn-Gesellschaft (WEG)

Other subsidiaries of Veolia Verkehr GmbH operate bus services, especially in built-up areas.

- Schienenpersonenfernverkehr von Veolia:
  In Veolia's long-distance trains separate fares apply, independently of Deutsche Bahn. Tickets may be obtained on the trains and elsewhere.
  - InterConnex on the route Leipzig–Berlin–Rostock/Warnemünde
  - Harz-Berlin-Express on the route Berlin - Magdeburg - Halberstadt(Zugteilung) - Quedlinburg - Thale / Wernigerode - Vienenburg (Lower Saxony)
- Veolia Cargo Deutschland GmbH (Goods traffic)
  In the “network” – with 18 locations – are included:
  - Bayerische Cargo Bahn (BCB)
  - Dortmunder Eisenbahn GmbH (DE) (ab 1. Juli 2004)
  - Farge-Vegesacker Eisenbahngesellschaft (FVE)
  - Hörseltalbahn GmbH (HTB)
  - Industriebahn-Gesellschaft Berlin mbH (IGB)
  - Rail4Chem
  - Regiobahn Bitterfeld Berlin (RBB)
  - Teutoburger Wald Eisenbahn (TWE)
- Others operate goods traffic as well:
  - NeCoSS (Neutral Container Shuttle System)
  - Nord-Ostsee-Bahn (NOB)
  - NordWestCargo (NWC)
  - Ostseeland Verkehr (OLA)
  - Württembergische Eisenbahn-Gesellschaft (WEG)

== Companies of the Netinera Group with railway services ==
- Netinera GmbH
  - Osthannoversche Eisenbahnen AG (OHE) (regional goods traffic in Lower Saxony, trans-regional services)
  - PE Arriva AG
    - Ostdeutsche Eisenbahn GmbH (ODEG)
    - Prignitzer Eisenbahn GmbH (PEG)
  - Regentalbahn AG
    - Regental Bahnbetriebs GmbH (RBG) − the Länderbahn − with the following services:
      - Oberpfalzbahn
      - Waldbahn
      - ALEX (former names: ARRIVA-Länderbahn-Express, Allgäu-Express)
    - Vogtlandbahn GmbH (VBG)

Under the trade name Vogtland-Express Netinera offers long-distance passenger services on the route Berlin–Riesa–Chemnitz–Plauen–Hof.

== Other railway companies ==
=== A ===
- Abellio Deutschland GmbH, a part of Abellio
- Ahaus-Alstätter Eisenbahn GmbH (AAE)
- AKN Eisenbahn AG (AKN) (Eisenbahn Altona-Kaltenkirchen-Neumünster) (Local passenger and goods traffic in Holstein)
- Albtal-Verkehrs-Gesellschaft (AVG) (Regional tram operations and goods traffic in the Karlsruhe and Heilbronn area)
- Anhaltische Bahn GmbH (Dessau)
- Ankum-Bersenbrücker Eisenbahn GmbH (only goods traffic)
- Anschlussbahn-Servicegesellschaft Pressnitztalbahn GmbH (Press)
- Arco Transportation GmbH Elsteraue
- Augsburger Localbahn GmbH (AL) (only goods traffic)

=== B ===
- Bahnbetriebsgesellschaft (BBG) Stauden mbH (Fischach) (only a railway infrastructure company)
- Bahnen der Stadt Monheim GmbH (BSM) (only goods traffic)
- Bahngesellschaft Waldhof AG (Mannheim)
- BASF AG, Servicecenter Railway (Ludwigshafen)
- Bayerische Zugspitzbahn
- BayernBahn
- Bayernhafen Gruppe (Hafenbahnen)
  - Hafenbahn Aschaffenburg
  - Hafenbahn Bamberg
  - Hafenbahn Nürnberg und Roth
  - Hafenbahn Regensburg
  - Hafenbahn Passau
- BEHALA Berliner Hafen- und Lagerhausbetriebe (only goods traffic)
- Bentheimer Eisenbahn AG (BE) (only goods traffic)
- Berliner Parkeisenbahn
- Bocholter Eisenbahngesellschaft mbH
- Bodensee-Oberschwaben-Bahn GmbH & Co. KG (BOB)
- Borkumer Kleinbahn und Dampfschiffahrt GmbH (BKD)
- BoxXpress.de GmbH (Hamburg)
- Breisgau-S-Bahn GmbH (BSB; Freiburg im Breisgau)
- Bremen-Thedinghauser Eisenbahn GmbH (BTE) (only goods traffic)
- Bremische Hafeneisenbahn
- Brohltalbahn
- BSB-Saugbagger & Zweiwegetechnik GmbH & Co. KG
- BVO Bahn GmbH (narrow gauge railways in Saxony), from 9 May 2007 Sächsische Dampfeisenbahngesellschaft
- Butzbach-Licher Eisenbahn AG

=== C–D ===
- cantus Verkehrsgesellschaft mbH (Kassel)
- Captrain Deutschland GmbH
- Chemion Logistik GmbH
- CFL Cargo Deutschland GmbH
- Chiemgauer Lokalbahn Betriebsgesellschaft mbH
- Chiemsee-Bahn Feßler & Cie.
- City-Bahn Chemnitz GmbH
- CTL Rail GmbH (Hamburg) (Subsidiary of Chem Trans Logistic, Warsaw)
- D & D Eisenbahngesellschaft mbH (Hagenow)
- Delmenhorst-Harpstedter Eisenbahn GmbH (DHE) (only goods traffic)
- Deutsche Gleisbau Union GmbH
- Deutsche Museums-Eisenbahn GmbH (DME)
- Deutsche Regionaleisenbahn GmbH (DRE)
  - Bayerische Regionaleisenbahn GmbH (BRE)
  - DRE Transport GmbH
- Die-Lei-GmbH
- Döllnitzbahn GmbH (Mügeln)
- Dortmund-Märkische Eisenbahn GmbH (DME) (to 11 December 2004)
- Duisport rail GmbH

=== E ===
- EfW - Verkehrsgesellschaft mbH (EfW, Frechen)
- Eggegebirgsbahn GmbH (Altenbeken)
- Eisenbahnbau- und Betriebsgesellschaft Pressnitztalbahn mbH (Press)
- Eisenbahnen und Verkehrsbetriebe Elbe-Weser GmbH – EVB – (Local passenger and goods traffic)
- Eisenbahn und Häfen GmbH (Duisburg)
- Eisenbahnbetriebe Mittlerer Neckar GmbH (EMN) (Kornwestheim)
- Eisenbahn - Betriebsgesellschaft Neckar - Schwarzwald - Alb mbH (NeSA, Rottweil)
- Eisenbahnbau und Maschinen GmbH (EMA)
- Eisenbahnbewachungs GmbH (EBW, Dachau, Würzburg)
- Eisenbahngesellschaft Ostfriesland-Oldenburg mbH (e.g.o.o.) (Aurich)
- Eisenbahngesellschaft Potsdam mbH (EGP)
- Eisenbahninfrastrukturgesellschaft Aurich – Emden mbH (EAE)
- Eisenbahn-Service-Gesellschaft mbH (ESG, Bietigheim)
- Eisenbahn, Logistik & Transporte Ei.L.T GmbH (Ei.L.T) (Teltow)
- Elektrische Bahnen der Stadt Bonn und des Rhein-Sieg-Kreises (SSB)
- Emsländische Eisenbahn GmbH (only goods traffic)
- Erfurter Bahn GmbH (EB) (passenger and goods traffic)
- Erms-Neckar-Bahn Eisenbahninfrastruktur AG (Bad Urach)
- ERS Railways GmbH (Hamburg, Frankfurt)
- EUREGIO Verkehrsschienennetz GmbH (Stolberg) infrastructure
- Eurobahn (local passenger services of Keolis Deutschland GmbH & Co. KG in Lower Saxony and North Rhine-Westphalia)

=== F–G ===
- Feld- und Kleinbahn Betriebsgesellschaft gGmbH (infrastructure company for Süderbrarup - Kappeln)
- Flensburg-Express (FLEX) (long-distance passenger services in North Germany, insolvent 2003)
- Frankfurt-Königsteiner Eisenbahn
- Frankfurter Hafenbahn
- Freiberger Eisenbahngesellschaft mbH
- Georg Verkehrsorganisation GmbH (GVG) (Internationaler Nachtverkehr)
- Georgsmarienhütten-Eisenbahn und Transport GmbH
- Gleiskraft GmbH
- Groß-Bieberau-Reinheimer Eisenbahn GmbH (only goods traffic)

=== H ===
- Häfen und Güterverkehr Köln AG (HGK) (only goods traffic)
- Härtsfeld Betriebs GmbH
- Hafen- und Bahnbetriebe der Stadt Krefeld (only goods traffic)
- Hamburg-Köln-Express GmbH (HKX)
- Hamburger Hafenbahn
- Hamburger Hochbahn AG (HHA)
- Hafenbahn der Hafen Hamm GmbH (only goods traffic)
- Harzer Schmalspurbahnen GmbH (HSB)
- Havelländische Eisenbahn AG (only goods traffic)
- Heavy Haul Power International GmbH (HHPI)
- Hellertalbahn GmbH (local passenger services in Rhineland-Palatinate/Hesse/North Rhine-Westphalia)
- Hersfelder Eisenbahn GmbH
- Hessische Güterbahn GmbH (only goods traffic)
- Hessische Landesbahn GmbH (passenger and goods traffic in Hesse)
  - HLB Hessenbahn GmbH
  - HLB Basis AG (infrastructure company)
- H. F. Wiebe a construction and infrastructure company operating some infrastructure trains.
- Hochwaldbahn Servicegesellschaft mbH
- Hohenzollerische Landesbahn AG (HzL) (in Baden-Württemberg)
- HSL Logistik GmbH (only goods traffic)
- Hupac Deutschland GmbH

=== I–K ===
- Ilmebahn GmbH (ILM) (only goods traffic)
- Infraleuna GmbH (Leuna)
- Inselbahn Langeoog (shipping services for the island of Langeoog)
- Industrie Transportgesellschaft mbH (ITB, Brandenburg)
- Internationale Gesellschaft for Eisenbahnverkehr (IGE, Hersbruck) with their long-distance train Mitfahrzug
- ITL Eisenbahngesellschaft mbH (Goods traffic, bought by SNCF Geodis in 2010)
- Kahlgrund Verkehrs-GmbH
- Karsdorfer Eisenbahngesellschaft (KEG, insolvent)
- Kassel-Naumburger Eisenbahn AG
- Keolis Deutschland GmbH & Co. KG, Berlin (eurobahn)
- Kölner Verkehrs-Betriebe AG (KVB) Cologne Stadtbahn on railway lines
- Kreisbahn Mansfelder Land GmbH (KML)
- Kreisbahn Siegen-Wittgenstein GmbH

=== L–M ===
- Lappwaldbahn GmbH (Weferlingen)
- LDS GmbH - Logistik Dienstleistungen & Service (Eutin)
- Leipziger Eisenbahnverkehrsgesellschaft mbH (LEG)
- Locomore
- LOCON Logistik & Consulting AG
- Lokomotion Gesellschaft for Schienentraktion mbH
- Lotrac Eisenbahnverkehrsunternehmen GmbH (Eisenach)
- Lüchow-Schmarsauer Eisenbahn GmbH
- Märkische Verkehrsgesellschaft (Lüdenscheid)
- Mecklenburgische Bäderbahn
- Mecklenburgische Bäderbahn Molli GmbH & Co KG (narrow gauge railway)
- metronom Eisenbahngesellschaft mbH (local passenger services in the area of Lower Saxony)
- MEV Eisenbahn- Verkehrsgesellschaft mbH
- mgw Service GmbH & Co KG Kassel
- Mindener Kreisbahnen GmbH (MKB) (only goods traffic)
- Mittelweserbahn GmbH
- Muldental - Eisenbahnverkehrsgesellschaft mbH (MTEG)

=== N ===
- Neukölln-Mittenwalder Eisenbahn-Ges. AG (NME) (only goods traffic)
- Neusser Eisenbahn
- Niederrheinische Verkehrsbetriebe AG (NIAG) (only goods traffic)
- NiedersachsenBahn GmbH
- nordbahn Eisenbahngesellschaft mbH
- Nordbayerische Eisenbahngesellschaft mbH (NbE)
- Norddeutsche Eisenbahngesellschaft mbH (neg)
- Nordic Rail Service GmbH (NRS)
- Nordfriesische Verkehrs-AG (NVAG) insolvent (2003)
- Nordseebahn (Local passenger services Bremerhaven–Cuxhaven railway): trade name, not a company

=== O–P ===
- Oberrheinische Eisenbahn-Gesellschaft (now MVV OEG AG) (electric operations)
- Ortenau-S-Bahn GmbH (Offenburg)
- PBSV GmbH Magdeburg (goods traffic)
- PCT Private Car Train GmbH (Automobillogistik, Tochterunternehmen der ARS Altmann AG)

=== R ===
- Rail Center Nürnberg GmbH & Co. KG
- Rail Technology & Logistics - Magdeburg (RTuL)
- RBH Logistics GmbH (Gladbeck), formerly RAG Bahn und Hafen GmbH
- RbT Regiobahn Thüringen GmbH - Bleicherode, only infrastructure
- Regiobahn GmbH – regional railway company Kaarst-Neuss-Düsseldorf-Erkrath-Mettmann-Wuppertal mbH (Mettmann)
- Regionalbahn Kassel GmbH
- Rent-a-Rail AG (RAR)
- Rennsteigbahn GmbH & Co KG − heritage railway services on the Rennsteigbahn, tourist runs and goods traffic
- Rhein-Haardtbahn GmbH (RHB) (Elektrischer Betrieb)
- Rhein-Neckar-Verkehr GmbH (RNV)
- Rhein-Sieg-Eisenbahngesellschaft mbH (RSE) (Bonn)
- Rhein-Sieg-Verkehrsgesellschaft mbH (RSVG)
- Rhenus Veniro GmbH & Co. KG
- Rinteln-Stadthagener Verkehrs GmbH (RStV) (only goods traffic)
- Rügensche Kleinbahn GmbH & Co
- Röbel-Müritz-Eisenbahn GmbH
- RuhrtalBahn Betriebsgesellschaft mbH
- Rurtalbahn GmbH & Co KG (formerly Dürener Kreisbahn GmbH)

=== S ===
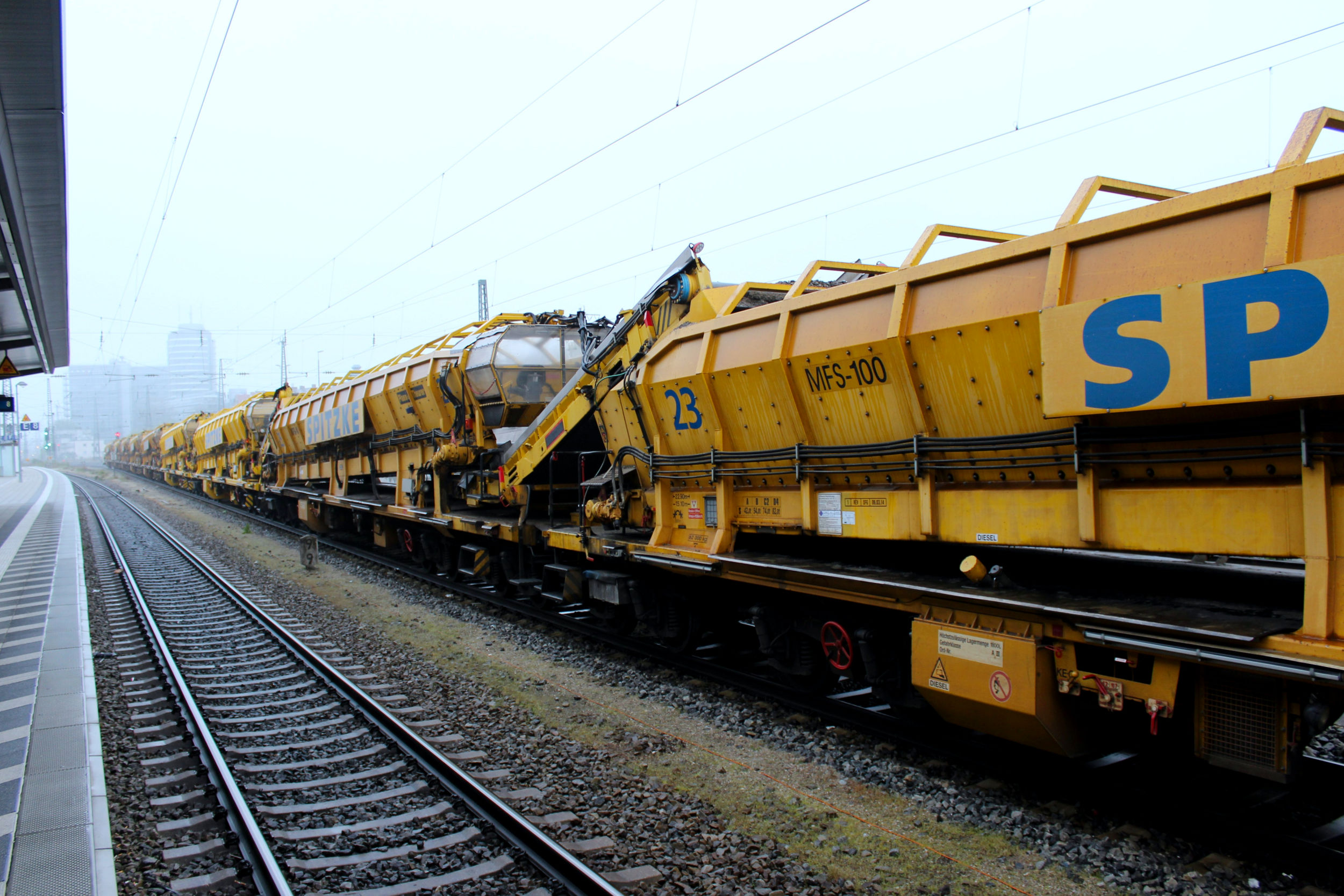
Plasser & Theurer MFS-100 material conveyor and hopper unit for continuous loading and unloading, operated by Spitzke Logistik GmbH.

- Saarbahn GmbH
- Sächsische Dampfeisenbahngesellschaft mbH (SDG)
- Sächsisch-Böhmische Eisenbahngesellschaft (SBE)
- Sächsisch-Oberlausitzer Eisenbahngesellschaft mbH (SOEG)
- SBB GmbH (Konstanz)
- Schleswig-Holstein-Bahn GmbH (SHB)
- Schweizerische Bundesbahnen GmbH (SBB GmbH)
- Seehafen Kiel GmbH & Co KG (SK)
- Städtische Eisenbahn Krefeld (port and industrial railway)
- Städtische Werke Krefeld AG – Krefelder Eisenbahn (SWK Mobil GmbH)
- Spitzke Logistik GmbH
- Stauden-Verkehrs-GmbH (SVG) (a railway infrastructure company, see Bahnbetriebsgesellschaft Stauden GmbH)
- Strausberger Eisenbahn GmbH (STE)
- Süd-Thüringen-Bahn GmbH (STB)
- Südharzeisenbahn GmbH
- Südwestdeutsche Verkehrs AG (SWEG), formerly Südwestdeutsche Eisenbahn-Gesellschaft (local passenger services in Baden)

=== T–U ===
- Tegernsee-Bahn Betriebsgesellschaft mbH
- Thüringer Eisenbahn GmbH
- TransRegio Deutsche Regionalbahn GmbH (local passenger services in Rhineland-Palatinate)
- Trossinger Eisenbahn
- TX Logistic AG
- Unisped (shunting services in southwest Germany, subsidiary of Wincanton)

=== V ===
- vectus Verkehrsgesellschaft mbH
- Verden-Walsroder Eisenbahn GmbH (VWE) (only goods traffic)
- Verkehrsbetriebe Grafschaft Hoya GmbH (VGH) (only goods traffic)
- Verkehrsbetriebe Extertal - Extertalbahn GmbH (VBE) (only goods traffic)
- Verkehrsbetriebe Kreis Plön GmbH
- Verkehrsbetriebe Peine-Salzgitter GmbH
- Verkehrsgesellschaft Dormagen mbH (Industriebahn Zons-Nievenheim)
- VLO Verkehrsgesellschaft Landkreis Osnabrück GmbH (only goods traffic now)
- Verkehrsverband Hochtaunus (VHT) (infrastructure company)
- VIAS GmbH (Odenwaldbahn)
- Vorwohle-Emmerthaler Verkehrsbetriebe GmbH (VEV)
- Vulkan-Eifel-Bahn Betriebsgesellschaft mbH

=== W–Z ===
- Wanne-Herner Eisenbahn und Hafen GmbH (WHE)
- Wedler & Franz Lokomotivdienstleistungen GbR (WFL Potsdam)
- Weserbahn GmbH
- Westerwaldbahn des Kreises Altenkirchen GmbH (WEBA)
- Westfälische Almetalbahn GmbH (WAB Altenbeken)
- Westfälische Verkehrsgesellschaft mbH (WVG) runs the businesses for:
  - Regionalverkehr Münsterland GmbH (Rheine)
  - Regionalverkehr Ruhr-Lippe GmbH (RLG) (only goods traffic)
  - Verkehrsgesellschaft Kreis Unna mbH (VKU)
  - Westfälische Landes-Eisenbahn GmbH (WLE) (goods traffic in the area of Lippstadt in Nordrhein-Westfalen)
- WestfalenBahn (Bielefeld)
- Westmecklenburgische Eisenbahngesellschaft mbH (WEMEG Bantin)
- H.F. Wiebe GmbH & Co. KG
- Wincanton Rail GmbH (WRS) (goods traffic) (St. Ingbert, Saarland)
- Zweckverband ÖPNV im Ammertal (Tübingen)
- Zweckverband Schönbuchbahn (Dettenhausen)
- Zweckverband Verkehrsverband Wieslauftalbahn (Rudersberg)
