= Waldkirchen–Haidmühle railway =

Former railway line in Germany

Waldkirchen–Haidmühle branch line
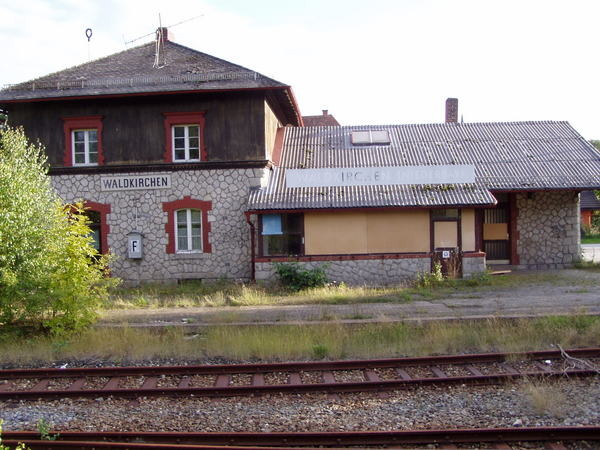
- Waldkirchen station today

Overview
- Line number: 5842

Service
- Route number: ex 417m

History
- Closed: 1994

Technical
- Line length: 25.3 km (15.7 mi)
- Track gauge: 1,435 mm (4 ft 8 1/2 in) standard gauge

The Waldkirchen–Haidmühle railway was a branch line in Bavaria, in southern Germany. It ran from Waldkirchen to Haidmühle in the Bohemian Forest and had a junction there to the line from Haidmühle to Wallern, run by the former United Bohemian Forest Branch Line company (Vereinigte Böhmerwald-Lokalbahnen). It branched at Waldkirchen from the Passau – Freyung branch line (Ilztalbahn). The line was finally closed in 1994.

== History ==
On 10 August 1904 the Bavarian state government authorised the construction of a 26.9 kilometre long branch from Waldkirchen to the Czech border beyond Haidmühle. It was not expected that the line itself would make a profit; it was built to form a junction with the Bohemian railway network. It was opened on 15 November 1910. As a result of the state treaty agreed with Austria on 22 November 1904 this branch line was given a junction with Bohemia at Haidmühle to the United Bohemian Forest Branch Line company to their branch line from Haidmühle to Schwarzes Kreuz (Czech: Černý Kříž) with junctions to Winterberg (Bohemia) (Vimperk), Prachatitz (Prachatice) and Krummau (Český Krumlov). The station building and goods shed at Haidmühle were used jointly by both railway companies and the customs authorities.

The route ran from Waldkirchen initially in an easterly direction to Neureichenau and then northeast towards the border station, gaining 346 m in height. In its early years and after the forced annexation of the Sudetenland through trains ran from Passau to Haidmühle, whilst the Freyung line was given at junction at Waldkirchen.

Plans from the Czech side to extend the route again to Haidmühle, in order to build a better connexion there to Bavarian bus services, were scrapped. However, there are currently plans to reactivate the Ilztalbahn, and reinstate a bus link between Waldkirchen and Nove Udoli.

== Museum railway ==
Between Nové Údolí (German: Neuthal) station and the end of the border bridge in Germany there is a railway museum, housed in three old goods wagons and which recounts the history of the line, as well as museum railway, the Pošumavská jižní dráha (PJD), which is described as the shortest international railway in the world. The line is 105 metres long and links Czech and German national territory. It can only be joined in the Czech Republic and the line is not joined to the Czech (ČD) national railway network. A journey down the line takes 24 seconds.

== Traffic ==
Due to the low axle load permitted on branch lines, special Bavarian Lokalbahn (branch line) locomotives ran on the line. In particular, for goods trains the Bavarian BB II (later DRG Class 98.7) Mallet locomotives from Bw Passau were used. From the early 1930s to the start of the Second World War four-wheeled diesel railbuses of DRG Class 135 and 137, together with their corresponding trailer cars, also ran to Freyung and Haidmühle. In addition the employment of Bavarian Pt 2/3 (later DRG Class 70.0) locomotives was reported.

After the line was refurbished and the track and ballast strengthened, DRG Class 64 locomotives took over the passenger services and DRG Class 81s the goods traffic. Later diesel engines were also used as were Uerdingen railbuses for passenger duties.

== Closure and dismantling ==
On the imposition of the Iron Curtain a section of the line on the Czech side of the border was removed and the importance of the Waldkirchen – Haidmühle line rapidly waned. Only shuttle services continued and all trains ran from Passau to Freyung. On 26 May 1963 passenger services to Haidmühle were withdrawn. Between Haidmühle and Jandelsbrunn goods traffic ceased on 31 December 1975 and between Jandelsbrunn and Waldkirchen on 1 October 1994. After the tracks were lifted the trackbed was used for the Adalbert Stifter cycle path.

== See also ==
- List of closed railway lines in Bavaria
- Bavarian branch lines
- Royal Bavarian State Railways

== Sources ==
- Zeitler, Walther, Eisenbahnen in Niederbayern and in the Oberpfalz, 2. Auflage Amberg, 1997
- Deutsche Reichsbahn, The deutschen Eisenbahnen in ihrer Entwicklung 1835–1935, Berlin 1935
- Kundmann, Hans, Haidmühle, Bahngeschichte unterm Dreisesselberg, in: Eisenbahn-Journal 11/1991, Merker-Verlag, München, 1991
