= Freyung =

Freyung may refer to:

- Freyung, Bavaria, a town in Germany
- Freyung-Grafenau, a district in Bavaria, Germany
- Freyung, Vienna, a public square in Austria

== See also ==
- Passau–Freyung railway, a branch line in Bavaria, Germany
