= Ranna–Auerbach railway =

Branch rail line in southern Germany

Overview
- Line number: 5927

Service
- Route number: 421b

Technical
- Line length: 8.1 km (5.0 mi)
- Track gauge: 1,435 mm (4 ft 8 1/2 in)
- Minimum radius: 250 m (820 ft)
- Maximum incline: 1.25 %

The Ranna–Auerbach railway was an 8-kilometre long branch line or Lokalbahn in Bavaria in southern Germany, which linked Auerbach in der Oberpfalz via Ranna to the Nuremberg–Cheb railway. It replaced the cable railway built in 1882 from the Maxhütte to Sulzbach-Rosenberg, which until then had transported mineral resources in the region around Auerbach to the railway.

== History ==
=== Early planning ===
Intentions to link Auerbach to the railway network appeared as early as 1860, when the Bavarian Eastern Railway (the Ostbahn) drew up plans for a line from Amberg to Bayreuth that, in one option, would have run via Auerbach; but they were not put into effect. In 1867 a fresh attempt was made in which Auerbach was to be linked to the projected Pegnitz Valley railway, but that was also dropped due to the considerable length of the route. Various other plans envisaged inter alia a course from Michelfeld to Auerbach and onwards to Sulzbach-Rosenberg (the Auerbach ‘’Railway Committee’’ on 29 November 1892) or from Kirchenthumbach (terminus of the Pressath–Kirchenthumbach railway) via Auerbach to Michelfeld or Ranna (1896); none of which, however, came to pass.

=== Construction ===
On 9 September 1899 the two interested parties met in Ranna with the companies running the Maximilian (Maximilianshütte) and Queen Marie iron works (Königin-Marienhütte) to negotiate the construction of the railway and laid the financial cornerstone for the route with their pledges of 6,000 and 3,000 marks. Authority for its construction from Luitpold, Prince Regent of Bavaria, followed on 30 June 1900, so that work began straight away and the Lokalbahn was ceremoniously opened on 16 December 1903.

=== Closure ===
The demise of the railway was signalled by the withdrawal of passenger services on 31 January 1970. Whilst even during the Second World War in 1944 an average of four pairs of trains worked the route daily, in the summer timetable of 1967 there was only a single passenger train pair at the unfavourable times of 5:03 am from Auerbach to Neuhaus and 18:40 from Ranna to Auerbach.

After the Maxhütte switched to transporting away its iron ore with its own lorries, the last goods train ran on 21 March 1982. The dismantlement of the trackwork followed in spring 1984; the only remaining visible part of the route today is the now-closed station of Ranna and the supports of the adjoining bridge over the Pegnitz.

== Route description ==
The route branched to the right from the Pegnitz Valley railway after the station at Ranna, crossed the Pegnitz River over a bridge and reached the halt of Rauhenstein at a distance of 2 km. The route then snaked its way through the Herzogswald forest and reached the halt of Hohe Tanne at 2.3 km, which was closed on 28 May 1962. From there the route continued via the halt of Welluck, which had shut as early as 7 October 1922, and passed under Route B 85 before arriving at the terminal station of Auerbach.

From the 8.1 km point, the route climbed a vertical height of 43.82 m and had a maximum incline of 12.5 ‰.

== Running and rolling stock ==
Until 1962 steam locomotives were used on the line; initially the Bavarian classes D VII, D VIII, D XI and Bavarian GtL 4/4. After the war, DRG classes 64 and 98.10 worked the line. From 1962 until its closure diesel locomotive of Class V 100 were used. As passenger coaches, various state railway (Länderbahn) classes were used; goods trains and mineral trains used the corresponding goods wagons.

The laden mineral trains from Auerbach to Maxhütte on the Nuremberg–Schwandorf railway were headed by DRG Class 44s on the section of line from Auerbach to Hersbruck (right of the Pegnitz), running tender first. There the locomotive ran around and hauled the train along the link line to Pommelsbrunn and from there to Sulzbach-Rosenberg to Maxhütte.

== See also ==
- Royal Bavarian State Railways
- Bavarian branch lines
- List of closed railway lines in Bavaria
