= Augsburg–Welden railway =

Railway line in Germany

Overview
- Owner: DB Netz
- Line number: 5301

Service
- Route number: 411a / 913

Technical
- Line length: 25.2 km (15.7 mi)
- Track gauge: 1,435 mm (4 ft 8 1/2 in)

The Augsburg–Welden railway (also referred to in German as the Weldenbahn or "Welden railway") was a branch line in southern Germany that ran from the city of Augsburg to Welden. In its narrowest sense it was a single-tracked branch line, that initially branched off in Augsburg-Oberhausen and, from 1933, from the Augsburg–Ulm main line station at Augsburg-Hirblinger Strasse.

== History ==
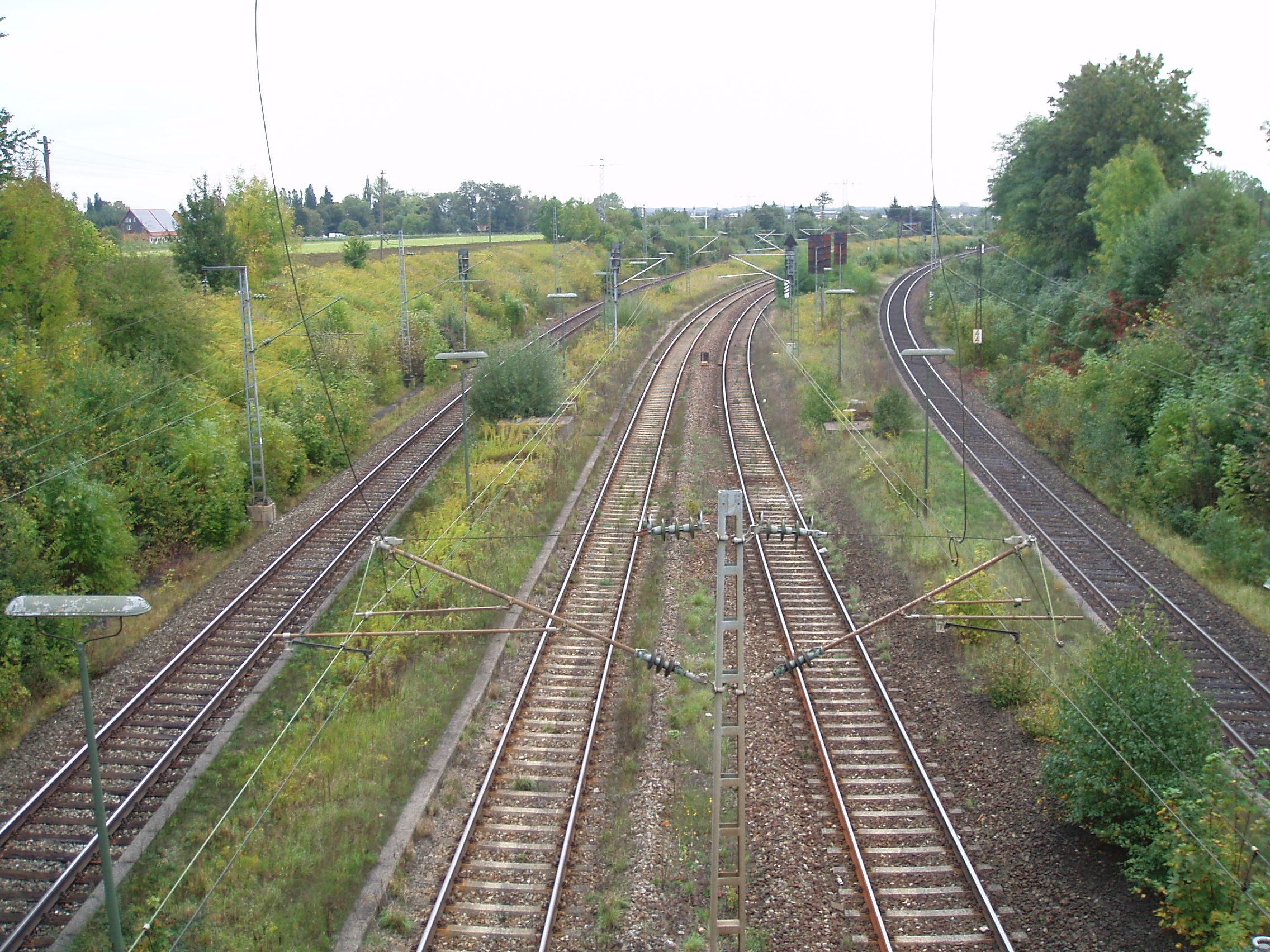
Augsburg-Hirblinger Strasse station

The Royal Bavarian State Railways opened the 23 km long route from Augsburg to Oberhausen on 5 December 1903; all trains began and ended at Augsburg Hauptbahnhof. The volume of traffic on the route entirely fulfilled the expectations of the operator and, in 1909, the line was classed as the second most profitable Lokalbahn in Bavarian Swabia.

Between 1929 and May 1933 the main line from Augsburg to Ulm was relayed west of Augsburg-Oberhausen for a length of 7.5 km as part of the electrification of the railway. In doing so the branch off point for the Weldenbahn was moved to the station at Augsburg-Hirblinger Strasse. From there it ran at that time between the two tracks of the main line as far as Neusäß, where it rejoined the original trackbed.

Since 1949 there has been a bus connexion from Augsburg to Welden in parallel with the railway. In the following decades this, together with the growth of private motor vehicles, resulted in a decline in traffic on the railway line. From the summer timetable of 1975 there were no services at all on Saturday afternoons, Sundays or public holidays. On 21 January 1986 passenger services were withdrawn on the basis of a DB proposal agreed on 17 July 1985 by the management der DB.

Goods traffic, which was always meagre, ceased between Lohwald and Welden in the first half of 1986, and the track was dismantled on this section as early as summer 1986. The dye factory of Keim in Lohwald was supplied until July 1989 by rail, but after the firm moved to Diedorf the remaining section of line was closed and lifted. Only in the area of the old station at Neusäß and between Neusäß and Augsburg-Hirblinger Strasse are remains of the tracks still to be seen.

== Present situation ==
The name and trackbed of the Weldenbahn remain today in the form of a cycle path; and the tarmac route is particularly liked by inline skaters. Public transports services today are provided by the regional bus lines 501 (Augsburg-Neusäß-Aystetten-Welden) and 500 (Augsburg-Neusäß-Aystetten) within the Augsburg Transport Network ( Augsburger Verkehrs-Verein or AVV) zur Verfügung. The lines are operated by Regionalbus Augsburg GmbH (RBA).

== See also ==
- Royal Bavarian State Railways
- Bavarian branch lines
- List of closed railway lines in Bavaria

== Sources ==
Michael Baumgärtner; Jürgen Fiedler (1993), Die Weldenbahn – Geschichte einer bayerischen Lokalbahn (in German), Welden: Holzwinkler Modell-Bahn-Club e. V.
