= Pressig-Rothenkirchen–Tettau railway =

1903–1993 branch line in north Bavaria, Germany

Pressig-Rothenkirchen–Tettau

Overview
- Line number: 5014

Technical
- Line length: 16.9 km (10.5 mi)
- Track gauge: 1,435 mm (4 ft 8 1/2 in)
- Minimum radius: 200 m (656 ft)
- Maximum incline: 2.3 %

The Pressig-Rothenkirchen–Tettau railway was an Upper Franconian branch line that branched off at Pressig from the Franconian Forest Railway and ran to Tettau. The line was closed in 1993.

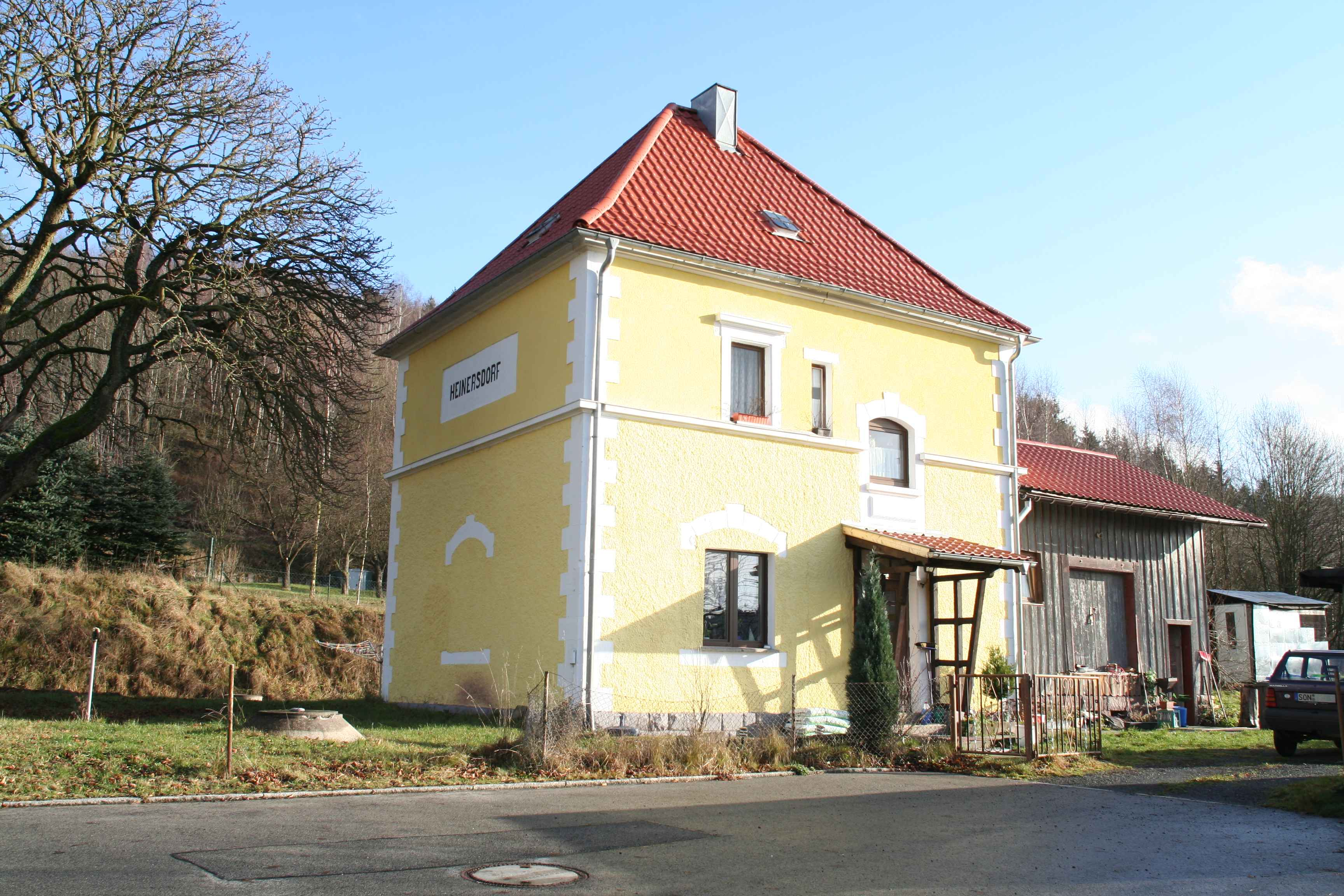
Heinersdorf station

After the completion of the Franconian Forest Railway in 1885 the first request for a spur to Tettau was submitted to the government in Munich in 1890. A railway connexion was of particular interest to the local glass and porcelain industry resident in the so-called "Tettau Corner" (Tettauer Winkel). It was decided that the route for the line should follow a course alongside the River Tettau. That however meant that a state treaty between the Kingdom of Bavaria and the Duchy of Saxe-Meiningen was necessary, because 8.1 km of the line lay within the territory of Saxe-Meiningen and crossed the state border 14 times. On 10 March 1900 the Bavarian Landtag gave its approval for the planning and construction of this Lokalbahn and, on 9 July 1901, the state treaty between the two countries was signed. The largest part of the cost (1.2 million marks for construction and operation of the branch line was borne by Bavaria. Construction began in March 1902 and the line was ceremoniously opened on 23 June 1903.

Three pairs of passenger trains ran daily until 1939; the number was then increased to four. But goods traffic flourished too as the line also proved to be an important link for local industry, both for delivering raw materials (about 15 to 20 wagon loads daily) and dispatching the finished goods (about 10 to 12 wagon loads daily).

In spring 1945 rail traffic was interrupted as a result of one of the bridges over the Tettau being blown up. When Soviet troops occupied Thuringia on 3 July 1945 the old state border became the new Inner German Border and, because the line crossed it several times it remained closed. This had a serious impact on industrial production in the Tettauer Winkel. Not until 16 October 1946 after the Tettau bridge had been repaired could goods traffic resume again. Three goods trains worked the line each week. On 14 April 1947 passenger services started up again with two pairs of trains daily. The passengers in the so-called corridor trains had to keep the doors and windows closed when travelling through the Soviet Zone. In Heinersdorf Soviet soldiers carried out passenger checks.

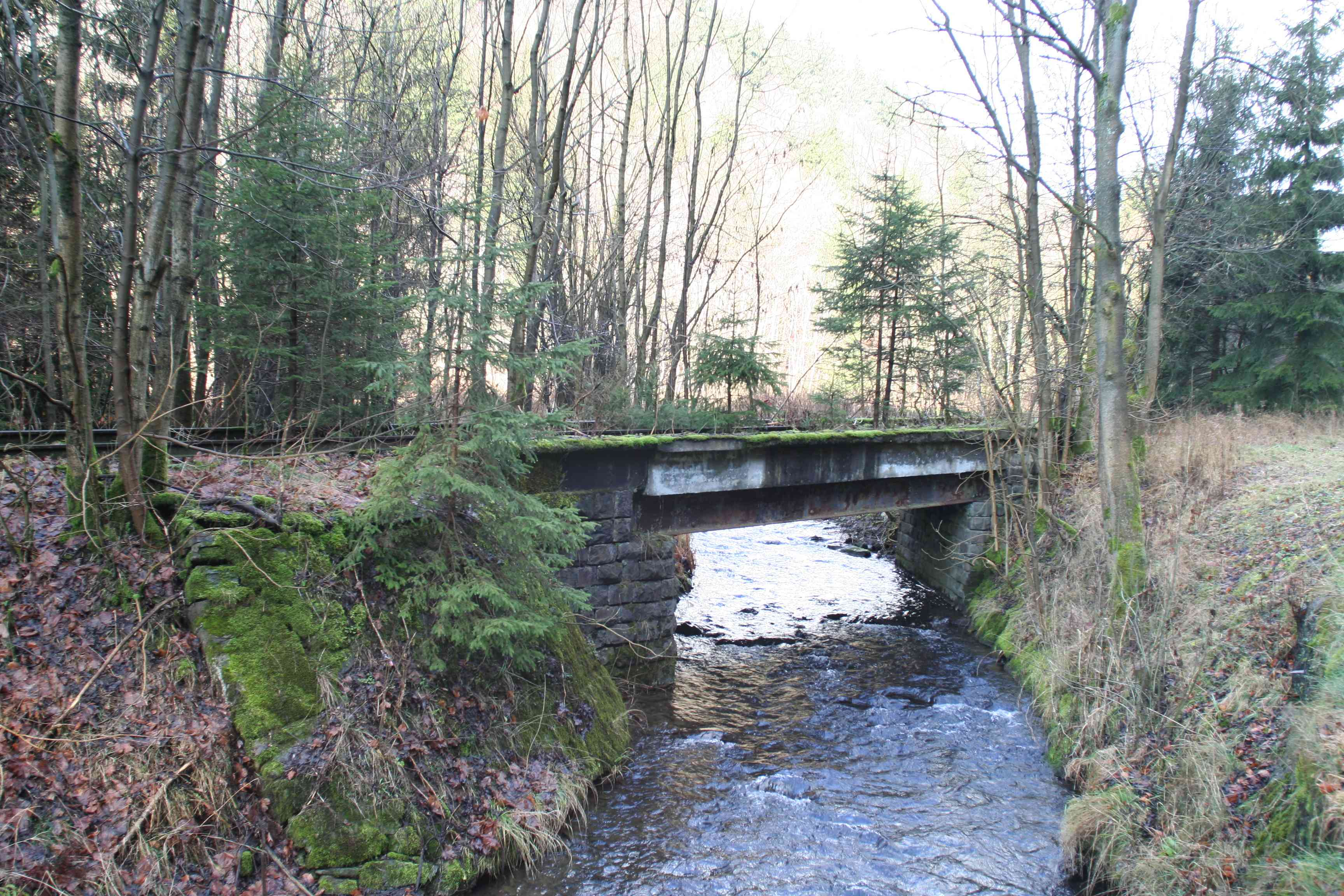
Bridge over the Tettau near Schauberg

In spring 1952 the Deutsche Bundesbahn laid new sleepers and tracks, but on 28 May 1952 train services ended abruptly when the line was shut by the East Germany. By October the tracks on East German soil had been dismantled.

To support industry in the Tettauer Winkel on 1 June 1952 the Deutsche Bundesbahn introduced a Culemeyer heavy trailer service. The goods wagons were transported on heavy trailers over the new road built in 1951 from Steinbach am Wald to Alexanderhütte. There they were transferred to the rails and hauled by a Köf shunter to the sidings at Tettau and Alexanderhütte. Until 1989 about 3,400 trips were carried out annually. The 'island operation' between Tettau and Alexanderhütte was closed in 1983, and the Köf shunted wagons in Alexanderhütte until the end of 1992. In 1987 a private haulier took over the heavy trailer service which finally ended on 31 May 1996.

After the provisional closure of the line, the Pressig-Rothenkirchen–Tettau railway was officially closed on 13 December 1993.

== Sources ==
- Ulrich Rockelmann, Thomas Naumann: The Franconian Forest Railway. The Geschichte of the Steilrampe über the Frankenwald. EK-Verlag Freiburg, 1997. ISBN 3-88255-581-5
- Wolfgang Beyer: Eisenbahn im Sonneberger Land. Eisenbahn-Fachbuch-Verlag Neustadt/Coburg, 2004. ISBN 3-9807748-5-6
