= Amberg–Schmidmühlen railway =

Railway line in Germany

Overview
- Line number: 5063

Technical
- Line length: 21.4 km (13.3 mi)
- Track gauge: 1,435 mm (4 ft 8 1/2 in)

The Amberg–Schmidmühlen railway was a 21 kilometres (13 mi) long Bavarian branch line in southern Germany. It ran through the county of Amberg-Sulzbach from Amberg along the river Vils as far as Schmidmühlen.

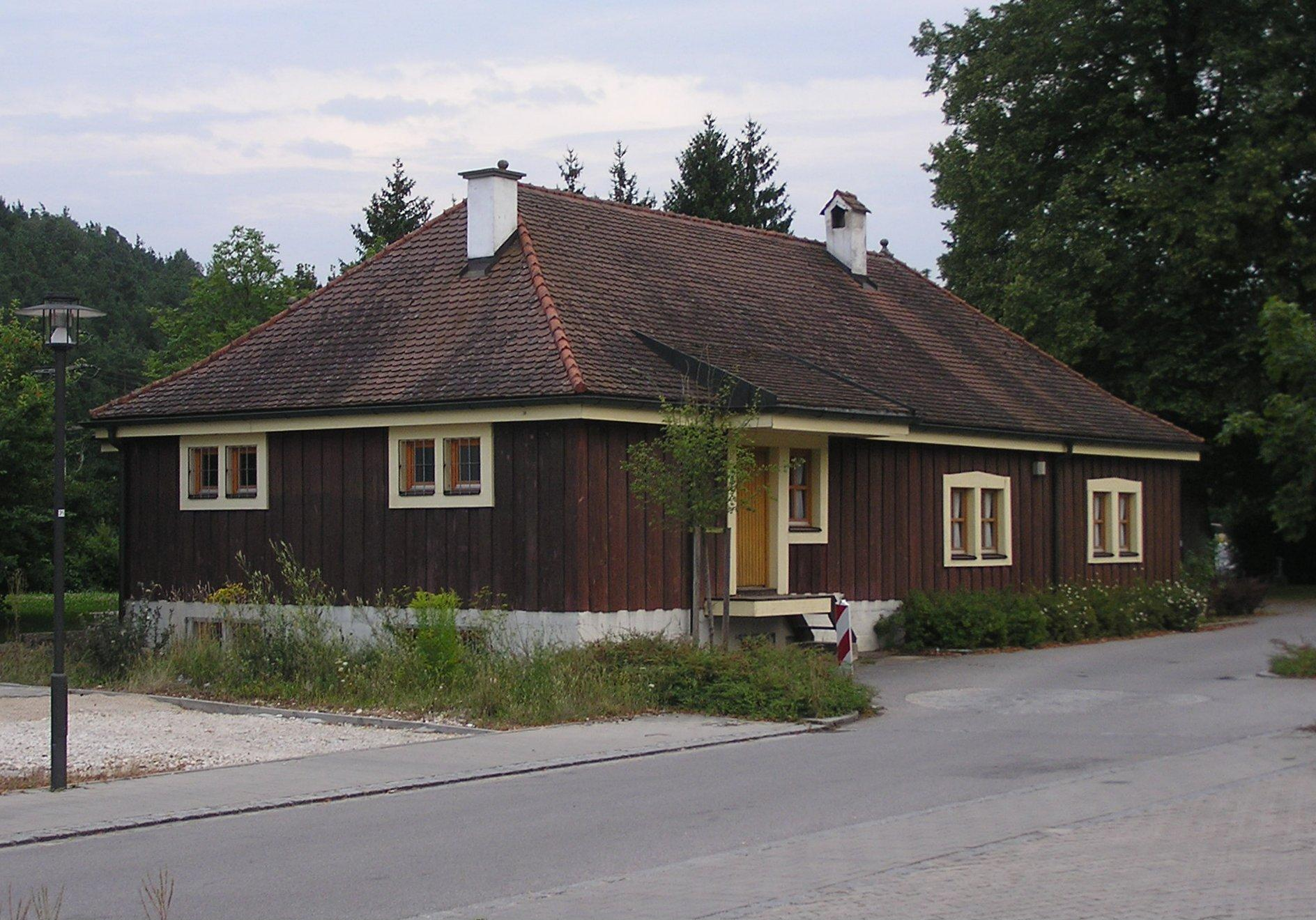
Former station at Schmidmühlen

Although as early as 1904 the legal basis had been established for this Lokalbahn route that was to link Amberg along the Vils valley with Schmidmühlen, there were considerable delays due to numerous arguments over questions of detail as well as over an extension of the line to Hohenburg in the Lauterach valley. The first section to Ensdorf, which branched off the line to Lauterhofen at Drahthammer station, was not opened until 1 May 1910. The second section followed on 18 December 1910, bringing the total length of the line to 21 kilometres (13 mi). Passenger trains, however, started from Amberg, so that the journey was about 2 kilometres (1.2 mi) longer.

As a result of the increased use of railway buses in the 1950s and 1960s, passenger services on the rails were withdrawn on 1 July 1966. Goods traffic continued for considerably longer, albeit only for one customer: the limekiln belonging to the Maxhütte factory at Vilshofen. From time to time heavy goods trains, which needed three DB Class 211 diesel locomotives, ran to the kiln. But on 28 May 1988 that came to an end; the section south of Vilshofen had already closed on 31 May 1985.

In 1990 the route was purchased by the county (Landkreis) and converted to a cycle path between 1991 and 1992.

== Sources ==
- Gerald Hoch, Andreas Kuhfahl: Nebenbahnen in der Oberpfalz. 1. Auflage 2000. Resch-Verlag, Neustadt bei Coburg, 2000, ISBN 3-9805967-7-X.

== See also ==
- Bavarian branch lines
- Royal Bavarian State Railways
- List of railway stations in Bavaria
- List of closed railway lines in Bavaria
