= Deggendorf–Kalteneck railway =

Rail line in Germany

Overview
- Line number: 5841

Service
- Route number: former 876

Technical
- Line length: 54.0 km (33.6 mi)
- Track gauge: 1,435 mm (4 ft 8 1/2 in) standard gauge

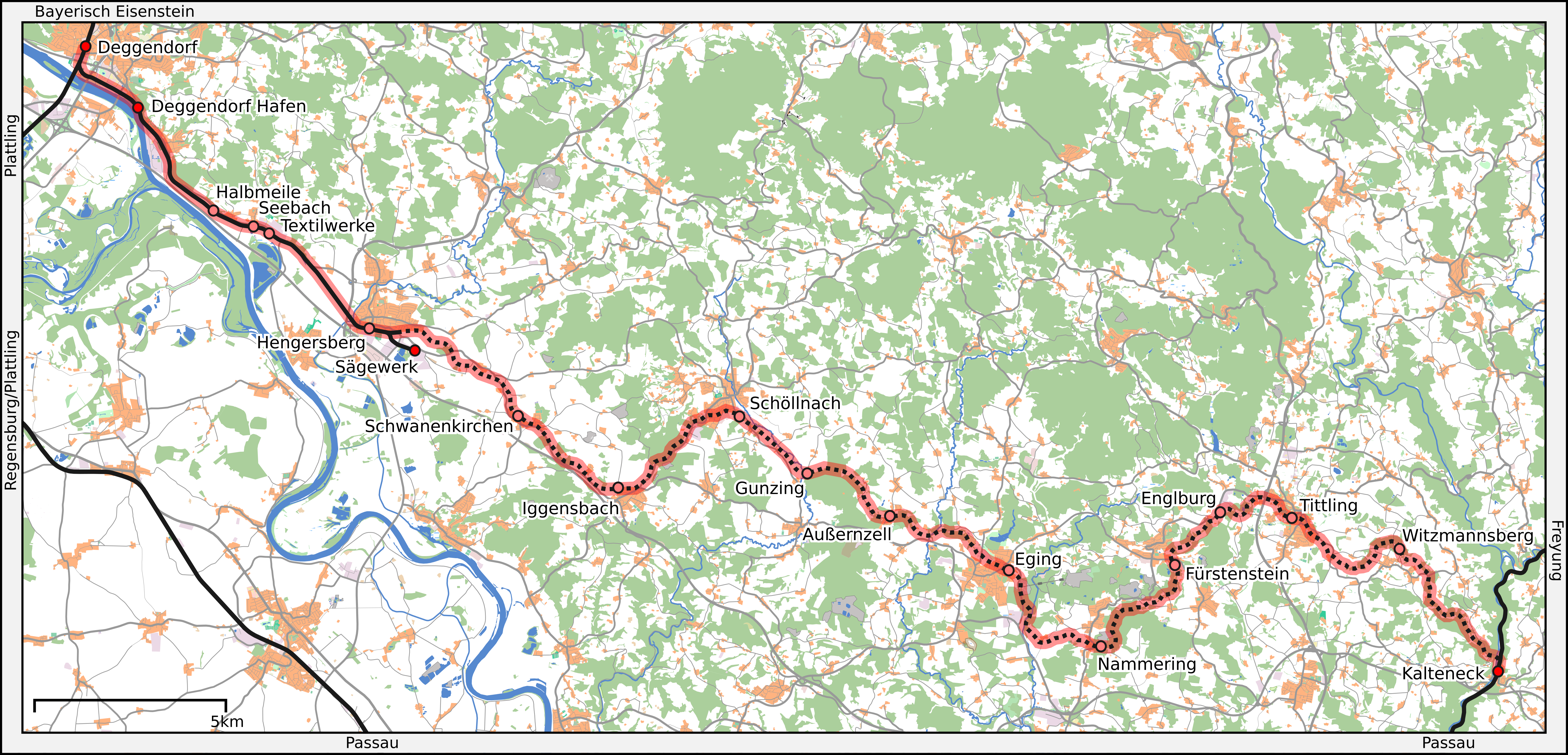
Deggendorf–Kalteneck railway

The Deggendorf–Kalteneck railway linked the railway line running through the Bavarian Forest from Plattling via Zwiesel to Bayerisch Eisenstein with the Ilz Valley railway (Ilztalbahn) from Passau via Waldkirchen to Freyung. In keeping with the naming of the Bavarian Forest railway or Waldbahn from Plattling to Bayerisch Eisenstein, it was called the Vorwaldbahn (lit: pre-Forest railway).

== Construction ==
Following the construction of the Bavarian Forest railway from Plattling via Deggendorf to Bayerisch Eisenstein, completed in 1877, and the Ilz Valley railway from Passau to Freyung, finished in 1892, the local communities situated between these routes, including Aicha, Eging and Tittling, also strove to have a railway. They favoured a stub line from Vilshofen to the north. But there was a realisation that against that, one the one hand, the land rose steeply from the Danube valley and, on the other, it would need a bridge across the Danube. After wrestling with the problem for a long time the Royal Bavarian State Railways decided to build a cross-country route between the two existing railways as the most cost-effective solution.

So the Bavarian state parliament, the Landtag, decided to build a single-tracked cross-country line from Deggendorf via Eging to Kalteneck with a junction to the Ilz Valley railway, passing the requisite law on 26 June 1908. This route could also link up the harbour at Deggendorf and the market at Hengersberg to the railway network. The liability for contentious land acquisition was taken on by Deggendorf, Hengersberg and Passau on behalf of the state railway.

Construction began in summer 1910 at both ends of the line. As a result, the 11.62 km long section from Deggendorf to Hengersberg and the 20.75 km long stretch from Kalteneck to Eging were opened as early as 26 November 1913 with great celebrations. The centre section, 21.66 km long, went into service on 1 August 1914 on the eve of the First World War without much ado.

== Rail traffic ==
For the train services, the Bavarian Lokalbahn engines at the locomotive depots (Bahnbetriebswerke) of Plattling and Passau were made available. On the Deggendorf-Hengersberg line three pairs of trains ran daily for the first few months and, between Eging and Kalteneck, four pairs. The four pairs of through trains initially deployed once the line was fully opened were gradually reduced during the First World War to two pairs. Because these trains also had to take goods wagons with them the journey times on the line were long. In 1936 five pairs of trains worked the route, with trains from both directions ending in Eging in the evening and returning in the morning. In 1976 the five train pairs only ran on weekdays. On Sundays they were replaced by three bus services.

== Closures ==
With the increase in private transport the number of passengers on this line steadily waned, although additional stops were added and operations were switched to railbuses. The freight and part-load goods traffic also suffered heavy losses. As a result, the line was closed little by little. First to go were the passenger services that were withdrawn between Eging and Kalteneck on 1 October 1972. On 3 June 1973 goods traffic from Tittling to Kalteneck ceased too. Of note is that this section was used for occasional diversions to or from Freyung and remained operational for over 20 years. The next closure again affected passenger services, this time from Deggendorf to Eging on 25 September 1981. It was followed by the cessation of goods traffic from Eging to Tittling and, with that, the closure of the entire Eging–Kalteneck section on 2 April 1995. On 2 September 2002 the same fate met the Hengersberg–Eging part of the line. After the removal of the tracks the trackbed was turned into a cycle path, which was fully opened in 2006. On the 11.6 km long remaining section from Deggendorf Hbf via Deggendorf Hafen to Hengersberg only goods traffic now plies. The Deggendorf Hafen (exclusively)–Hengersberg section was transferred on 1 September 2007 as a private industrial line to the ownership of the DHB Grundstücks GmbH + Co. KG. This section is used for goods traffic serving the Schwaiger sawmill.

== Sources ==
- Zeitler, Walther: Eisenbahnen in Niederbayern und der Oberpfalz. 2. Auflage, Amberg 1997, ISBN 3-924350-61-2
- Siegfried Bufe: Nebenbahnen im Passauer Land, Egglham 1998, ISBN 3-922138-66-7

== See also ==
- List of closed railway lines in Bavaria
- Bavarian branch lines
- Bavarian Forest railway
