= Holenbrunn–Leupoldsdorf railway =

Former railway line in Bavaria, Germany

Overview
- Line number: 5031

Technical
- Line length: 10.6 km (6.6 mi)
- Track gauge: 1,435 mm (4 ft 8 1/2 in)

The Holenbrunn–Leupoldsdorf railway was built in two stages. First the Royal Bavarian State Railways decided on 15 August 1877 to link the town of Wunsiedel by a Lokalbahn (~local line) to the main line from Hof to Holenbrunn being opened at the same time, and which was extended in 1878 from Holenbrunn to Marktredwitz. On 8 November 1913 the branch line was also extended from Wunsiedel to Leupoldsdorf. It is suspected that the extension of the route was driven by the owner of the Hammer castle (Hammerschloss) at Leupoldsdorf, a certain "Rosa von Müller". When the line opened, however, she was no longer in residence at the Schloss.

On 28 September 1975 passenger services on the 11 km long route were withdrawn. In autumn 1981 the station building at Leupoldsdorf was demolished and on 23 May 1993 the line was closed.

== See also ==
- Royal Bavarian State Railways
- Bavarian branch lines
- List of closed railway lines in Bavaria
