= Neuses–Weißenbrunn railway =

Former railway line in Germany

Neuses–Weißenbrunn
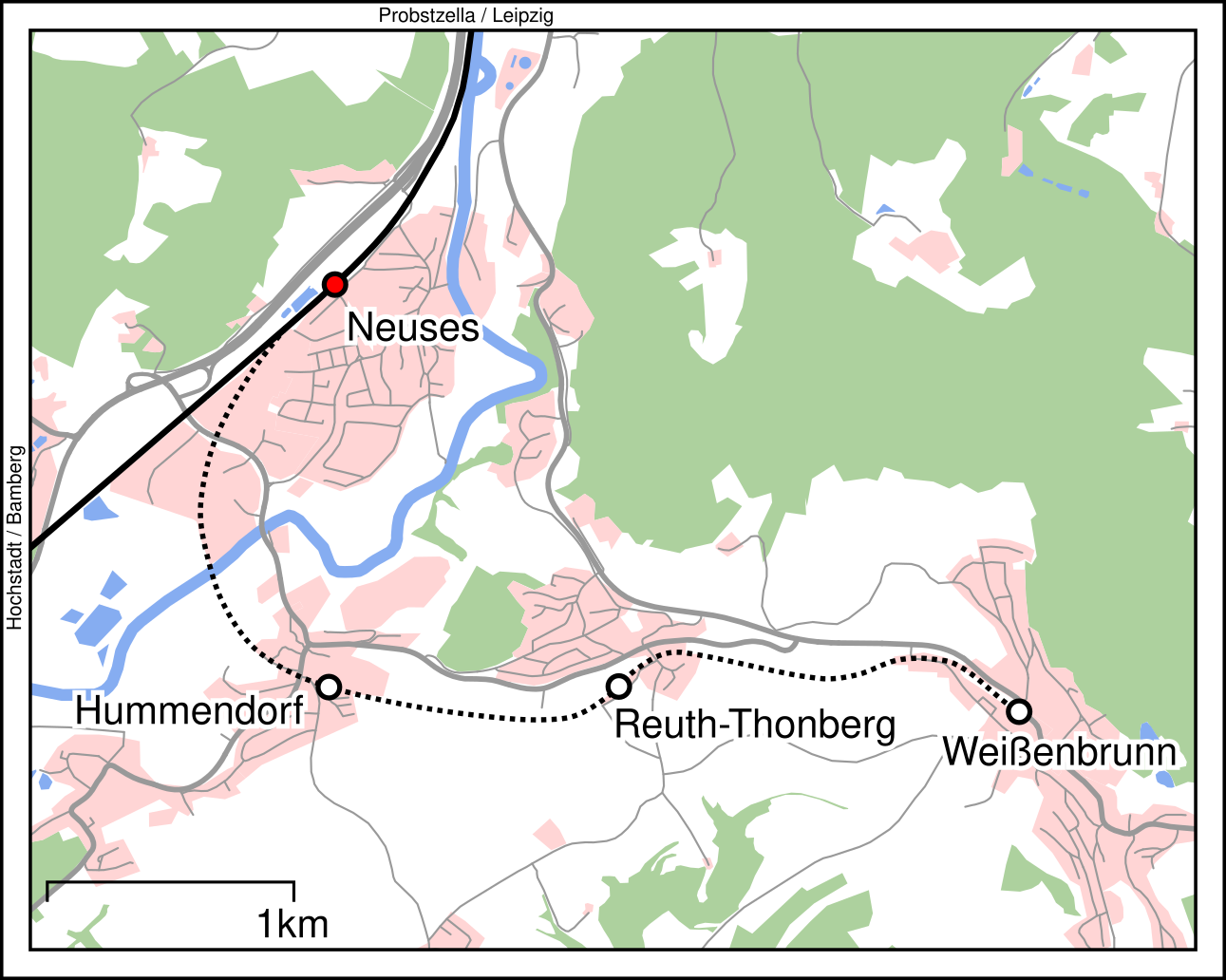

Overview
- Line number: 5011

Service
- Route number: 414s

Technical
- Line length: 5.3 km (3.3 mi)
- Track gauge: 1,435 mm (4 ft 8 1/2 in)
- Minimum radius: 294 m (965 ft)
- Maximum incline: 2.1 %

The Neuses–Weißenbrunn railway was a spur that branched off to Weißenbrunn from the Franconian Forest Railway at Neuses, a village south of Kronach in the province of Upper Franconia in southern Germany. The single-tracked, standard gauge line was not electrified. It was finally closed in 1995.

After the completion of the Franconian Forest Railway in 1885 the first petition to have a branch to Weißenbrunn built was made in 1899 to the government in Munich. But not until 1907 was a goods line agreed. On 26 June 1908 approval under the Lokalbahn law was given to plan and build the Sekundärbahn. Problems in acquiring the necessary land meant that the start of construction was delayed until 1914 and, due to the First World War, the line was not opened until 1 August 1916.

Until 1947 a pair of goods trains worked the line on workdays. From May 1947 until May 1954 there were also passenger services following the opening of a new hospital in Weißenbrunn. This comprised three pairs of trains daily and, from 1950 two pairs on Sundays. The journey time was 12 minutes, to Kronach about 30 minutes.

Goods traffic continued to consist of two pairs of trains daily until the 1960s. In the mid-1980s there were still 3 trains per week. On 24 September 1994 the line was provisionally closed; formal closure followed on 1 March 1995.

== Sources ==
- Ulrich Rockelmann, Thomas Naumann: Die Frankenwaldbahn. Die Geschichte der Steilrampe über den Frankenwald. EK-Verlag Freiburg, 1997. ISBN 3-88255-581-5
