= Wallersdorf–Münchshofen railway =

Former railway line in Germany

The Wallersdorf–Münchshofen railway was a metre gauge railway in the province of Lower Bavaria in southern Germany. It was operated from 1926 to the end of 1949 by the Wallersdorf and Country Narrow-Gauge Railway Cooperative (Kleinbahngenossenschaft Wallersdorf und Umgebung) whose head office was in Büchling. The line started from the station in the market town of Wallersdorf, in Dingolfing-Landau district, and ran to Münchshöfen in the municipality of Oberschneiding, in Straubing-Bogen district. The railway was exclusively used by goods trains.

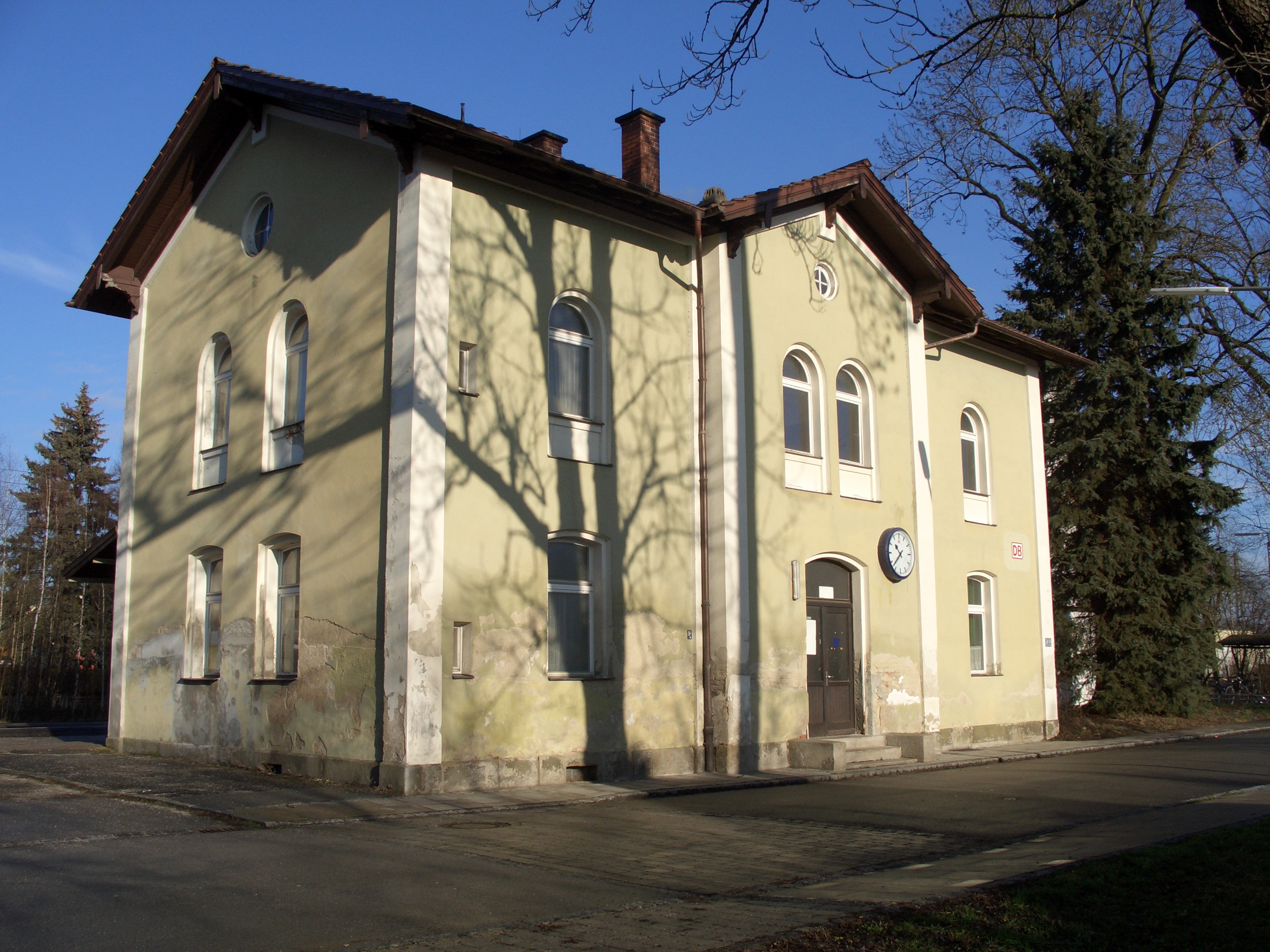
Wallersdorf station from the south

== Construction of the line ==
The Lower Bavarian market town of Wallersdorf lies in the lower Isar valley, 20 kilometres from where the River Isar flows into the Danube near Plattling. Today the town is served by the electrified, single-tracked line from Landshut to Plattling (KBS 931). The station's former marshalling and loading yards − at kilometre post 52.9 – have been dismantled apart from a simple crossing loop for the current regional passenger and goods trains.

The construction of a standard gauge railway from Straubing to Landau an der Isar had been approved in 1869 and from 1872 onwards the Gäuboden communities, led by the town of Straubing, made persistent attempts to have it built, but these efforts remained unsuccessful. As a result, local farmers founded a cooperative to build a narrow-gauge line (Kleinbahn) with a junction on the Landau–Plattling railway. According to Zeitler, the cooperative was given approval to build the line by a Bavarian law passed on 26 June 1908; the authorised route running from the station in Wallersdorf via Büchling to Münchshöfen. On the largely flat valley of Gäuboden the railway was intended to supply the farmers with goods (fertiliser, coal and building materials) and especially during harvest to transport away produce, mainly sugar beet and cabbages, in a cost-effective manner. The German Empire and the Free State of Bavaria each contributed 90,000 Reichsmarks (RM) to the cooperative's capital investment of 187,000 RM. The remainder of the capital was raised from the participating communities and farmers.

Construction did not begin until after the First World War. It was intended to purchase narrow-gauge track and vehicles with a 600 mm (1 ft 11 5/8 in) gauge cheaply from former Army stock. When this failed, the railway embankment, which had been completed in 1923, was widened to take a 1,000 mm (3 ft 3 3/8 in) gauge line and the railway went into service on 6 August 1926. The line had a length of 7.7 kilometres (4.8 mi) and a track length of 8.45 kilometres (5.25 mi)

The line ran northwards from the Reichsbahn loading yard at Wallersdorf station via Vierhöfen (km 2.5) towards Mattenkofen (km 4.2). One kilometre before the village it swung west and reached Büchling (km 5.8) about 500 m north of the village. This was the location for the depot with its coal bunkers, water tanks and a small workshop. Having run on level terrain to this point, the line now ran up a considerable incline of 1:30 for about 250 m in the direction of Münchshöfen. The course of the railway alongside the road to the vicinity of Mattenkofen can still be made out from the trees and bushes on the overgrown trackbed. The line continued on over the field track known as the Rennweg to the goods station of Münchshöfen (km 7.7) on the road to Fierlbach.

Evidently the railway had run-around loops in Wallersdorf and Büchling, and presumably at the terminus in Münchshöfen too. All the loading yards had a section of standard gauge track onto which the standard gauge wagons were off-loaded with the help of oxen or horses. That enable the transporter wagons to be freed up to transport other wagons, whilst the goods wagons were loaded or unloaded.

A proposal in 1928 by the Regensburg Reichsbahn division to the town of Straubing and other communities in the Gäuboden along the line to Landau to connect it to this branch line was not accepted. Even an extension of the line by about 4 km to Oberschneiding could not be put into effect due to a lack of capital.

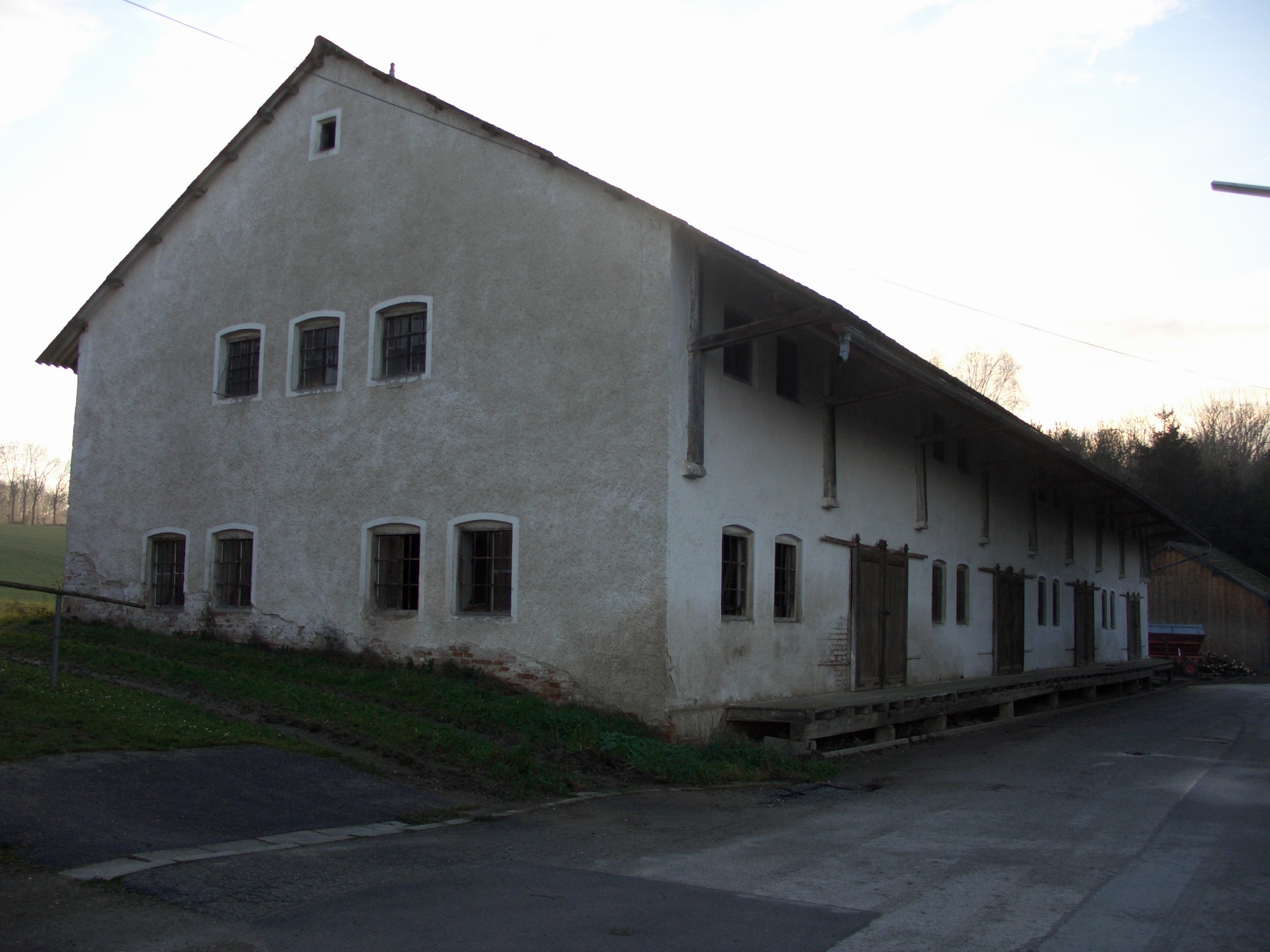
Warehouse on the former siding in Münchshöfen

== Closure ==
The railway company only made a profit in two of its operating years. Only between 7,000 t and 10,000 t of goods were transported annually. The rapid mechanisation of agriculture after the Second World War and the urgent need for further investment to keep the line open led to its closure on 31 December 1949 and subsequent dismantling. The station buildings and loading ramps have since been removed leaving no trace.

== Running and rolling stock ==
In 1926 the railway bought five four-axled transporter wagon from the firm of Orenstein & Koppel. Photographs show that these wagons were hauled in the first two years by a light Lenz class construction engine. This locomotive had been used in building the line. In 1928 the Kleinbahn cooperative bought engine no. 63 (Krauss 1889/2019, type Cn2t) from the Valhalla Railway for 3,727.95 RM. This locomotive, almost 40 years old at that time, had originally been in service in Thuringia and Upper Silesia. In 1932, after a serious accident, they bought locomotive BR 99 133 (Krauss 1922/7986, a Bavarian Pts 3/4, type 1Ch2t) that had been laid up two years earlier on the Neuötting–Altötting railway. This worked on the line until it was closed and was then scrapped.

== Literature ==
- Walther Zeitler (1997), Eisenbahnen in Niederbayern und der Oberpfalz (in German) (2. ed.), Amberg, ISBN 3-924350-61-2
- Dr. Rolf Löttgers, Wolf-Dietger Machel (ed.), "Wallersdorf–Münchshöfen", Neben- und Schmalspurbahnen in Deutschland (in German), München: GeraMond
