= Passau–Freyung railway =

Railway line in Germany

Passau–Freyung branch line
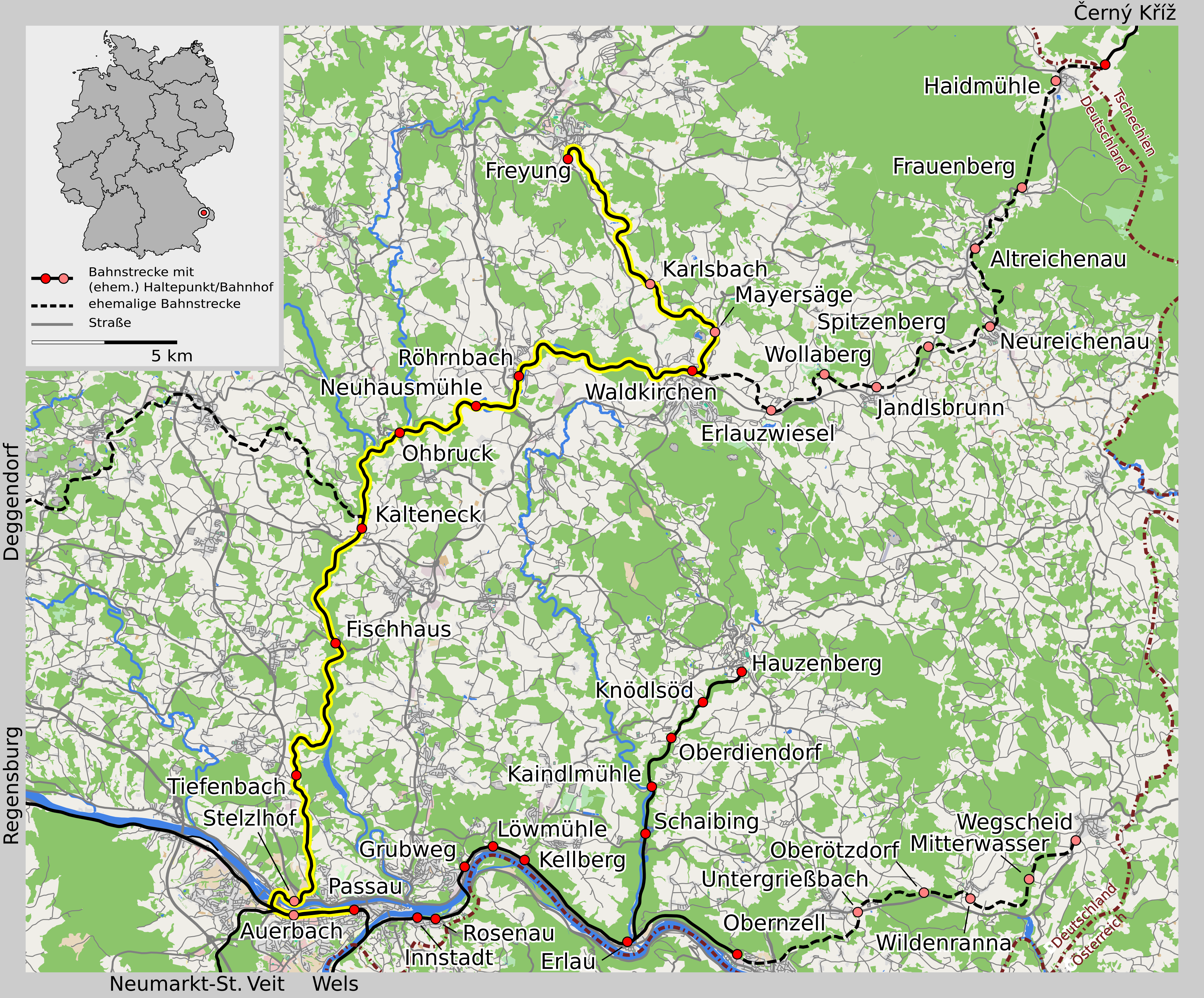

Overview
- Line number: 5840

Service
- Route number: 12888 (ex 877)

Technical
- Line length: 49.5 km (30.8 mi)
- Track gauge: 1,435 mm (4 ft 8 1/2 in) standard gauge
- Minimum radius: 180 m
- Operating speed: max. 50 km/h
- Maximum incline: 2.5%

The Passau–Freyung railway, also known as the Ilz Valley Railway or Ilztalbahn, is a branch line in Bavaria, Germany. It runs from Passau to the town of Freyung in the Bavarian Forest. At Kalteneck it forms a junction with the branch line to Eging-Deggendorf. At Waldkirchen the Waldkirchen–Haidmühle line branches off towards the Czech border, where since 1945 there has been a junction with the Czech railway network.

== Course ==
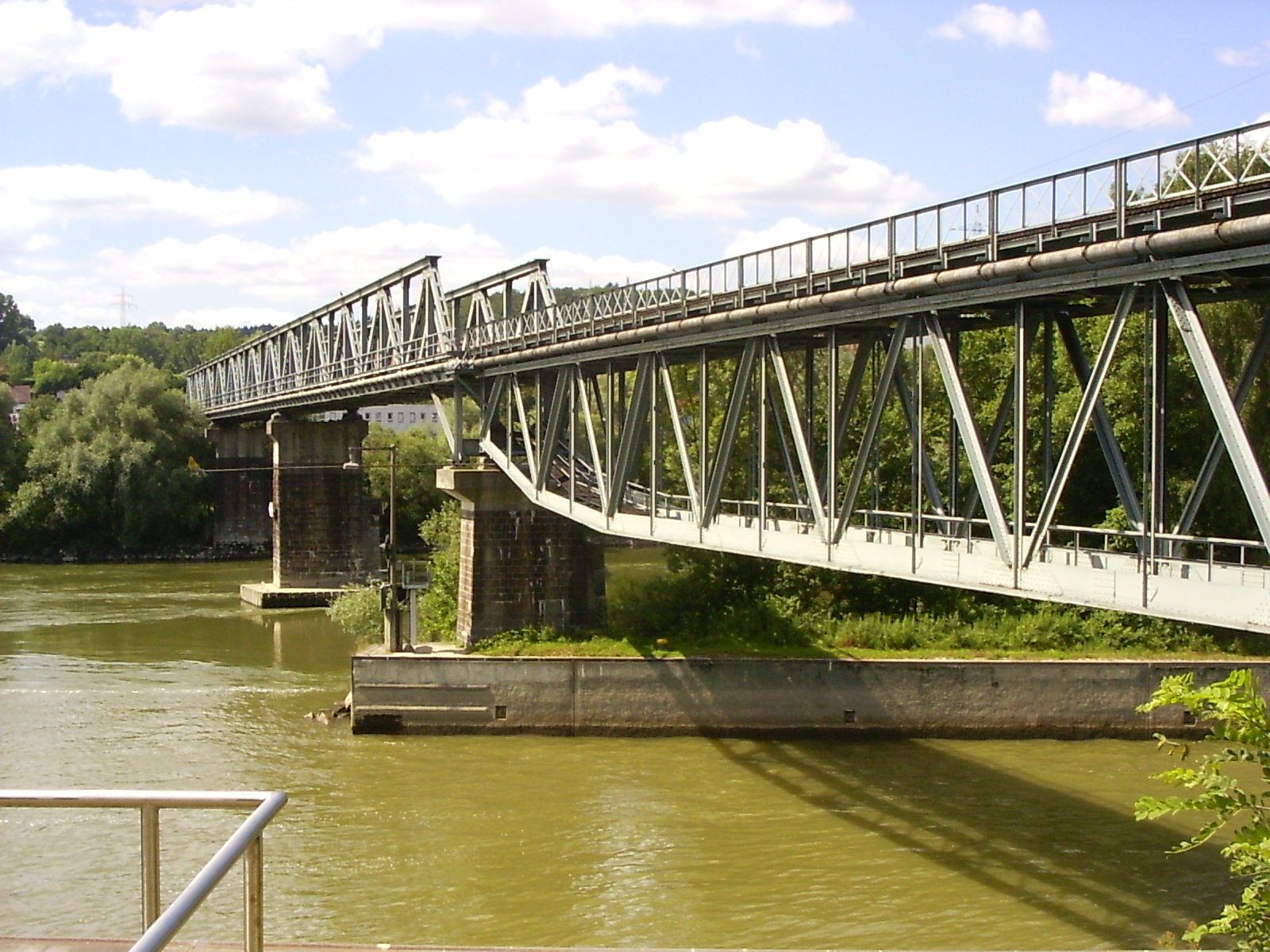
Die Kachlet bridge

The Ilztalbahn begins at platform 1a, the so-called Waidlergleis, in Passau Hauptbahnhof. From there it runs to the west over the present-day timetable route (Kursbuchstrecke or KBS) 880, branches off about 2 kilometres to the north and crosses the river Danube on the Kachlet bridge not far from Kachlet power station. Thereafter it climbs into the Bavarian Forest and reaches the valley of the river Ilz behind Tiefenbach. It then follows the Ilz northwards. In the two Fürsteneck Tunnels the line leaves the Ilz valley and heads east into the Osterbach valley as far as Waldkirchen. From here it turns north again towards Freyung. In Waldkirchen the 26.9 km long route to Haidmühle via Jandelsbrunn branches off.

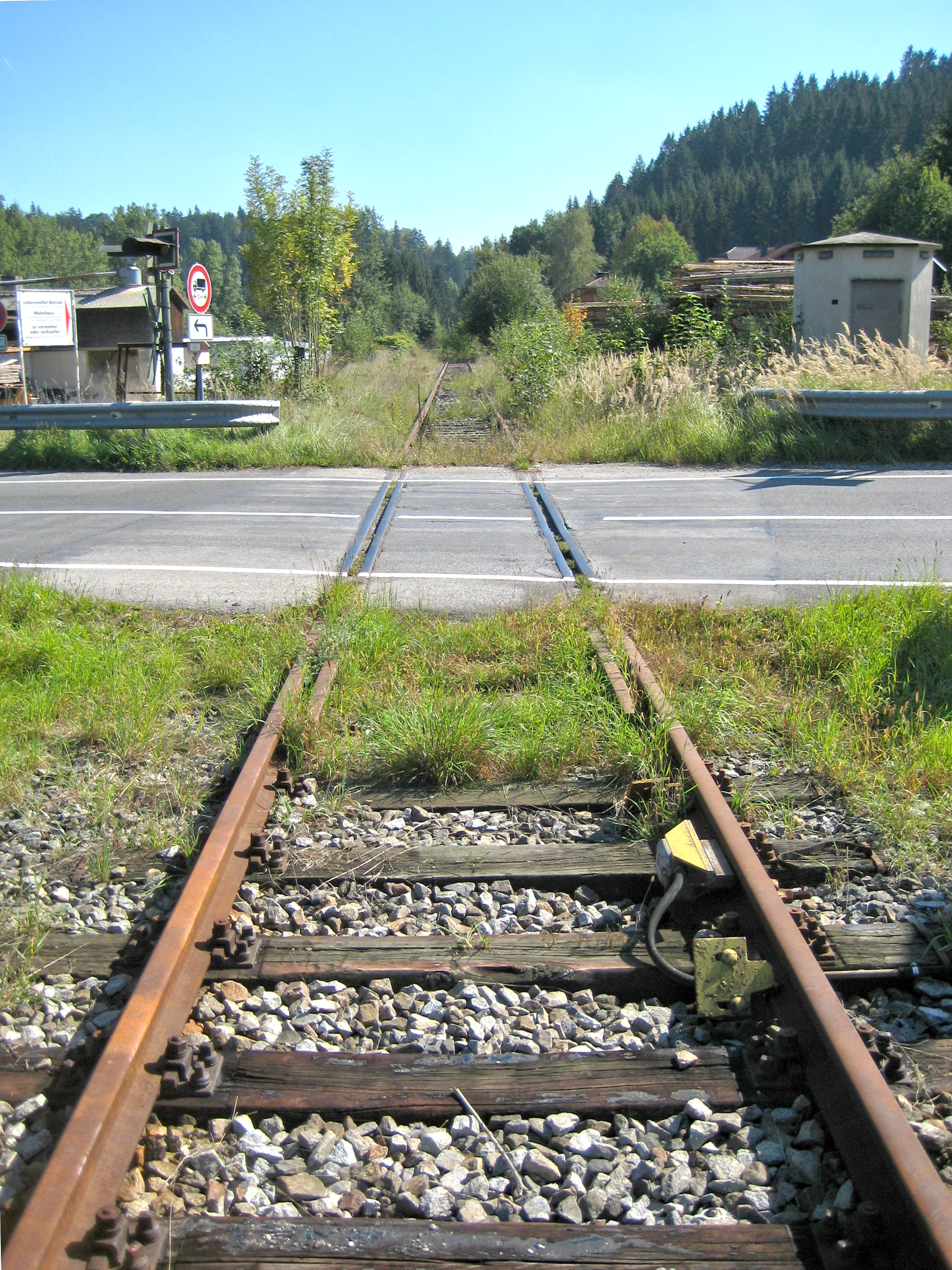
Fischhaus

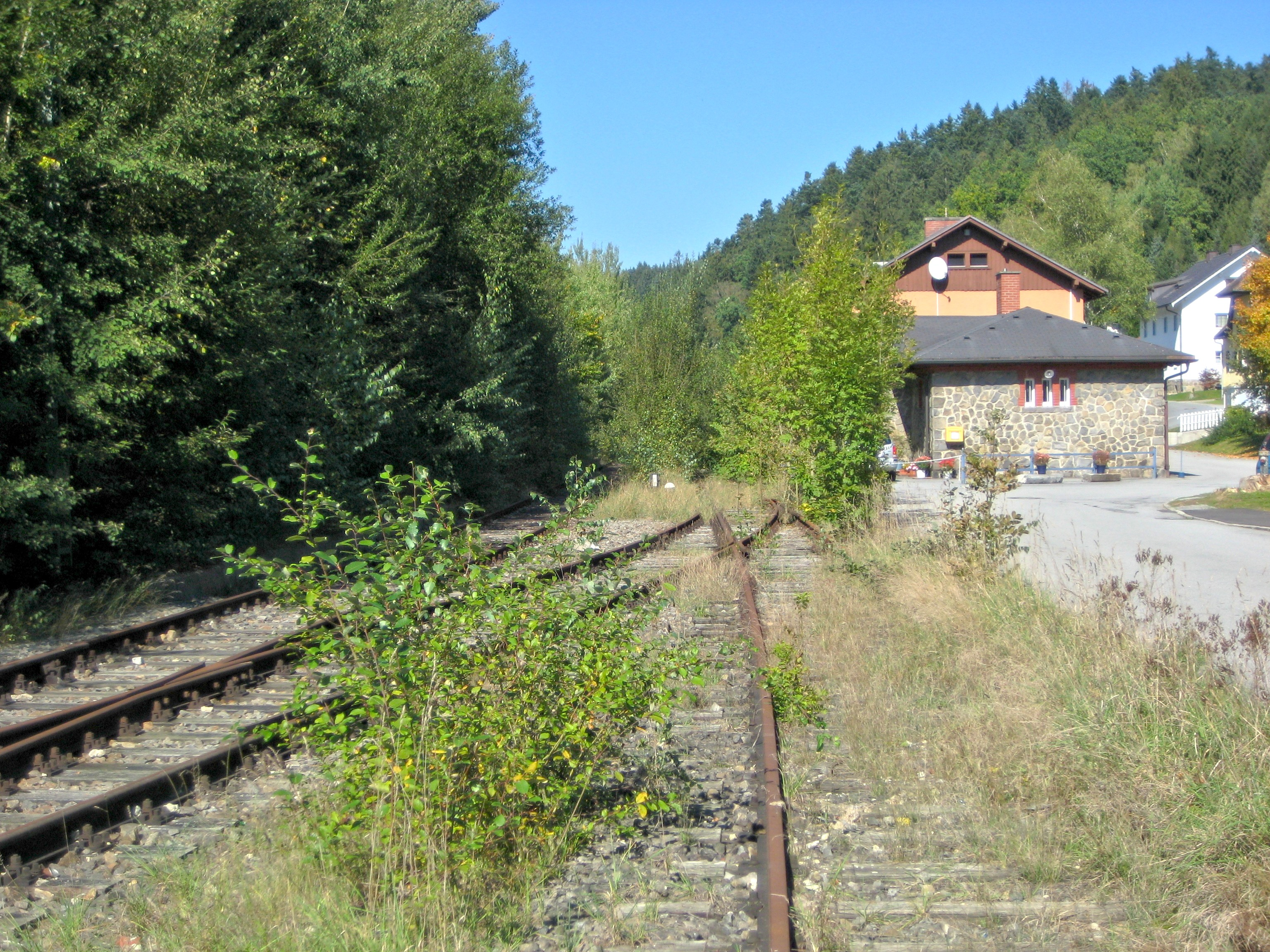
Kalteneck, old station

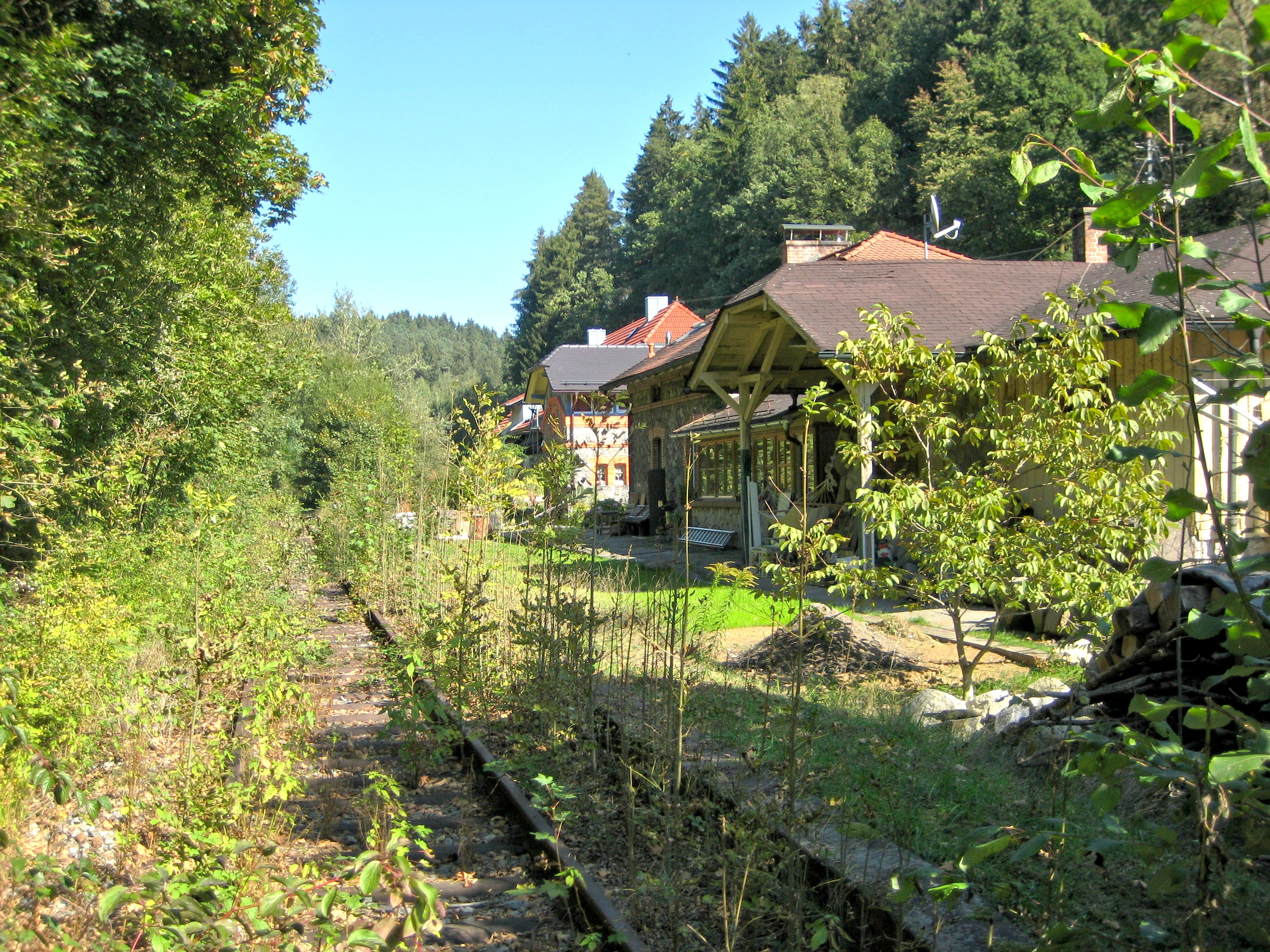
Fürsteneck, old station

== Construction ==
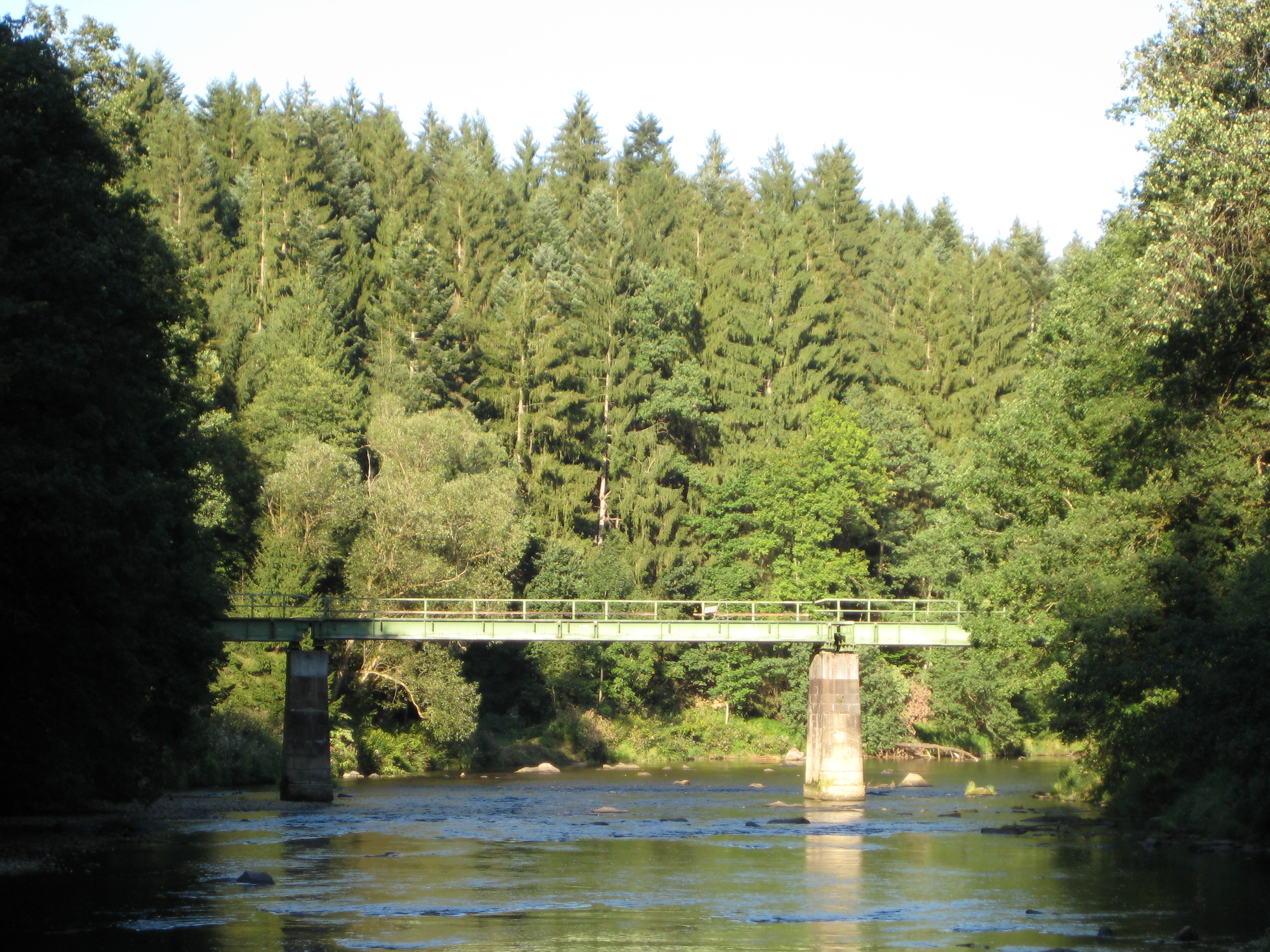
Ilz bridge north of Fischhaus

The construction on the Ilztalbahn to Freyung began in 1887, following the granting of the licence on 13 January 1886 and was taken into service on 15 October 1892. The section to Röhrnbach was opened earlier, on 6 December 1890. Construction costs were almost 6 million marks. In addition to passenger services the route was mainly intended for the transportation of granite and logs. As a result, in the early years to about 1906, passenger trains were often classed as mixed trains, the so-called "goods trains with passenger services" (Güterzüge mit Personenbeförderung) or GmP, which resulted in journey times of up to 3 hours due to shunting movements at the stations en route.

Plans to link this railway with the Zwiesel–Grafenau line and hence to effect a connexion from Passau as far as Cham, were stymied when the latter was routed close to the town in accordance with the wishes of Grafenau townsfolk. Subsequent plans to build a railway from Grafenau via Schönberg to Fürstenstein from the Deggendorf–Kalteneck railway, which turned off the Ilztalbahn at Kalteneck, also came to nothing. And hopes expressed during the construction of the narrow gauge railway, the Spiegelau Forest Railway (Spiegelauer Waldbahn) in 1908 from Klingenbrunn via Spiegelau to Mauth, to build a standard gauge line between Mauth and Freyung, did not come to fruition either.

== Services ==
Due to the low axle load permitted on branch lines, Bavarian Lokalbahn locomotives were employed on the route. For goods traffic, Bavarian BB II tank engines from Passau locomotive depot (Bahnbetriebswerk) were usually used. These Mallet locomotives later became the DRG Class 98.7 and were used on the routes to both Freyung and Haidmühle. From the beginning of the 1930s to the start of the Second World War, four-wheeled diesel railbuses of Classes 135 and 137 were also used, together with their respective trailer cars. In addition, there are reports of Class 70 (ex Bavarian Pt 2/3) tank engines being employed.

After the line was refurbished and the track and ballast upgraded, Class 64 locomotives took over the running of passenger services and Class 81s handled the goods traffic. Later, diesel engines were also used for the latter and Uerdingen railbuses for the former.

== 1945 to 1979 ==
The Second World War left its mark on the Ilztalbahn. The Kachlet bridge was blown up on 30 April 1945, the tunnel at Tiefenbach caved in. But from 3 February 1947 the tunnel was usable and from 29 April 1948, after repairs to the bridge, the entire route was open again.

From the 1960s, passenger services were mainly delivered by railbuses. On the introduction of the holiday express trains in 1979, even the former Trans-Europ-Express trains came from Dortmund to Freyung during the summer.

== Closure and decline ==
With the establishment of the Iron Curtain a section of track on the Czech side of the border was removed on the Waldkirchen – Haidmühle line. As a result, the importance of this section of route fell quickly, so that only shuttle services were left and all trains just ran from Passau to Freyung. On 26 May 1963 passenger services ceased on the line to Haidmühle. Goods traffic was withdrawn between Haidmühle and Jandelsbrunn on 31 December 1975 and between Jandelsbrunn and Waldkirchen on 1 October 1994. After the track was lifted, the trackbed became the Adalbert Stifter cycle path.

From 1980 onwards, traffic on the Ilztalbahn gradually reduced. Sunday services were closed and weekday traffic reduced to four pairs of trains. On 30 April 1982 passenger services were finally withdrawn completely. The reason for the closure of the line was stated as the decrepit state of the Kachlet bridge over the Danube. This bridge was refurbished by November 1982 for 3.6 million DM (1.8 million euros) as was the section of the line as far as Kalteneck for a further 1 million DM (510,000 euros), because the ZF Passau rack railway firm in Patriching near Passau and the Bundeswehr in Freyung continued to generate a lot of goods traffic. For this period of time, goods services were diverted via Deggendorf-Eging-Kalteneck.

In the final period up to 2002 only goods trains worked the line, mostly tank transporters for the Bundeswehr (to April 2001) and goods train for the caravan firm of Knaus from Jandelsbrunn and the above-mentioned rack railway company. The termination of the transport contract by the Bundeswehr at Freyung spelt the end of goods services on the line. The only passenger services were occasional specials by the Passauer Eisenbahnfreunde, the last one on 5 August 2001.

== Reactivation moves ==
In April 2005 the line was officially closed by the Federal Railway Office (Eisenbahnbundesamt or EBA). Two opposing groups then emerged. One wanted to have a cycle path built on the trackbed, the other pressed for the reactivation of railway services. Both groups have developed detailed plans, but by 2008 it was still unclear which would succeed. Details of the negotiations so far are given at de: Bahnstrecke Passau–Freyung.

== See also ==
- List of closed railway lines in Bavaria
- Bavarian branch lines
- Royal Bavarian State Railways

== Sources ==
- Zeitler, Walther, Eisenbahnen in Niederbayern und in der Oberpfalz, 2. Auflage Amberg, 1997
- Deutsche Reichsbahn, Die deutschen Eisenbahnen in ihrer Entwicklung 1835-1935, Berlin 1935
- Kundmann, Hans, Haidmühle, Bahngeschichte unterm Dreisesselberg, in: Eisenbahn-Journal 11/1991, Merker-Verlag, München, 1991
