= Neuenmarkt-Wirsberg–Bischofsgrün railway =

Former railway line in Germany

Overview
- Line number: 5006

Service
- Route number: 818

Technical
- Line length: 18.3 km (11.4 mi)
- Track gauge: 1,435 mm (4 ft 8 1/2 in)

The Neuenmarkt-Wirsberg–Bischofsgrün railway was one of the seven railways that used to serve the Fichtel Mountains area.

== Route ==
It began at Neuenmarkt-Wirsberg station (50°05′35.11″N 11°34′54.13″E) and initially followed the line to Bayreuth. In Schlömen the line branched off to the southeast which is why the village had its own branch and signal box (50°04′32.47″N 11°34′41.00″E). After that the line roughly followed the course of the White Main. From Bad Berneck to Bischofsgrün it ran parallel to the river. Bischofsgrün station (50°03′14.05″N 11°46′28.53″E) lay over a kilometre outside and a good 50 metres above the village.

== History ==
The line was built in three stages. In 1896 the railway reaches the spa town and former district capital of Bad Berneck, in 1897 Goldmühl and finally in 1898 the terminus at Bischofsgrün. There a locomotive shed was provided for the stabling and maintenance of steam locomotives.

Passenger traffic on the entire line was suspended on 26 May 1974 and goods traffic ended between Goldmühl and Bischofsgrün on 31 May 1986. On 31 December 1993 goods traffic east from Lanzendorf was also withdrawn due to a landslide in the Fichtel Mountains. The section from Schlömen to Lanzendorf was finally closed on 30 June 2006.

== The line today ==
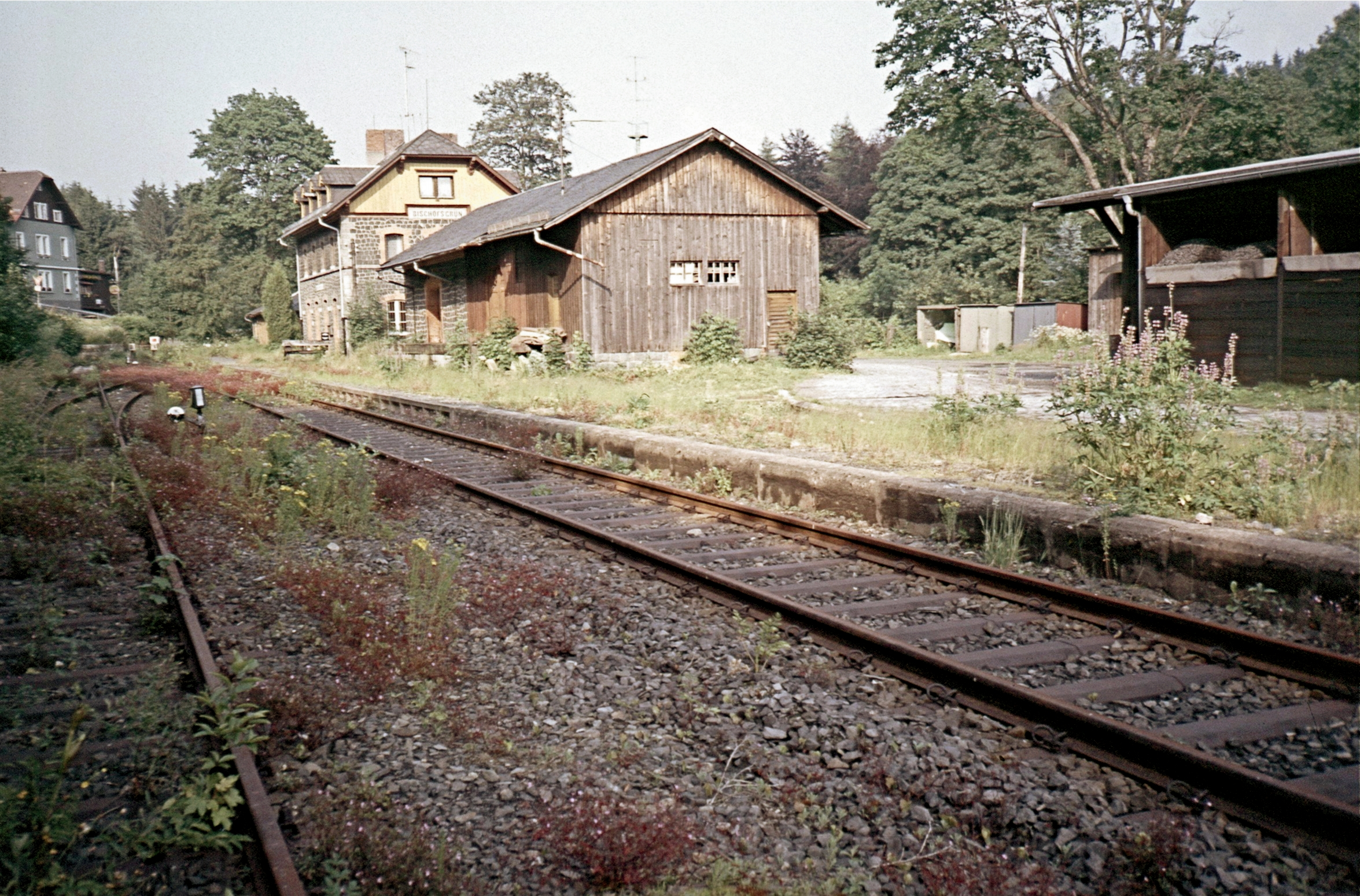
Bischofsgrün Station

Today the line has been dismantled, and trackbed disrupted by the extended A 9 motorway. In Bad Berneck the station (50°02′36.15″N 11°39′52.99″E) has been demolished and, on the old station yard the new B 303 road runs. East of Bad Berneck the trackbed is being used as a cycle path. The station building at the terminus in Bischofsgrün is still standing.
