= Naila–Schwarzenbach am Wald railway =

Branch rail line in Bavaria, Germany

Overview
- Line number: 5023

Service
- Route number: 838

Technical
- Line length: 9.9 km (6.2 mi)
- Track gauge: 1,435 mm (4 ft 8 1/2 in)

The Naila–Schwarzenbach am Wald railway was a small branch line in the state of Bavaria in southern Germany. It ran for 9.88 kilometres from Naila alongside the Culmitz stream to Schwarzenbach am Wald. The single-tracked, standard-gauge railway line was built by the Royal Bavarian State Railways and opened on 1 July 1910.

== History ==
On 30 September 1973, passenger services were withdrawn and, in 1994, it was finally closed and dismantled. The timetable route number (Kursbuchnummer) for this line was 420g up to 1970 and 838 from 1970 to 1992.

Since Spring 2010 there is a cycle path along much of the old line.

== Gallery ==
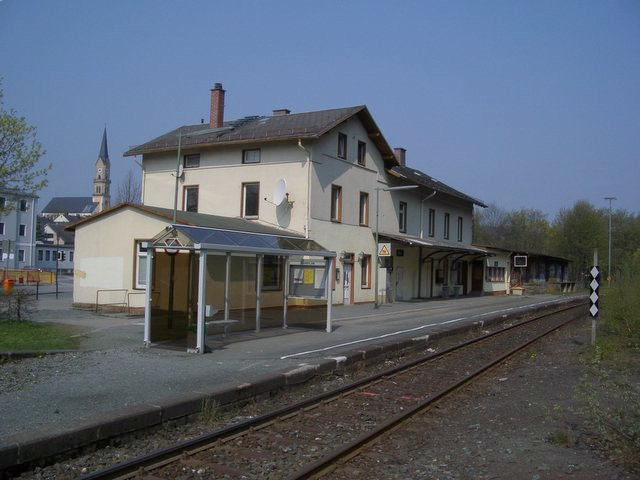
Naila station

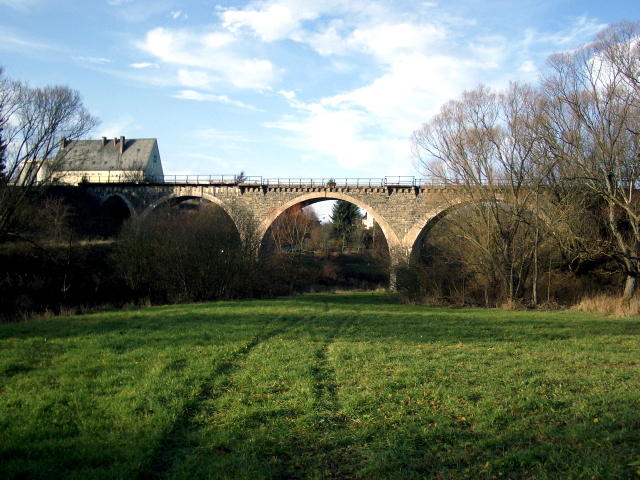
The Selbitz bridge at Naila

== See also ==
- Royal Bavarian State Railways
- List of railway stations in Bavaria

== Sources ==
- Andreas Kuhfahl, Wolfram Alteneder: Die Nebenbahnen der BD Nürnberg. Verlag C. Kersting, Bonn 1986, ISBN 3-925250-02-6
- Siegfried Bufe: Eisenbahn in Oberfranken. Bufe-Fachbuch-Verlag, München 1982, ISBN 3-922138-13-6
- Robert Zintl: Bayerische Nebenbahnen. Motorbuch Verlag, Stuttgart 1977, ISBN 3-87943-531-6
- Deutsche Reichsbahn, Horst-Werner Dumjahn: Die deutschen Eisenbahnen in ihrer Entwicklung 1835-1935. Reichsdruckerei, Berlin 1935, Nachdruck mit Vorwort von Horst-Werner Dumjahn: Dumjahn Verlag, Mainz 1984, ISBN 3-921426-29-4
