= Weißenbrunn =

- Municipality
- Coat of arms

- Location of Weißenbrunn within Kronach district
- Interactive map of Weißenbrunn
- Location within Germany Location within Bavaria
- Coordinates: 50°12′00″N 11°20′47″E
- Country: Germany
- State: Bavaria
- Admin. region: Oberfranken
- District: Kronach

Government
  - Mayor (2020–26): Jörg Neubauer (SPD)

Area
  - Total: 26.40 km^{2} (10.19 sq mi)
- Elevation: 330 m (1,080 ft)

Population (2025-12-31)
  - Total: 2,704
  - Density: 102.4/km^{2} (265.3/sq mi)
- Time zone: UTC+01:00 (CET)
  - Summer (DST): UTC+02:00 (CEST)
- Postal codes: 96369
- Dialling codes: 09261, 09264, 09223
- Vehicle registration: KC
- Website: www.weissenbrunn.de

Weißenbrunn is a municipality in the district of Kronach in Bavaria in Germany.
