= Tettau =

- Municipality
- Coat of arms

- Location of Tettau within Kronach district
- Interactive map of Tettau
- Location within Germany Location within Bavaria
- Coordinates: 50°28′12″N 11°15′30″E
- Country: Germany
- State: Bavaria
- Admin. region: Oberfranken
- District: Kronach
- Subdivisions: 6 Ortsteile

Government
  - Mayor (2020–26): Peter Ebertsch (CSU)

Area
  - Total: 23.8 km^{2} (9.2 sq mi)
- Elevation: 638 m (2,093 ft)

Population (2025-12-31)
  - Total: 1,862
  - Density: 78.2/km^{2} (203/sq mi)
- Time zone: UTC+01:00 (CET)
  - Summer (DST): UTC+02:00 (CEST)
- Postal codes: 96355
- Dialling codes: 09269
- Vehicle registration: KC
- Website: www.tettau.de

Tettau (German pronunciation: [ˈtɛtaʊ]) is a municipality in the district of Kronach in Bavaria in Germany.
