= Gessertshausen–Türkheim railway =

Railway line in Germany

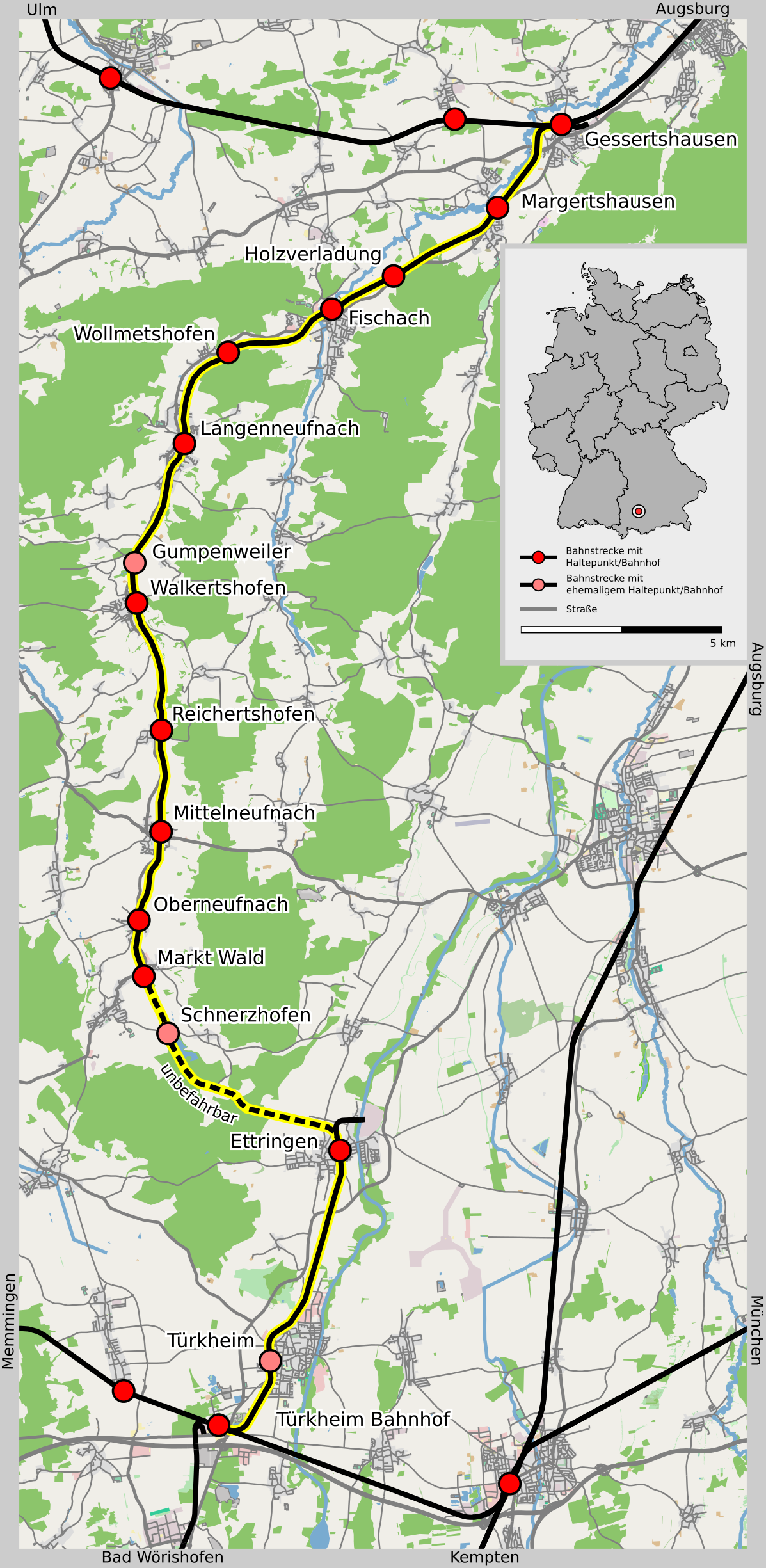

Overview
- Native name: Staudenbahn
- Line number: 5340
- Locale: Bavaria
- Termini: Gessertshausen; Türkheim

Service
- Route number: 984

History
- Opened: 8 February 1912

Technical
- Line length: 42.4 km (26.3 mi)
- Number of tracks: Single track
- Track gauge: 1,435 mm (4 ft 8 1/2 in) standard gauge
- Minimum radius: 300 m (980 ft)
- Operating speed: 60 km/h (37 mph)
- Maximum incline: 1.06%

The Gessertshausen–Türkheim railway (also known as the Staudenbahn—Stauden Railway) is a railway line through the Stauden (hence the name), the southern part of the Augsburg-Westerwald Nature Park (in the districts of Augsburg and Unterallgäu, Bavaria, Germany). The line was built from 1908 to 1912 and had a length of 42.4 kilometres (26.3 mi). One section (Ettringen – Markt Wald) was closed in 1983 because of low passenger numbers and the poor state of the track. The line from Türkheim to Ettringen is used by the Lang Papier factory. The section from Markt Wald to Gessertshausen is only used by an excursion train association. Every second Sunday a diesel fuel train runs from Augsburg Hbf to Markt Wald.

== Future ==
Plans for the reactivation of the Staudenbahn differ between the northern and southern sections.

The northern section (Gessertshausen – Langenneufnach) remains under active development as part of the proposed Augsburg suburban railway network. A new stop at Langenneufnach Süd is planned, and documents for the plan‑approval procedure were submitted in early 2025. Passenger service on this part of the line could begin around 2028 to 2029.

The southern section (Langenneufnach – Türkheim) was formally rejected in October 2025 following the results of an official potential study. The Bavarian Ministry of Housing, Construction and Transport and the Unterallgäu district committee concluded that the forecast demand—around 800 passenger‑kilometres per track‑kilometre—was well below the minimum requirement of 1,000 for state funding. Consequently, all planning and reactivation efforts for the southern section have been permanently cancelled, and no future reconsideration is expected.

=== Impact of the 2026 track-access charge ruling ===
On 19 March 2026, the European Court of Justice ruled (Case C-770/24) that Germany's cap on regional-rail track-access charges (Trassenpreisbremse) was incompatible with EU law. The Federal Network Agency (Bundesnetzagentur) was required to recalculate charges for 2025 and 2026, with regional services facing higher costs, a redistribution of roughly 400 million euros for 2026, prompting warnings of service cancellations unless federal regionalisation funds rose to match.

With the southern section's reactivation already permanently cancelled in October 2025, the ruling affected mainly the still-active northern section. The district of Augsburg and the Bavarian government nonetheless reaffirmed that they are trying for the northern reactivation. Transport Minister Christian Bernreiter stated that the ruling would not change the state's support, while stressing that the federal government must provide reliable funding to absorb the additional costs, which is a big challenge. Rising regional charges intensify the funding pressure on a project whose cost-benefit ratio of 1.1 leaves close to no margin for the project to succeed.
