= Passauer Eisenbahnfreunde =

German railway society

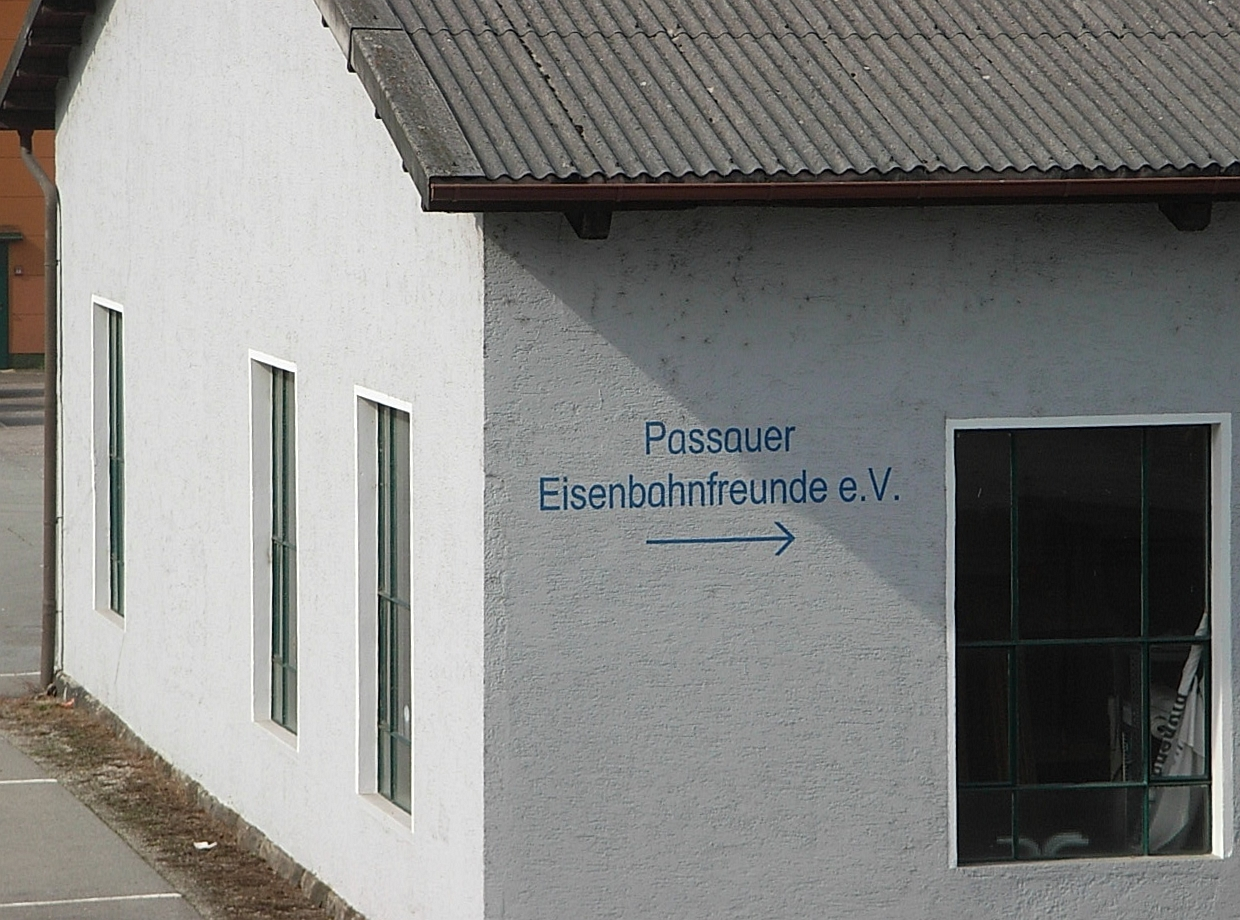
On the terrain of the Passauer Eisenbahnfreunde

The Passauer Eisenbahnfreunde (Passau Railway Society) or PEF is a German railway society with the aim of preserving historic railway vehicles in working order in order to operate them.

The society was founded in 1978 in Passau. In 2007 it had about 190 members and is registered as a limited company (e. V.).

== Vehicles ==
All vehicles belonging to the society are maintained and repaired by volunteer mechanics in their free time. The inspections and certifications are carried out by independent experts in order to guarantee operating safety.

== Traction units ==
=== Railbuses ===
The society owns two Class 798 railbuses, an associated VB 98 centre car and a VS 98 driving car. Apart from one power car, all parts of the multiple unit have passed their general inspection and may therefore operate on networks owned by Deutsche Bahn, ČD, ÖBB and other companies. The general inspection of the second power car was due in 2007. For more information: see the Uerdingen railbus article.

=== V 40 diesel locomotive ===
In order to be able to carry out shunting, a Class V 40 diesel locomotive was procured. This engine is equipped with remote control and automatic couplers, in order to be able to shunt with the minimum of staff. The V40 has a top speed of 45 km/h and a power output of 400 PS.

=== Köf III ===
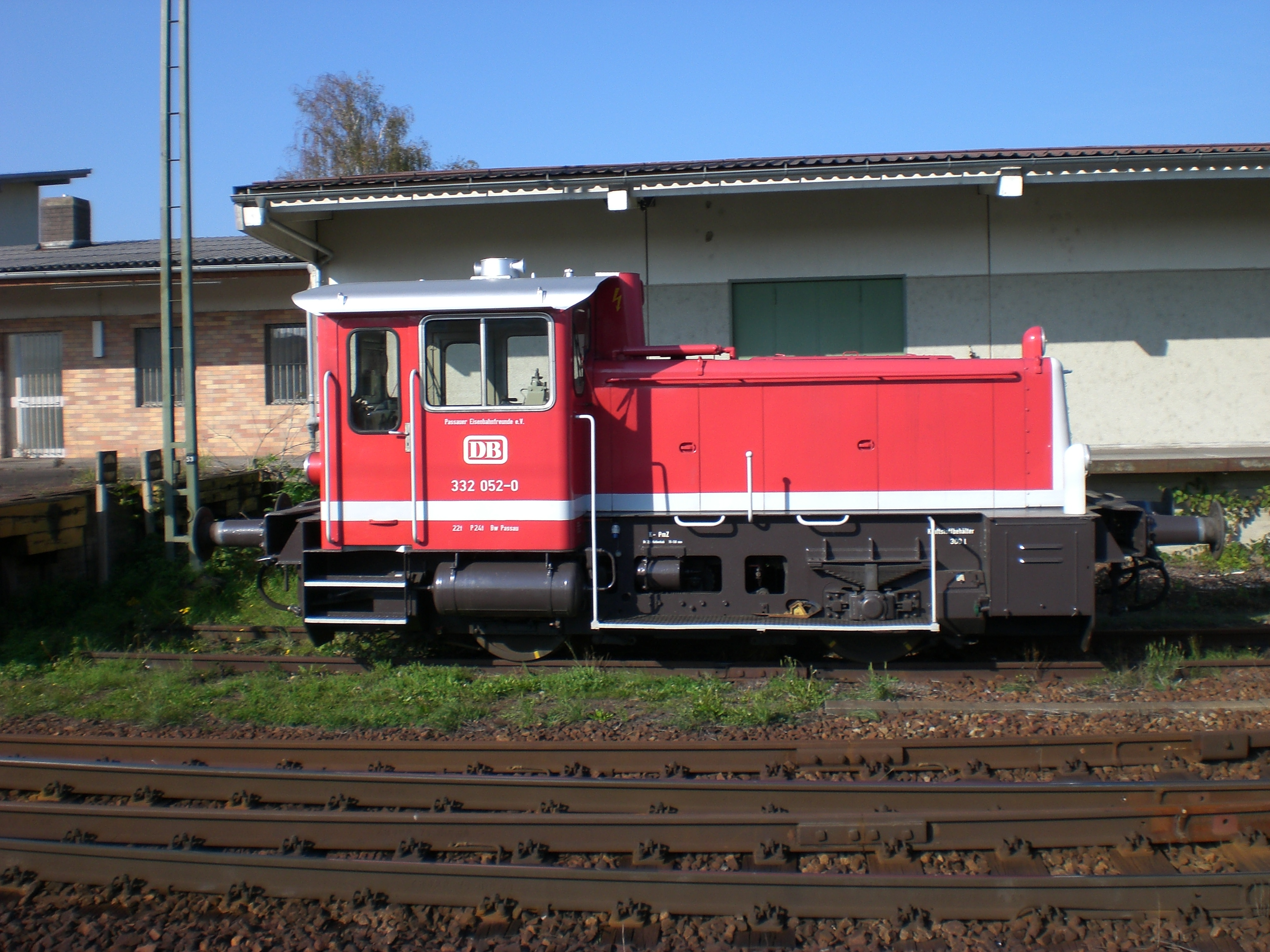
The PEF's Köf III at Vilshofen

In December 2006 a Köf III (332 052–0) was bought from Regensburg locomotive depot (Bahnbetriebswerk) to relieve the V 40. This engine entered service at Bahnbetriebswerk Passau in 1963 and was stationed there until its retirement in 2000. The locomotive was bought from the DB in a pitiful state; the engine was no longer usable because important levers and armatures had been removed from the driver's cab or destroyed. However within a few weeks, the PEF succeeded in getting it into a workable condition. The engine had a general inspection in spring 2007 and is now fully operational again.

=== Auerhahn ===
The Class 018 shunter was built in 1954 for the Peine steelworks. With a power of just 28 PS it is the least powerful engine owned by the society, but at 10 tonnes it is also the lightest. The locomotive was restored in the 1990s as a youth project. It was given its nickname Auerhahn ("capercaillie" or "wood grouse") because of its noise when running, which sounds like a courting capercaillie.

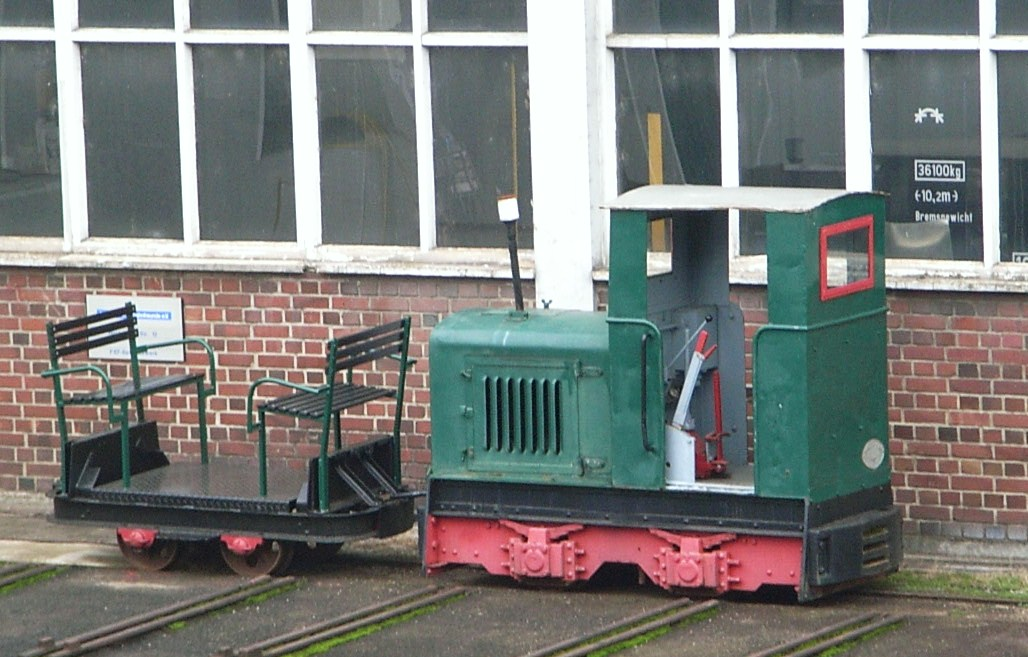
The narrow gauge locomotive with wagons attached

Feldbahnlok

Because there are a few metres of narrow gauge field railway (Feldbahn) track in front of the society's shed, a narrow gauge engine was also obtained. In 2006 a passenger coach was built from the chassis of an old tipper truck, which now runs on the 90 m long line.

=== Skl departmental wagon ===
In order to maintain branch lines that the society has operated for several decades, an engineering vehicle (Rottenkraftwagen), made by the firm of Waggon Union in Berlin, was bought. This departmental wagon is equipped with an Atlas crance in order to lift small loads. To go with it, the society has a heavy small wagon (Schwerkleinwagen) as a load carrier. This pair of wagons can run at a top speed of 70 km/h and has a line certificate.

== Coaches and Wagons ==
=== F-Zug express train ===
Blue liveried coaches of classes Aüe 310, ABüe 333, Büe 366 and ARmz 216 form an F-Zug long-distance express train rake from the 1950s. The F-Zug coaches are currently on long loan to the Ulmer Eisenbahnfreunde. Only the ARmz 216 dining car returned to the PEF in March 2007 because its general inspection was due.

=== "Zigzag" sleeper ===
The last preserved Class WLAsüge 20 sleeping car is owned by the Passauer Eisenbahnfreunden. This type of sleeper was in service between 1950 and 1980. Twenty single bed compartments are distributed on either side of the zigzag-shaped centre corridor. The coach has been given its original ruby-red livery, but is otherwise still in its most recent state technically, with sliding windows, rubber corridor connexions and Minden-Deutz bogies.

=== Saloon coach ===
The saloon coach originally came from the ÖBB, where it belonged to the department for psychological suitability trials. Before that it acted as the mobile office for Hermann Göring. Today the coach has a large lounge, 11 metres long, which can either be laid out with a table along its length order with several tables arranged sideways on. Thus the coach has seating for 20-30 people. In addition it has three compartments with office furnishings (a sofa, writing desk and cupboard) and a shared shower.

=== Accommodation and workshop coach ===
The six-wheeler was originally procured for maintenance duties on the branch lines around Passau and is therefore converted today into a departmental wagon. The coach is well preserved and has interior fittings including a kitchen, sleeping compartment and an office and workshop room.

=== Snow plough ===
The snow plough is a converted steam locomotive tender from 1964. It was restored in winter 2005/2006 and is used to clear the tracks in winter.

=== Low-sided open wagon ===
The low-sided wagon also comes from the ÖBB and was bought in order to transport construction materiel to Passau. Today the wagon primarily serves a cultural purpose, because it acts as a stage. So, for example, for the annual visiting acting troupe from the "Tscheutschlandkurrier". The wagon was repainted in summer 2006 and fully restored.

== Operations ==
Over the years the society has run a lot of special trains on branch lines in the Passau area. In 2002 the Ilztalbahn (Passau-Freyung) and the Passau – Hauzenberg were badly damaged by the worst floods in one hundred years. As a result, they had to be closed which curtailed the society's activities. Strenuous efforts to reopen these lines have not yet met with success. In addition several routes, such as the Hengersberg-Kalteneck and Vilshofen-Aidenbach lines, were dismantled. As a result, in the area of Passau the only lines remaining that are available for specials are the Bavarian Forest railway (the Waldbahn), with its branch to Hengersberg, the Vilshofen-Blindham railway and the Rottalbahn. Since these various branches can no longer be used since their closure, the society runs its specials on other lines today. Usually this is in cooperation with the Austrian Society for Railway History (ÖGEG) which has the necessary rolling stock if the society's VT 798 cannot be used.

== Gastronomy ==
The 'PEF-Gastro' department looks after food catering. As a result of many years experience even large groups can be catered for. Its services range from internal society functions through service and fast-food vehicles to restaurant services in the dining car whilst on the move.

== Site ==
The Passauer Eisenbahnfreunde base is located on the site of the former Bahnbetriebswerk at Passau at no. 12, Haitzingerstraße and covers an area of about 50,000 m^{2}. The site comprises three main areas:

=== Outside area ===
The outside area consists primarily of tracks used for shunting purposes. The control of the points and signals here is carried out by the Passau signal box which also looks after route safety. The signal box is in the immediate vicinity.

=== Shed I ===
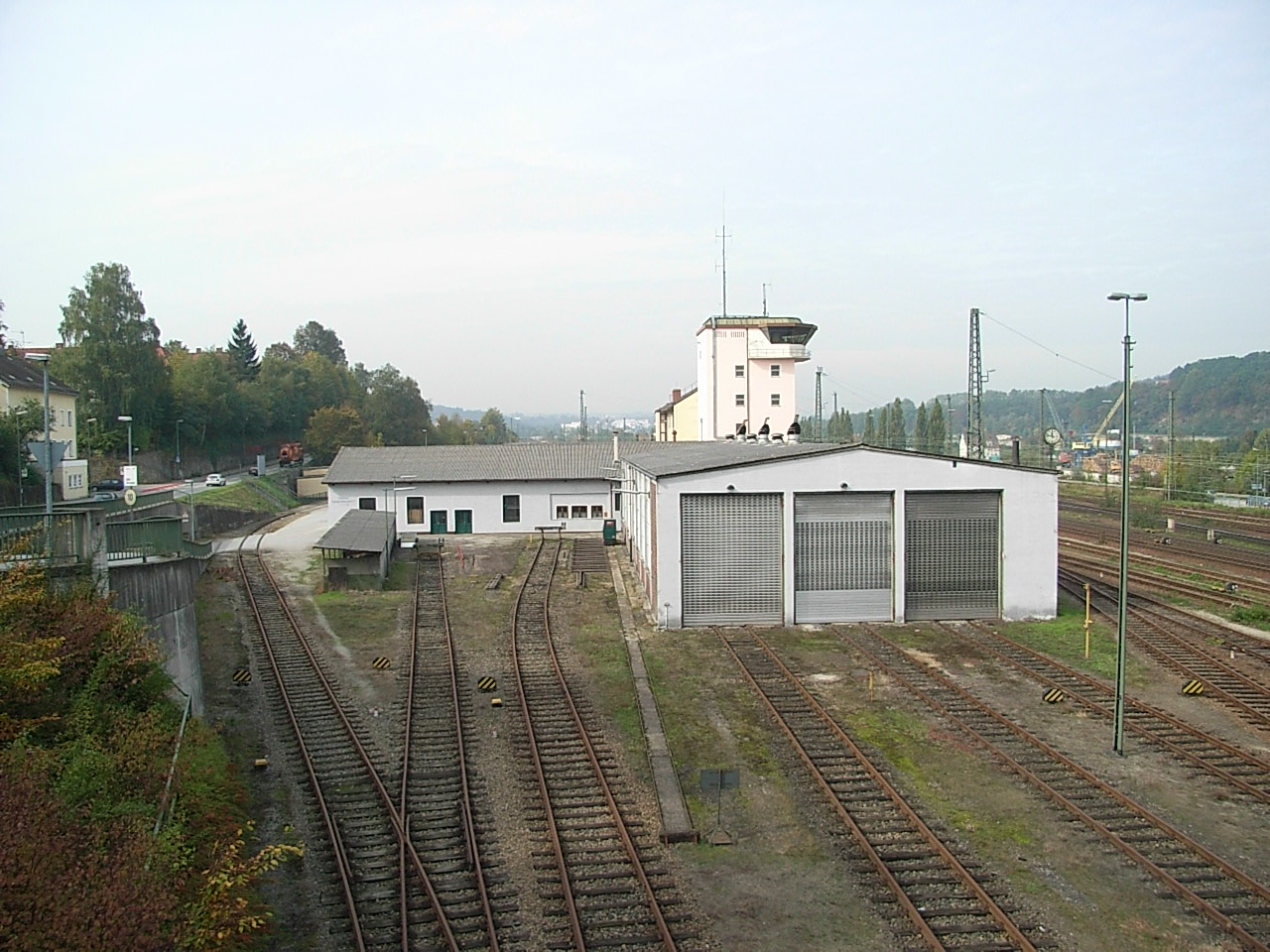
View of Shed I

Halle I is located at the entrance to the site and has a glass front behind which the railcars and various other vehicles may be found. In addition, Shed I houses the main workshop with an area where replacement components can be finished on lathes. There is also a large spare parts store and an office with adjoining society library. Social rooms, such as a kitchen, common room, showers, toilets and overnight accommodation are also located in Shed I.

The shed was originally built by the Deutsche Bundesbahn to maintain its VT98 units and is therefore equipped with a pit, a compressed air station and associated ventilation facilities. So it still fulfils its original purpose even today.

=== Shed II ===
Shed II is located at the other end of the site and, with its two tracks and overall length of about 100 metres it offers the possibility of storing passenger coaches. The shed acts as accommodation for the society's own vehicles or for vehicles belonging to the ÖGEG. This shed also has a store with spare parts for the society's vehicles.

Because the new diesel and electric locomotives did not need turning, unlike their steam-driven predecessors, the old turntable that used to be located here was removed. It was replaced by the Orange Coach Shed (Orange Reisezughalle), because it was now possible to carry out the inspection of coaches based at Passau. The shed is connected to the compressed air system in shed I. In shed II the society has its own lifting gear with a carrying capacity of 64 tonnes which is used to swap axles on vehicles.

== The model railway section ==
Several society members decided in 1983 to build a model railway in H0 gauge, which is devoted to Passau and its surrounding area. Over many years the Passau border station with its two locomotive depots, the DB and ÖBB Betriebswerken, and several branch lines dating to 1955 and 1994, have been modelled with great care and in great detail. Space has been made available at Passau Hauptbahnhof for this and the layout can be viewed on public demonstration days or every Friday from 6 p.m.
