= List of Deutsche Bahn locomotive depots =

This list contains all locomotive depots belonging to the Deutsche Bahn (DB) in Germany today (as at 2006). The official DB term for these depots is Betriebshof (plural Betriebshöfe) – formerly Bahnbetriebswerke.

| Name of the depot | Business area responsible | Abbreviation |
|---|---|---|
| Berlin-Friedrichsfelde | Berlin S-Bahn | BFF |
| Berlin-Grünau | Berlin S-Bahn | BGA |
| Berlin Ostbahnhof | DB Fernverkehr | BHF |
| Berlin-Rummelsburg | DB Fernverkehr | BRGB |
| Berlin-Wannsee | Berlin S-Bahn | BWS |
| Braunschweig | DB Regio | HBS |
| Bremen | Railion | HB 1 |
| Bremerhaven | Railion | HBH |
| Chemnitz | DB Regio | DC |
| Cottbus | DB Regio | BCS |
| Darmstadt | DB Regio | FD |
| Dortmund | DB Regio | EDO |
| Dresden | DB Regio/Railion | DH |
| Düsseldorf | DB Regio | KD |
| Emden | Railion | HE |
| Erfurt | DB Regio | UE |
| Essen | DB Regio | EEH |
| Frankfurt 1 | DB Fernverkehr/DB Regio | FF 1 |
| Frankfurt-Griesheim | DB Fernverkehr | FFG |
| Frankfurt Hbf | DB Regio (Frankfurt S-Bahn) | FF |
| Freiburg | DB Regio | RF |
| Gießen | Railion | FG |
| Görlitz | DB Regio | DG |
| Gremberg | Railion | KG |
| Hagen | DB Regio/Railion | EHG |
| Halle G | Railion | LH 1 |
| Halle DB P | DB Regio | LH 2 |
| Haltingen | DB Regio/Railion | RHL |
| Hamburg-Eidelstedt | DB Fernverkehr | AH 1 |
| Hamburg-Ohlsdorf | Hamburg S-Bahn | AH 6 |
| Hamburg-Wilhelmsburg | Railion | AH 4 |
| Hannover | DB Regio/Railion | HH |
| Hof | DB Fernverkehr/DB Regio/Railion | NHO |
| Ingolstadt | Railion | MIH |
| Kaiserslautern | DB Regio | SKL |
| Karlsruhe | DB Regio/Railion | RK |
| Kassel | DB Regio/Railion | FK |
| Kempten | DB Regio | MKP |
| Kiel | DB Regio | AK |
| Köln-Deutzerfeld | DB Regio | KK |
| Kornwestheim | Railion | TK |
| Leipzig Süd | DB Regio | LL 1 |
| Leipzig West | DB Regio | LL 2 |
| Limburg | DB Regio | FL |
| Lübeck | Db Regio | AL |
| Ludwigshafen | DB Regio | RL |
| Magdeburg | DB Regio | LM 1 |
| Magdeburg-Rothensee | Railion | LMR |
| Mainz-Bischofsheim | Railion | FMB |
| Mannheim Rbf | Railion | RMR |
| Mühldorf | DB Regio/Railion | MHF |
| München West | DB Fernverkehr/DB Regio/Railion | MH 1 |
| München Steinhausen | DB Regio (Munich S-Bahn) | MH 6 |
| München Süd | Railion | MH 2 |
| Münster (Westf) | DB Regio | EMST |
| Nürnberg Rbf | Railion | NN 2 |
| Nürnberg West | DB Regio | NN 1 |
| Oberhausen | Railion | EOB |
| Offenburg | Railion | RO |
| Osnabrück | DB Regio/Railion | HO |
| Plochingen | DB Regio (Stuttgart S-Bahn) | TP |
| Regensburg | DB Regio | NRH |
| Rostock | DB Regio | WR 1 |
| Rostock Seehafen | Railion | WRS |
| Saalfeld | Railion | US |
| Saarbrücken Ost | DB Regio/Railion | SSH |
| Seddin | Railion | BSE |
| Seelze | Railion | HS |
| Senftenberg | Railion | BSN |
| Stendal | DB Regio | LS |
| Stuttgart | DB Regio | TS |
| Trier | DB Regio | STR |
| Tübingen | DB Regio | TT |
| Ulm | DB Regio/Railion | TU |
| Würzburg | Railion | NWH |
| Zwickau | Railion | DZW |

== See also ==
- Deutsche Bahn
- List of locomotive depots in Germany

== Sources ==
- Jan Reiners: So funktioniert das Bahnbetriebswerk. Transpress Verlag, Stuttgart 2006, ISBN 3-613-71279-2, page 35
