= Bahnbetriebswerk Passau =

Locomotive shed in Passau, Germany

Coordinates: 48°34′21.5″N 13°26′11″E

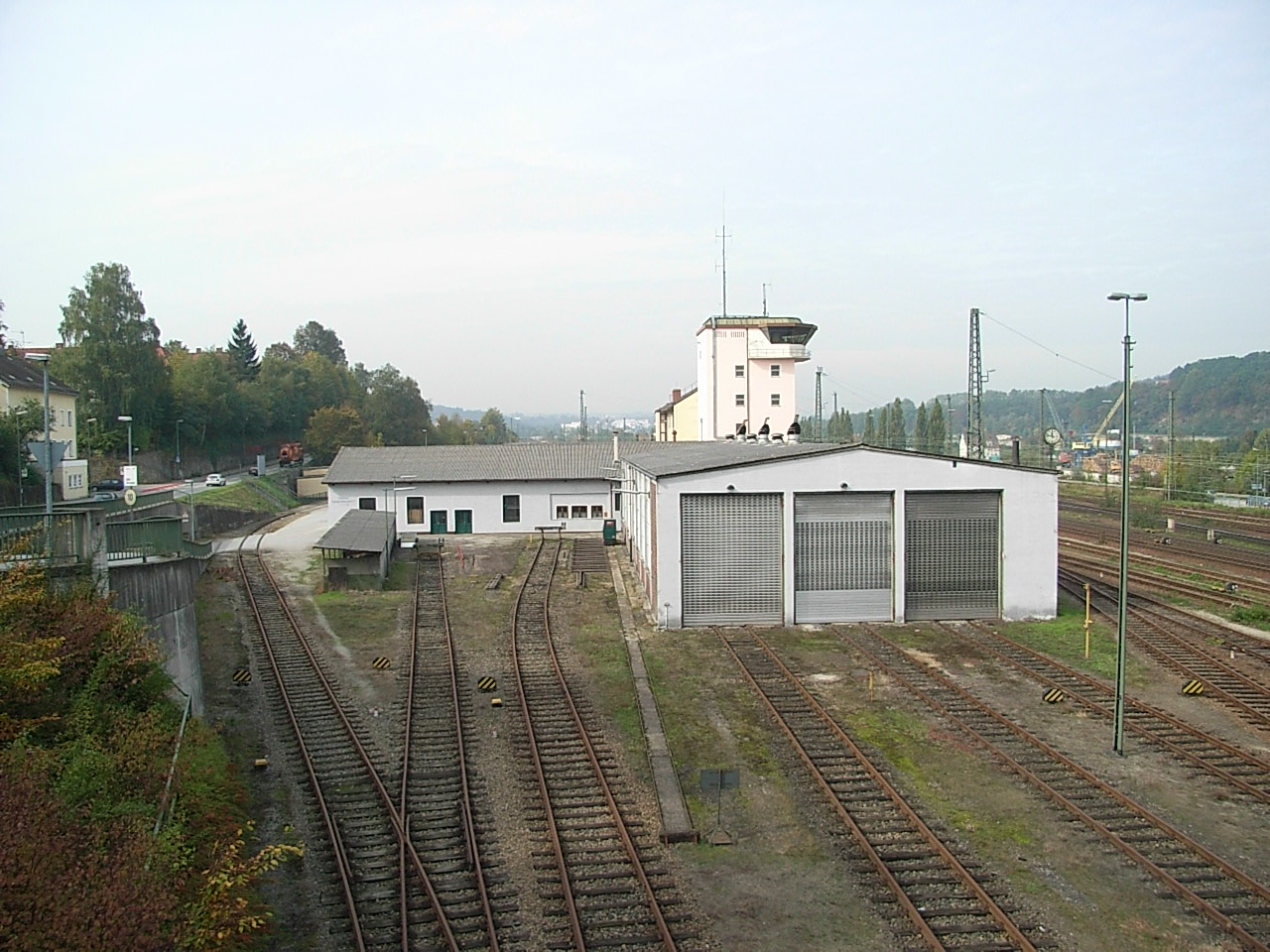
The preserved locomotive shed

The Bahnbetriebswerk Passau (abbr: Bw Passau) is the locomotive shed that belongs to Passau's main station, the Hauptbahnhof.

Passau Hauptbahnhof was opened on 1 September 1861, with its first shed. It was initially a terminal station until the 1.5 km long section over the river Inn to Empress Elisabeth Railway from Wels on the Austrian side was taken into service. This now meant that railway traffic could now operate from Frankfurt am Main to Vienna via Passau. This border station was now operated by two separate railway companies and operating interest was generated by the changeover of locomotives there.

In 1865 a railway link was built by a private railway company to the river port on the Danube next to Passau town hall. This was transferred to the Royal Bavarian State Railways on 1 January 1876. After the site had been extended several times over the course of the years and several branch lines had been taken into service, the Bahnbetriebswerk had to move to Haitzingerstraße in 1906. 150,000 m^{2} of earth was moved and a twenty-road roundhouse with an adjoining two-road workshop was erected, together with a six-road workshop and traverser, which stamped its mark on the appearance of the site for 70 years.

Because of the Obernzell to Wegscheid line, the only rack railway in the Royal Bavarian State Railways, new locomotives were constantly being tested at Bw Passau. The PtzL 3/4 (later DRG Class 97.1) was only ever stabled here; the first trials on the Uerdingen railbus, the VT 95, VT98.9 und VT97, took place here, as did testing for the road-rail vehicle and the V 100, which worked the line until the Class 213 (the variant for steep inclines, the V100.10) succeeded it.

This depot has stabled numerous steam locomotives, but over time they were replaced by diesel or electric locos. After the closure of passenger services on several routes as well as the withdrawal of goods traffic and the dismantling of the Obernzell - Wegscheid line and the disbandment of the Regensburg railway division the depot was subordinated to the Nuremberg division. The departure of the locomotives to other depots began in the 1960s and was completed in 1978. The last modification took place in 1976 and saw the demolition of the roundhouse. In its place the present day Orange Shed, for the maintenance of railbuses, and a workshop were erected. After the depot was closed in 2000, the property was entrusted to a local railway society, the Passauer Eisenbahnfreunde (PEF), who are housed on the site.

The old Betriebswerk Passau can now only be seen as an H0 gauge model in the cellar of Passau Hauptbahnhof. The railway modelling section of the PEF had the aim of building a model with a historical background; as a result the depots of both the German and Austrian railways - the Deutsche Bundesbahn and ÖBB - are depicted as is Passau station and several neighbouring branch lines.

== Sources ==
- de:Bahnbetriebswerk Passau

== See also ==
- List of locomotive depots in Germany
- Royal Bavarian State Railways
- Deutsche Reichsbahn
- Deutsche Bundesbahn
