= Vilshofen–Ortenburg railway =

Railway line in Bavaria, Germany

Vilshofen−Ortenburg
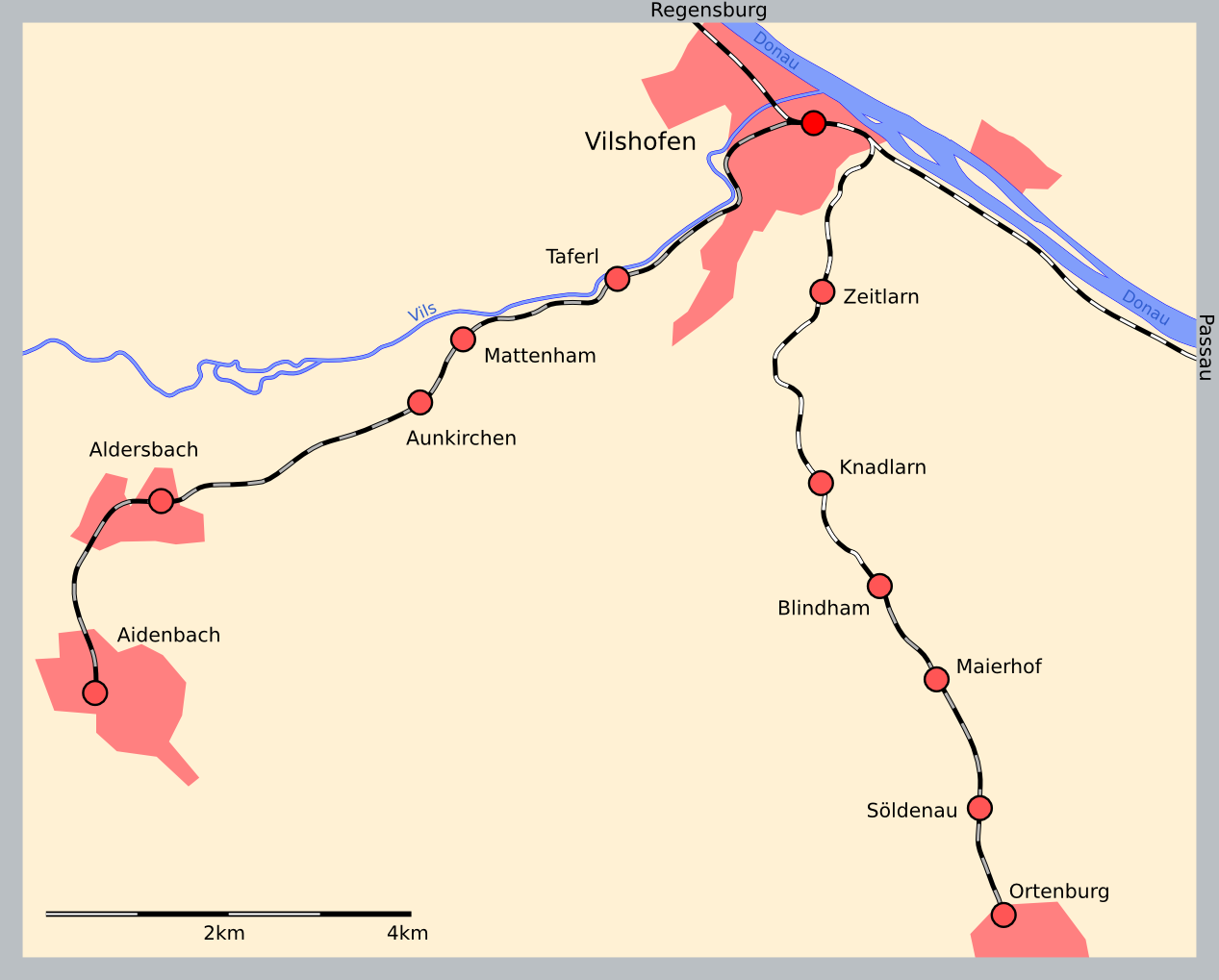

Overview
- Line number: 5833

Service
- Route number: ex 417 k

Technical
- Line length: 10.9 km (6.8 mi)
- Track gauge: 1,435 mm (4 ft 8 1/2 in)

The Vilshofen (Lower Bavaria)–Ortenburg railway, also known as the Wolfach Valley Railway (German: Wolfachtalbahn), is a branch line or Lokalbahn in the province of Lower Bavaria in southern Germany. It was opened on 16 January 1908 and closed to passenger services on 30 September 1962.

The original plans in 1861 envisaged a link from Simbach to Vilshofen via Pocking and Ortenburg, but they were dropped in favour of the present-day Rot Valley Railway (Rottalbahn) from Pocking to Passau via Fürstenzell which entered service in 1879. In 1824/25 a main road (today the B8) was built along the Danube to Passau, which undermined the importance of the old main route from Vilshofen via Ortenburg to Passau.

Similarly in 1861 the main railway line on the right bank of the Danube from Vilshofen to Passau was opened, almost totally isolating the Protestant town of Ortenburg. When, in 1898, the Vilshofen–Aidenbach railway was opened, there were fears that Ortenburg would never get a railway link. The 1897 proposal for the construction of a narrow gauge railway line fell on deaf ears and a request for financial support for a private railway was not approved either. So in September 1899 the population appealed to Prince Regent Luitpold. In spring of 1900, Munich indicated that the route would be included in the bill for the next Lokalbahn phase.

With the income from beer and malt taxes, which were charged for ten years, the land was purchased and on 10 August 1904 approval was given for the construction of the Lokalbahn along the Wolfach River. Planning began as soon as September 1904 and construction of the line started in November 1906. It was built rapidly and the first test runs were successfully concluded on 8 January 1908. On 16 January 1908 the line was opened to the public with a great celebration.

Because makeshift wartime coaches were used with just the occasional modern railbuses, after the Second World War passenger numbers dropped markedly and services were finally withdrawn on 30 September 1962 in spite of protests and petitions from the local population. That also meant the loss of some of the express goods and parcel services. This led to the station at Ortenburg being closed on 1 June 1975.

Goods traffic from Neustift-Blindham to Ortenburg ended on 31 October 1994. The Raiffeisenbank central depot switched to road transport from that point on and a partial closure of the line was only to be expected — and took effect for the part between Neustift-Blindham and Ortenburg on April 2, 1995.

The Lower Bavarian Ballast Works (Niederbayerische Schotterwerke) and the asphalt works of the firm of Berger Bau continue to be served by Deutsche Bahn. There were also occasional special trains operated by the Passau Railway Society.

A 3 kilometre long cycle path from Maierhof via Söldenau to Ortenburg on the track formation of the embankment was opened in November 2002.

== See also ==
- Royal Bavarian State Railways
- Bavarian branch lines
- List of closed railway lines in Bavaria
