= Bayerische Regionaleisenbahn =

The Bayerische Regionaleisenbahn or BRE (literally: Bavarian Regional Railway) is a German railway company and a subsidiary of Deutsche Regionaleisenbahn (DRE). Its headquarters is in Weidenberg and, since 2004, it has mainly acted as a railway infrastructure company. Its primary aim is to prevent the closure and associated disposal of railway routes in the state of Bavaria. This is achieved either by the signing of route protection agreements with the former owners, DB Netz, or by taking over the routes either by rental or purchase.

== Routes ==
The following routes in Bavaria are maintained or rented by the BRE:

- KBS 809: Lower Franconian Steigerwald line: Gochsheim (Ufr)–Kitzingen–Etwashausen
- KBS 819: Upper Franconian Steigerwald line: Strullendorf–Schlüsselfeld
- KBS 862: Fichtelgebirgsbahn: Bayreuth–Warmensteinach; Bayreuth–Weidenberg (rented to Landkreis Bayreuth; Infrastructure maintained by BRE)
- KBS 881: Granite line: Passau-Voglau–Hauzenberg
- KBS 881: Lower Danube Valley railway: Erlau–Obernzell

== See also ==
- Deutsche Regionaleisenbahn
