= Passau–Hauzenberg railway =

Railway line in Germany

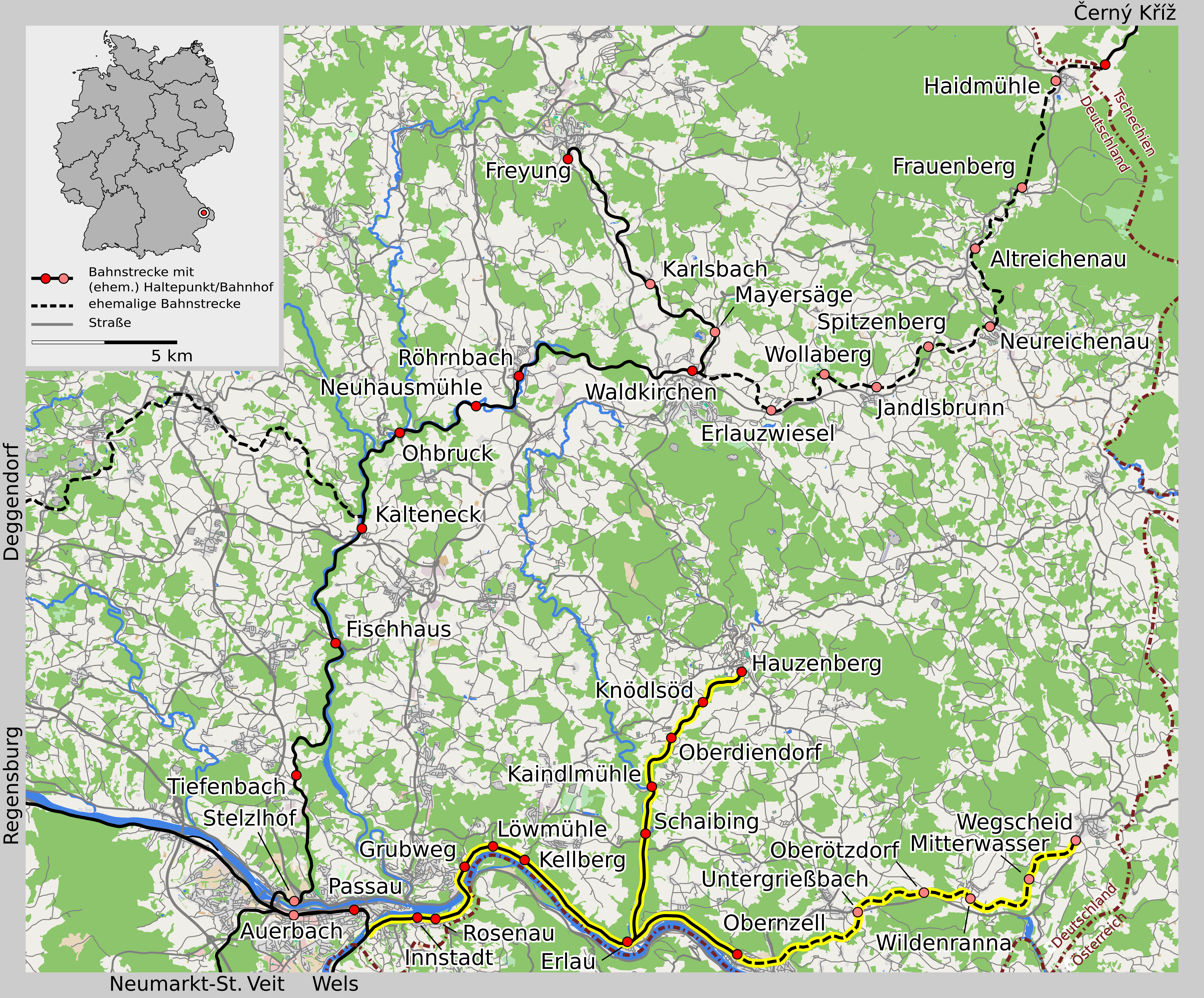

Overview
- Line number: 5843

Service
- Route number: 881

Technical
- Line length: 23.9 kilometres (14.9 mi)
- Track gauge: 1,435 mm (4 ft 8 1/2 in)
- Operating speed: 60 km/h
- Maximum incline: 25 ‰

Passau–Hauzenberg railway

Overview
- Line number: 5844

Technical
- Line length: 20,2 km
- Rack system: Strub
- Track gauge: 1435 mm
- Minimum radius: 200 m
- Operating speed: 30 km/h
- Maximum incline: adhesion 25 ‰ rack rail 71 ‰

The Passau–Erlau–Hauzenberg railway is a single-tracked branch line in the Regensburg railway division with a branch to Erlau–Obernzell(–Wegscheid), which was partially operated as rack railway using the Strub rack system.

== Dates ==
- Completion of the Kräutelstein bridge from the Innstadt over the Danube: 1903
- Opening of the Passau–Hauzenberg line: 25 November 1904
- Opening of the Erlau–Obernzell line: 15 May 1909
- Opening of the Obernzell–Wegscheid line: 1 December 1912
- Closure of the Obernzell-Wegscheid line: 28 January 1965, dismantled in spring 1975.
- On 24 November 2007 the Bavarian Regional Railway rented the Passau–Hauzenberg railway and the Erlau-Obernzell section, and announced that they would be opened again.

== The granite route ==
The originally planned course for this railway was quite different. In 1895 the intention was for a line that branched off the Freyung railway at Fischhaus and ran via Büchlberg and Hauzenberg to Wegscheid. This would have entailed a long detour and a climb of 130 metres. Because the costs would have been too high, a link between Wegscheid and Hauzenberg was not essential, the present-day route was proposed. Approval for its construction was issued on 30 June 1900.

== The Passau–Erlau–Hauzenberg railway ==
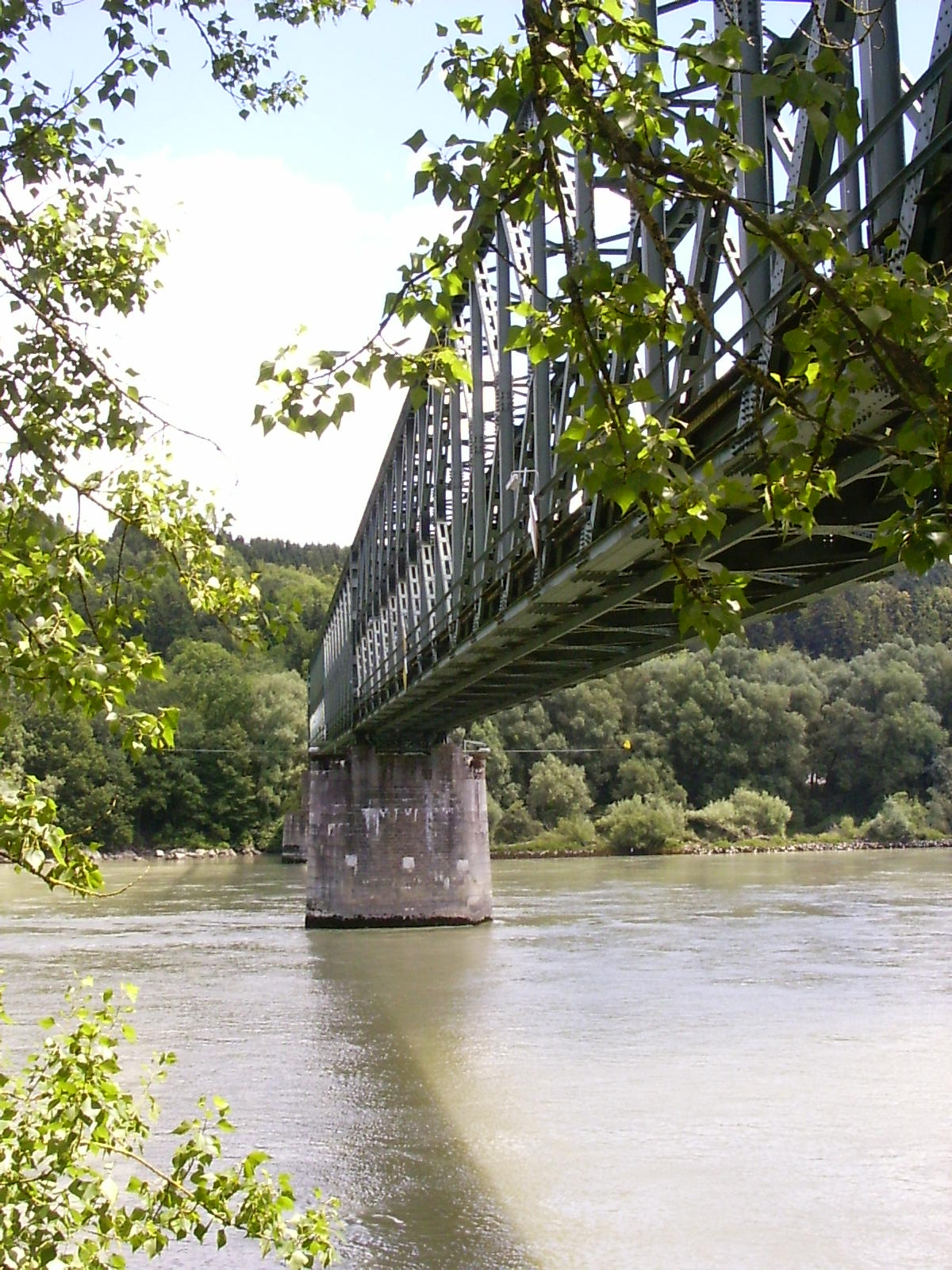
The Kräutelstein bridge

Between Passau Hauptbahnhof and the suburb of Voglau the railway shares its tracks with Wels–Passau railway. Due to the restricted amount of space the railway branches shortly before Maximilians bridge (a railway bridge over the Inn) with into a backshunt (Spitzkehre, see table photo) at the 1.0 km marker. From there it runs along the Inn on the edge of the village of Innstadt over the Rosenau until just before the border with Austria at Achleiten. It was here between 1900 and 1903 that the Kräutelstein bridge was built over the Danube by the firms of Hellinger and MAN. From now on railway passengers could enjoy the full splendour of the Danube to their left as they travelled through Löwmühle (formerly a halt) to Erlau. From here the line climbed uphill alongside the Erlau river to Hauzenberg. The station at Erlau was only provided with one platform, which was not helpful for the subsequent crossing of trains from Wegscheid and Hauzenberg. Just as difficult was the working service. The railway reached Schaibing station through a 34 m long tunnel, but the village of Schaibing was a long way off and the station and this acted mainly as a loading and unloading site for goods from and to the surrounding villages. The line continued up the Erlau valley as far as Kaindlmühle and from here it followed the Staffelbach stream to Oberdiendorf. However the village was on the hill, the station in the valley, and goods were transported to the station using a cable car. The railway then ran through the woods via Knödlsöd (former halt at 23.5 km), past Freiflächen, to Hauzenberg. On 18 April 1904 the first train ran from Passau to Erlau. Hauzenberg lies at a height of 177.7 m above the Passau Hauptbahnhof, so inclines of 1:50 from Erlau and 1:40 from Kaindlmühle had to be overcome. The climb to the Kräutelstein bridge was also steep.

== The Erlau–Obernzell–Wegscheid railway ==
The Erlau–Obernzell railway ran picturesquely along the Danube until it swung away into the mountains towards Wegscheid at Obernzell (300 m above NN) over the viaduct (demolished in 1982). From there it entered the rack railway section between 5.67 and 9.48 km from the start, running uphill to Untergriesbach (542,7m above NN), on through curves with radii as little as 200 m, and on inclines of up to 25 per mille on the adhesion section to Withterwasser (535,0 m ü. NN) in order to overcome the height difference. Next came another rack section (70 per mille) from 17.29 to 19.67 km before it reached Wegscheid (574,2 m above NN). For this railway, special steam locomotives were built, even during the planning and construction stages, by the firm of Krauss in Munich. These were Class PtzL 3/4 locomotives, passenger tank engines with a rack railway system, three of the four axles being driven, with the works numbers 4101–4003, 8033. Later they were taken over by the Deutsche Reichsbahn and operated as numbers 97 101 to 104 from Bw Passau. The first loco was delivered in 1912, two more quickly followed but the fourth was not supplied until 1923. The running speed on adhesion sections of the line was just 30 km/h, and on the rack railway sections 12 km/h.

With construction of the B 388 federal highway and the introduction of buses and lorries the retention of the railway was contested. Attempts were made to utilise the lines capacity better, in 1951 using Büssing road-rail buses (Schi-Stra-Bus) and in 1957 using the rack railway variant of the Uerdingen railbus, the VT97 901–903 (later Class 798 with rack drive). However, in 1960, the DB placed buses in parallel working and made plans for the line's closure. These might possibly have been rejected, however the line became impassable as the result of a rockfall on 28 January 1965 and it was dismantled in 1975.

The railway would have still been important today, because granite and graphite are mined in this area. The agricultural and forestry industries transport a large amount of produce by road and the line would also have been useful for tourism. One section of the railway is, like so many branch lines today, a footpath and cycle way. The Erlau–Obernzell line still exists as does the Passau–Hauzenberg railway, but since the floods in 2002 they have been closed. The DB refuses to reactivate it; repairs to the section at Innstadt are however are manageable. This section was renewed only a few months before the flood, as can be still be seen today from the light-coloured ballast. The Passau Railway Society as well as a citizen's lobby are fighting for the retention of these lines.

The station of Wegscheid has been modelled in 1:87 (HO gauge) scale as at 1955 by the Passau Railway Society and may be viewed at Passau's main station, the Hauptbahnhof.

== Sources ==
- Verein for Touristik e.V. Hauzenberg (Herausgeber): Das Hauzenberger Bockerl. The Localbahn von Passau nach Hauzenberg. Regionale Verkehrsgeschichte, EK-Verlag, Freiburg (2002) ISBN 3-88255-452-5

== See also ==
- List of closed railway lines in Bavaria
- Bavarian branch lines
- Royal Bavarian State Railways
