= List of locomotive depots in Germany =

This list of locomotive depots (Bahnbetriebswerke) in Germany includes all those within the borders of the Deutsches Reich in 1937, which were at sometime between 1920 and 1994 independent facilities. They are grouped by the divisions (Direktionen) that existed in 1994, with the exception of those divisions east of the Oder-Neisse line. The year when they were closed as independent depots is given in brackets after the name. For a list of currently active locomotive depots in Germany see the List of Deutsche Bahn locomotive depots.

== Berlin Division ==
Bw Basdorf · Bw Berlin-Anhalter Bahnhof · Bw Berlin-Gesundbrunnen · Bw Berlin-Grunewald · Bw Berlin-Grünau · Bw Berlin-Hundekehle · Bw Berlin-Lehrter Bahnhof · Bw Berlin-Lichtenberg · Bw Berlin-Nordbahnhof · Bw Berlin-Pankow · Bw Berlin-Papestraße · Bw Berlin-Potsdamer Güterbahnhof · Bw Berlin-Rummelsburg · Bw Berlin-Schlesischer Gbf · Bw Berlin-Schöneweide Vbf · Bw Berlin-Tempelhof Vbf · Bw Berlin-Wannsee · Bw Cottbus · Bw Elsterwerda · Bw Erkner · Bw Forst · Bw Frankfurt (Oder) Pbf · Bw Frankfurt (Oder) Vbf · Bw Guben · Bw Hoyerswerda · Bw Jüterbog · Bw Luckau · Bw Lübbenau · Bw Muskau · Bw Potsdam · Bw Seddin · Bw Senftenberg · Bw Straupitz · Bw Wriezen · Bw Wustermark Vbf

== Breslau Division ==
Bw Breslau Hbf · Bw Breslau-Freiburger Bf · Bw Breslau-Mochbern · Bw Brockau · Bw Brieg · Bw Königszelt · Bw Glatz · Bw Strehlen · Bw Kamenz · Bw Oels · Bw Schweidnitz · Bw Liegnitz · Bw Arnsdorf · Bw Sagan · Bw Sommerfeld · Bw Kohlfurt · Bw Hirschberg Hbf · Bw Lauban · Bw Schlauroth · Bw Waldenburg-Dittersbach · Bw Trautenau

== Dresden Division ==
Bw Adorf · Bw Arnsdorf · Bw Aue · Bw Bautzen · Bw Bischofswerda · Bw Buchholz · Bw Dresden-Altstadt · Bw Dresden-Friedrichstadt · Bw Dresden-Pieschen · Bw Chemnitz Hbf · Bw Chemnitz-Hilbersdorf · Bw Döbeln · Bw Falkenstein · Bw Flöha · Bw Freiberg · Bw Glauchau · Bw Görlitz · Bw Kamenz · Bw Löbau · Bw Mügeln · Bw Nossen · Bw Pirna · Bw Pockau-Lengefeld · Bw Reichenbach · Bw Riesa · Bw Rochlitz · Bw Bad Schandau · Bw Schwarzenberg · Bw Werdau · Bw Wilsdruff · Bw Zittau · Bw Zwickau

== Erfurt Division ==
Bw Arnstadt (um 1993) · Bw Eisenach (2004) · Bw Erfurt · Bw Gera · Bw Gerstungen (1952) · Bw Gotha (1974) · Bw Meiningen (DB: 1999) · Bw Nordhausen · Bw Probstzella · Bw Saalfeld · Bw Suhl · Bw Vacha (1974) · Bw Sonneberg · Bw Sangerhausen · Bw Weißenfels

== Essen Division ==
To 1974 partly in Elberfeld Division (from 1930: Wuppertal)

Bw Altenhundem (1966) · Bw Arnsberg (1953) · Bw Bestwig (1982) · Bw Betzdorf (1982) · Bw Bielefeld (1985) · Bw Bocholt (1953) · Bw Bochum-Dahlhausen (1969) · Bw Bochum-Langendreer (1966) · Bw Bochum Nord (1954) · Bw Brügge (1953) · Bw Coesfeld (1951) · Bw Dortmund Bbf · Bw Dortmunderfeld (1960) ·Bw Dortmund Rbf (1982) · Bw Dortmund Süd (1953) · Bw Duisburg Hbf (1966) · Bw Duisburg-Wedau (1977) · Bw Duisburg-Ruhrort Hafen (1966) · Bw Erndtebrück (1963) · Bw Essen Hbf (1986) · Bw Essen Nord (1961) · Bw Finnentrop (1976) · Bw Fröndenberg (1954) · Bw Gelsenkirchen-Bismarck (1982) · Bw Gelsenkirchen Hbf (1951) · Bw Gronau(1957) · Bw Gütersloh (1969) · Bw Hagen-Eckesey · Bw Hagen Gbf (1968) · Bw Hagen-Vorhalle (1966) · Bw Haltern (1967)) · Bw Hamm · Bw Hattingen (1951) · Bw Herford (1954) · Bw Herne (1953) · Bw Holzwickede (1954) · Bw Kettwig (1953) · Bw Kreuztal (1953) · Bw Kupferdreh (1953) · Bw Letmathe (1960) · Bw Mülheim-Speldorf (1953) · Bw Mülheim-Styrum (1954) · Bw Münster (1985) · Bw Oberhausen Hbf (1978) · Bw Oberhausen-Osterfeld Süd · Bw Oberhausen West (1959) · Bw Olpe (1953) · Bw Paderborn (1983) · Bw Recklinghausen Hbf (1970) · Bw Siegen · Bw Soest (1967) · Bw Schwerte (1966) · Bw Wanne-Eickel · Bw Wesel (1966) · Bw Witten (1953)

== Frankfurt (Main) Division ==
Bw Alzey (1952) · Bw Bebra · Bw Bingerbrück (1965) · Bw Darmstadt-Hbf · Bw Darmstadt-Kranichstein (1960) · Bw Dillenburg (1984) · Bw Elm(1951) · Bw Eschwege-West (1974) · Bw Frankenberg (1956) · Bw Frankfurt 1 · Bw Frankfurt 2 · Bw Frankfurt 3 (1958) · Bw Frankfurt-Griesheim (1967) · Bw Frankfurt-Ost (1960) · Bw Friedberg (1982) · Bw Fulda · Bw Gießen · Bw Hanau (1982) · Bw Kassel · Bw Limburg · Bw Mainz-Bischofsheim (1984) · Bw Mainz-Hbf (1990) · Bw Marburg (1983) · Bw Offenbach (1958) · Bw Treysa (1967) · Bw Weinheim (1958) · Bw Wetzlar (1962) · Bw Wiesbaden (1981) · Bw Worms (1984)

== Halle (Saale) Division ==
Bw Altenburg · Bw Bitterfeld · Bw Dessau · Bw Eilenburg · Bw Engelsdorf · Bw Falkenberg (Elster) · Bw Großkorbetha · Bw Halle G · Bw Halle Klaustor · Bw Halle P · Bw Leipzig Bayer Bf · Bw Leipzig Hbf Nord · Bw Leipzig Hbf Süd · Bw Leipzig Hbf West · Bw Leipzig-Plagwitz · Bw Leipzig-Wahren · Bw Merseburg · Bw Meuselwitz · Bw Röblingen am See (1992) · Bw Roßlau · Bw Torgau · Bw Wittenberg · Bw Zeitz

== Hamburg Division ==
Bw Buchholz (Kreis Harburg) (1980) · Bw Cuxhaven (1960) · Bw Flensburg · Bw Hamburg-Altona (1983) · Bw Hamburg-Berlinertor (1966) · Bw Hamburg-Eidelstedt · Bw Hamburg-Harburg (1980) · Bw Hamburg-Ohlsdorf · Bw Hamburg-Rothenburgsort (1972) · Bw Hamburg-Wilhelmsburg · Bw Heide (1953) · Bw Heiligenhafen (1963) · Bw Husum (1986) · Bw Itzehoe (1963) · Bw Kiel · Bw Lübeck · Bw Lüneburg (1960) · Bw Neumünster (1970) · Bw Puttgarden (1982) · Bw Rendsburg (1954)

== Hannover Division ==
Bw Altenbeken · Bw Börßum (1958) · Bw Bremen Hbf · Bw Bremen Rbf (1984) · Bw Bremen Walle (1957) · Bw Bremerhaven Geestemünde (1966) · Bw Bremerhaven (Lehe) · Bw Braunschweig Hbf (1960) · Bw Braunschweig Vbf · Bw Celle (1964) · Bw Delmenhorst (1973) · Bw Emden · Bw Göttingen Pbf · Bw Göttingen Vbf (1965) · Bw Goslar (1972) · Bw Hameln (1982) ·Bw Hannover Hbf · Bw Hannover Hgbf (1968) · Bw Hannover Linden (1965) · Bw Helmstedt (1967) · Bw Hildesheim (1986) ·Bw Holzminden (1978) · Bw Kirchweyhe (1968) · Bw Kreiensen (1963) · Bw Löhne (1984) · Bw Lehrte (1976) · Bw Minden (1969) · Bw Nienburg (Weser) (1973) · Bw Norden (1953) · Bw Nordenham (1983) · Bw Nordstemmen (1951) · Bw Northeim (1978) · Bw Oldenburg Hbf · Bw Oldenburg Vbf (1967) · Bw Osnabrück Hbf · Bw Osnabrück Rbf (1967) · Bw Ottbergen (1976) · Bw Rahden (1978) · Bw Rheine (1983) · Bw Scherfede (1950) · Bw Seelze · Bw Seesen (1954) · Bw Soltau (1960) · Bw Uelzen (1982) · Bw Wangerooge · Bw Warburg (1959) · Bw Wilhelmshaven (1961) · Bw Wunstorf (1951)

== Karlsruhe Division ==
Bw Basel Bad (1957) · Bw Bruchsal (1958) · Bw Freiburg · Bw Heidelberg (1989) · Bw Haltingen · Bw Karlsruhe Hbf · Bw Karlsruhe Rbf (1960) · Bw Konstanz (1968) · Bw Landau (1983) · Bw Ludwigshafen (1986) · Bw Mannheim Hbf (1954) · Bw Mannheim Rbf · Bw Neckarelz (1954) · Bw Neustadt (1958) · Bw Offenburg · Bw Radolfzell (1985) · Bw Singen · Bw Villingen (1977) · Bw Waldshut (1967)

== Cologne Division ==
To 1974 partly in Elberfeld Division (from 1930: Wuppertal)

Bw Aachen-Hbf (1963) · Bw Aachen-West · Bw Altenkirchen (1979) · Bw Bensberg (1951) · Bw Bergheim (1961) · Bw Bonn (1960) · Bw Düsseldorf Abstellbahnhof, Bw Düsseldorf-Derendorf (1981) · Bw Düsseldorf-Hbf · Bw Dieringhausen(1982) · Bw Düren (1983) · Bw Engers (1957) · Bw Euskirchen (1966) · Bw Geldern (1967) · Bw Gremberg · Bw Herzogenrath (1950) · Bw Hohenbudberg (1983) · Bw Jülich (1959) · Bw Jünkerath (1966) · Bw Kleve (1963) · Bw Köln-Bbf (1964) · Bw Köln-Deutzerfeld · Bw Köln-Eifeltor (1973) · Bw Köln-Kalk Nord (1959) · Bw Köln-Nippes (1990) · Bw Koblenz-Lützel (1968) · Bw Koblenz-Mosel (1988) · Bw Krefeld (1992) · Bw Kreuzberg (1959) · Bw Linz (1954) · Bw Mayen (1983) · Bw Mönchengladbach · Bw Neuss (1975) · Bw Niederlahnstein (1951) · Bw Oberlahnstein (1962) · Bw Opladen (1960) · Bw Ratingen-West (1951) · Bw Remscheid-Lennep (1960) · Bw Rheydt (1975) · Bw Solingen-Ohligs (1950) · Bw Stolberg (1976) · Bw Würselen (1950) · Bw Wuppertal-Langerfeld (1964) · Bw Wuppertal-Steinbeck · Bw Wuppertal-Vohwinkel (1971)

== Königsberg Division ==
Bw Königsberg · Bw Korschen · Bw Insterburg · Bw Tilsit · Bw Eydtkau · Bw Memel · Bw Allenstein · Bw Osterode · Bw Scharfenwiese · Bw Lyck · Bw Prostken · Bw Angerburg · Bw Guwalki · Bw Mohrungen

== Nuremberg Division ==
Bw Ansbach · Bw Aschaffenburg · Bw Bamberg (ca. 1980) · Bw Bayreuth · Bw Gemünden/Main · Bw Hof · Bw Kirchenlaibach · Bw Lichtenfels · Bw Neuenmarkt-Wirsberg (since 1977 German Steam Locomotive Museum) · Bw Nürnberg West (ehemals Bw Nürnberg Hbf.) · Bw Nürnberg Rbf. · Bw Passau · Bw Plattling · Bw Pressig-Rothenkirchen · Bw Regensburg · Bw Schwandorf · Bw Schweinfurt · Bw Straubing · Bw Weiden · Bw Würzburg

== Magdeburg Division ==
Bw Aschersleben · Bw Bernburg · Bw Blankenburg (Harz) · Bw Burg (b. Magd) (Schmalspur-Bw) · Bw Eilsleben · Bw Güsten · Bw Halberstadt (2003) · Bw Haldensleben · Bw Jerichow · Bw Köthen · Bw Magdeburg Hbf · Bw Magdeburg-Buckau · Bw Magdeburg-Rothensee · Bw Oebisfelde · Bw Oschersleben · Bw Salzwedel · Bw Staßfurt · Bw Stendal · Bw Wernigerode (Schmalspur-Bw)

== Munich Division ==
Bw Augsburg · Bw Berchtesgaden (1966) · Bw Buchloe (1960) · Bw Freilassing · Bw Garmisch-Partenkirchen (1984) · Bw Ingolstadt · Bw Kempten · Bw Landshut (1984) · Bw Lindau (1983) · Bw Mühldorf · Bw München Hbf · Bw München-Ludwigsfeld (1953) · Bw München-Ost (1977) · Bw München-Steinhausen · Bw München-Thalkirchen (1952) · Bw Murnau (1950) · Bw Neu-Ulm (1961) · Bw Nördlingen (1983) · Bw Oberstdorf (1951) · Bw Rosenheim (1989) · Bw Schongau (1967) · Bw Simbach (1959) · Bw Treuchtlingen (1968)

== Oppeln Division ==
Bw Gleiwitz · Bw Beuthen · Bw Peiskretscham · Bw Groschowitz · Bw Oppeln · Bw Neiße · Bw Nieder-Lindewiese · Bw Jägerndorf · Bw Troppau · Bw Zauchtel

== Osten Division ==
Bw Küstrin-Neustadt · Bw Landsberg (Warthe) · Bw Meseritz · Bw Schneidemühl Pbf · Bw Schneidemühl Bbf · Bw Kreuz · Bw Arnswalde · Bw Neu Bentschen · Bw Glogau · Bw Grünberg

== Saarbrücken Division ==
Bw Cochem (1966) · Bw Dillingen (1973) · Bw Ehrang (1983) · Bw Gerolstein (1977) · Bw Hermeskeil (1955) · Bw Homburg (1967) · Bw Kaiserslautern · Bw Kirn (1966) · Bw Merzig (1957) · Bw Neunkirchen (1958) · Bw Saarbrücken Hbf · Bw Saarbrücken Vbf (1964) · Bw Simmern (1982) · Bw St. Wendel (1981) · Bw Trier · Bw Völklingen (1959) · Bw Zweibrücken (1962)

== Schwerin Division ==
Bw Angermünde · Bw Barth · Bw Eberswalde · Bw Friedland · Bw Güstrow · Bw Hagenow Land · Bw Heringsdorf · Bw Neubrandenburg · Bw Neuruppin · Bw Neustrelitz · Bw Parchim · Bw Pasewalk · Bw Prenzlau · Bw Rostock . Bw Rostock-Seehafen · Bw Saßnitz · Bw Schwerin · Bw Stralsund · Bw Wismar · Bw Wittenberge · Bw Wittstock (Dosse)

== Stuttgart Division ==
Bw Aalen (1976) · Bw Calw (1953) · Bw Crailsheim (1987) · Bw Freudenstadt (1977) · Bw Friedrichshafen (1982) · Bw Geislingen (1958) · Bw Heilbronn · Bw Horb (?) Bw Kornwestheim · Bw Lauda (1976) · Bw Mühlacker (1952) · Bw Plochingen · Bw Pforzheim (1978) · Bw Rottweil (1978) · Bw Stuttgart Rosensteinpark · Bw Stuttgart-Untertürkheim (1953) · Bw Tübingen · Bw Ulm

== Stettin Division ==
Bw Stettin Gbf · Bw Stettin Hbf · Bw Jädickendorf · Bw Swinemünde · Bw Stargard · Bw Belgard · Bw Kolberg · Bw Naugard · Bw Bad Polzin · Bw Pyritz · Bw Stolp · Bw Neustettin · Bw Lauenburg · Bw Bütow

== See also ==
- History of rail transport in Germany
- Bahnbetriebswerk
- Bahnbetriebswerk (steam locomotives)
- List of Deutsche Bahn locomotive depots
