= Hauzenberg =

- Town
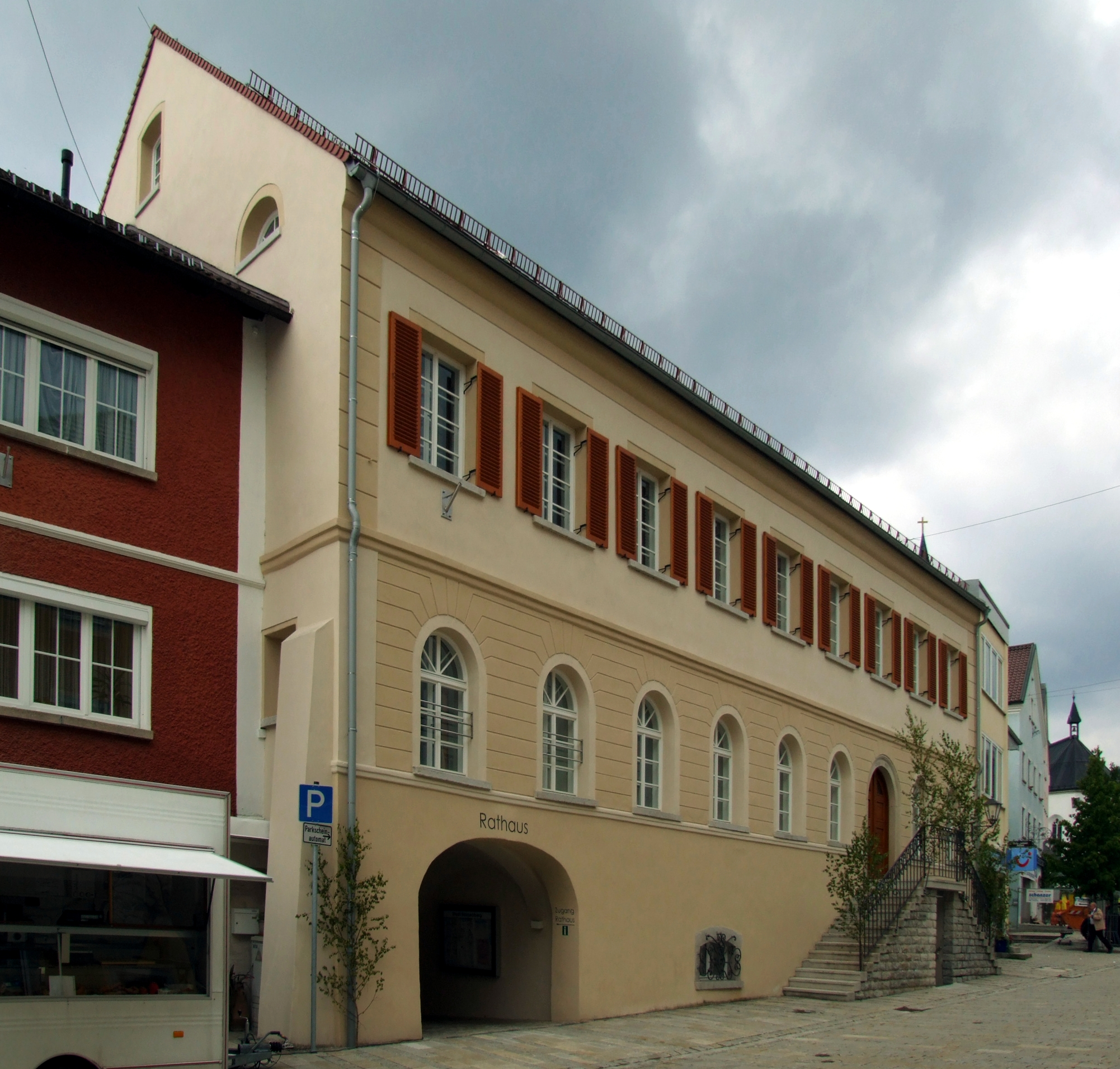
- Town hall in Hauzenberg

- Coat of arms

- Location of Hauzenberg within Passau district
- Interactive map of Hauzenberg
- Location within Germany Location within Bavaria
- Coordinates: 48°39′N 13°38′E
- Country: Germany
- State: Bavaria
- Admin. region: Niederbayern
- District: Passau

Government
  - Mayor (2020–26): Gudrun Donaubauer (Ind.)

Area
  - Total: 82.79 km^{2} (31.97 sq mi)
- Elevation: 546 m (1,791 ft)

Population (2025-12-31)
  - Total: 11,883
  - Density: 143.5/km^{2} (371.7/sq mi)
- Time zone: UTC+01:00 (CET)
  - Summer (DST): UTC+02:00 (CEST)
- Postal codes: 94051
- Dialling codes: 08586
- Vehicle registration: PA
- Website: www.hauzenberg.de

Hauzenberg (German pronunciation: [ˈhaʊtsn̩ˌbɛʁk]) is a municipality in the district of Passau, in Bavaria, Germany. It is situated 15 kilometres (9 miles) northeast of Passau.

In November 1936, Gauleiter Fritz Wächtler dedicated the Hauzenberg district house. In June 1940, the local National Socialists organized a slide show titled Weltpirat England and U-Boot auf Kaperfahrt. Party leader Heilmaier seized the opportunity to announce regulations about how to deal with Polish farm laborers and prisoners of war.

== Twin towns — sister cities ==
Hauzenberg is twinned with:

- Vöcklabruck, Austria
- Slovenj Gradec, Slovenia
- Český Krumlov, Czech Republic
