= Vilshofen–Aidenbach railway =

Railway line in Germany

Vilshofen−Aidenbach railway
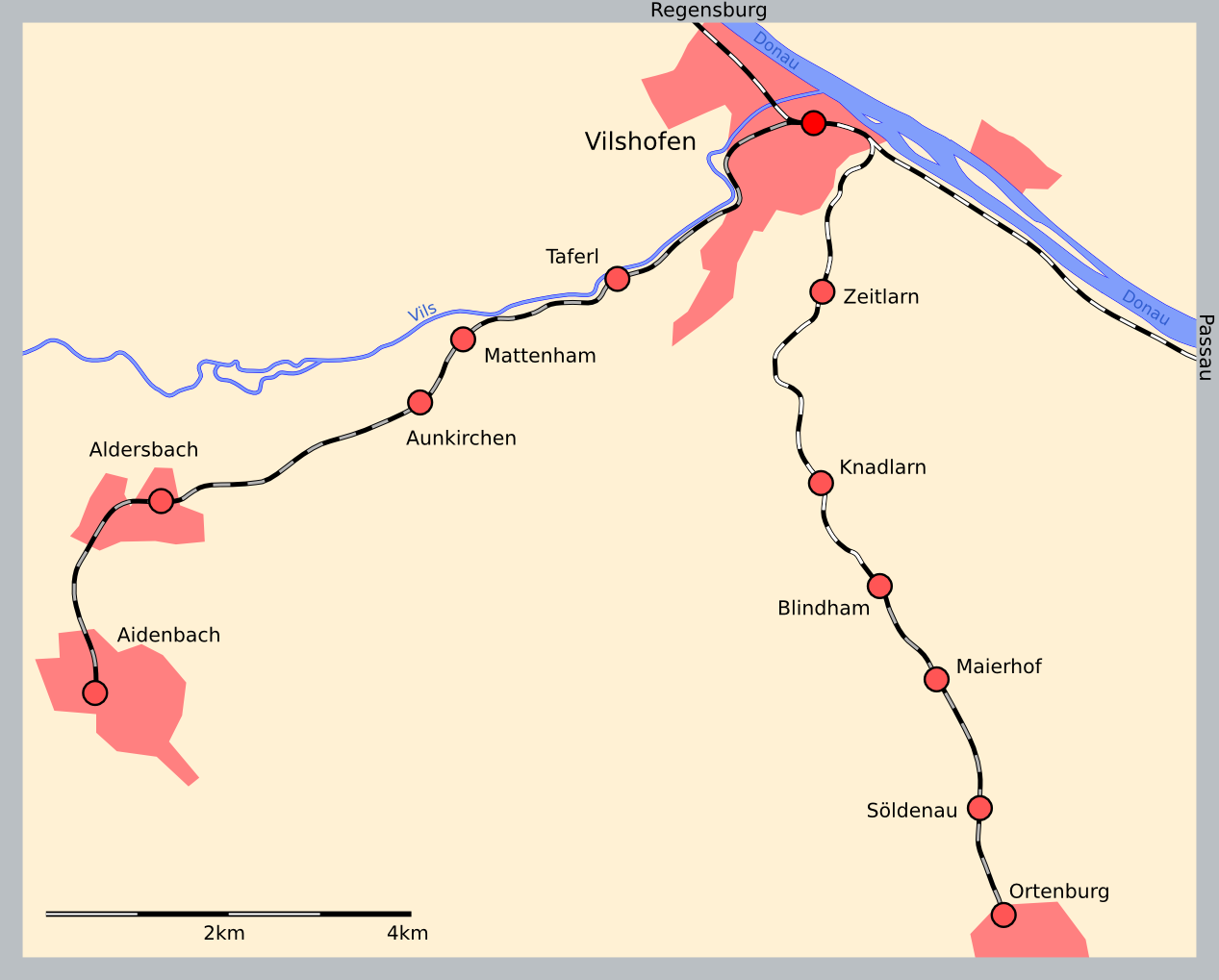

Technical
- Line length: 12.5 km (7.8 mi)
- Track gauge: 1,435 mm (4 ft 8 1/2 in)

The Vilshofen (Niederb)–Aidenbach railway was a German branch line in the state of Bavaria which opened on 21 November 1898. Passenger traffic ceased in 1962 and all services were withdrawn in 1988. The line was then dismantled.

== Planning and construction ==
Originally there were plans in which Aidenbach was seen as the crossing station on a line from Vilshofen via Aidenbach to Pfarrkirchen. The railway from Landau an der Isar to Kröhstorf was to be extended to Aidenbach. In that way a local railway network and diversionary route would have been achieved.

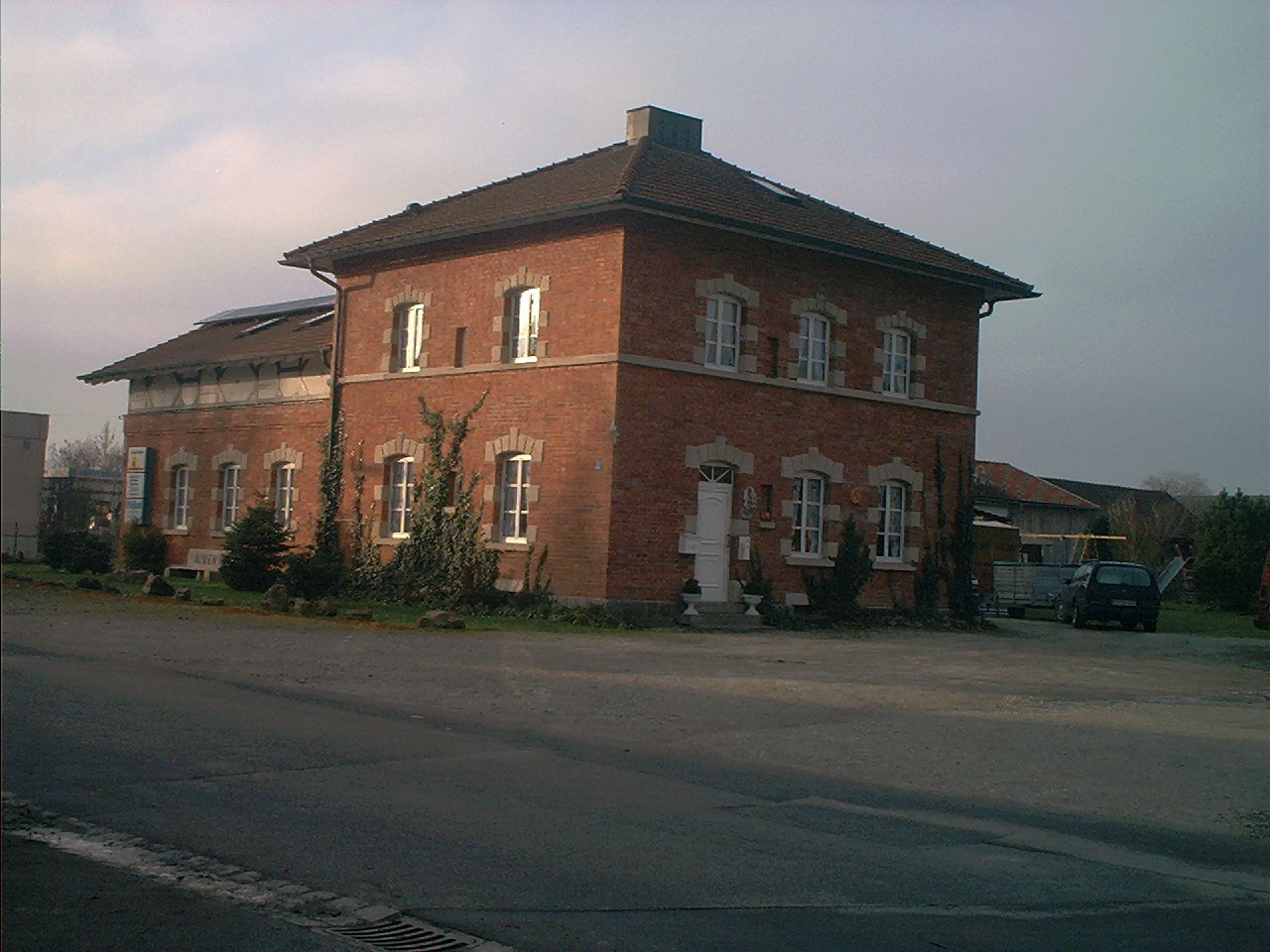
Aidenbach station in 2001

On 6 January 1883 a meeting took place in Aidenbach, which discussed the construction of a railway from Vilshofen via Aidenbach to Pfarrkirchen. This had been set up by the Gutsinspektor of the Aretin estates in Haidenburg, Baron von Hafenbrädl. Led by Reichsrat Aretin they decided, to send a petition to the Royal Bavarian State Government in Munich. On 29 February 1884 the railway committee responsible considered this Sekundärbahn ('secondary line'). However, according to a statement by the committee spokesman, Freiherr von Soden, a plan had already been agreed in 1869, in which this option had no place. On the contrary, the Rot Valley railway between Neumarkt-St. Veit and Pocking had been built in 1879; and the Pocking–Passau route was established in 1888.

On 17 May 1885 representatives of the local communities gathered in Aidenbach to form a committee for the construction of a Lokalbahn ('local line'). Their plan envisaged a stub line from Vilshofen to Aidenbach. Farmers and businessmen provided the incentive. They argued that they could transport their products more easily on the railway. Once again they submitted a resolution to the Royal Ministry of Transport in Munich for building this 12.5 kilometre long route and offered financial support. The county (Kreis), district and private investors put up 31,000 marks. In addition, Aidenbach said it was prepared to make land available for the line, and to provide 100,000 bricks free of charge for the construction of Aidenbach station.

On 16 March 1896, after planning had been completed, land purchased, the donated real estate from Aidenbach and Vilshofen acquired, profitability calculated and many other processes concluded, the Royal Bavarian State Railways in Munich gave permission for the construction of the line. The line was tested with a technical trial run by state railway management on 12 November 1898 and on 21 November 1898 it was opened for public services. The total cost of the line, including structures, came to 744,086 marks.

== Operations ==
Trains needed about 35 minutes to travel the 12.5 kilometres. The goods-only stop of Taferl at kilometre marker 4.0, with it extensive industrial railway system (Feldbahn), acted as a transhipment site for the adjacent granite works and was served daily by goods trains. The cost of the line had been covered within ten years.

== Closure ==
The growth of private transport in the second half of the 20th century led to a sharp decline in the numbers of passengers. The Deutsche Bundesbahn reacted by reducing services. In the 1960 summer timetable only one pair of trains ran daily on workdays. On 12 October 1961 the railway division responsible, the Bundesbahndirektion Regensburg, started moves for withdrawing passenger services; this was finally agreed by their management on 18 July 1962 and the Federal Transport Minister on 14 September 1962. As a result, passenger traffic ceased on 30 September 1962.

By contrast, the situation for goods traffic was initially much better. Admittedly, since the cessation of granite transportation, the trains carried little else but agricultural produce, but this was so much in demand, that the Deutsche Bundesbahn decided in 1985, to continue maintaining the track which, in places, was in very poor condition. In the first two kilometres alone, 700,000 DM were invested. However, no work was carried out on the second section, when the sugar beet firm cancelled its existing contract with the Bundesbahn. Because the transportation of sugar beet had amounted to over half the annual revenue, in spring 1987 steps were taken to close the line entirely. On 30 December 1987 the last train ran from Aidenbach to Vilshofen and on the 31 December 1987 the branch line was finally closed.

Today about half the former trackbed has been converted into a footpath and cycle way.

== See also ==
- Royal Bavarian State Railways
- Bavarian branch lines
- List of closed railway lines in Bavaria

== Sources ==
- Wolfgang Bleiweis: Die Lokalbahn Vilhofen-Aidenbach, Schweinfurt 1993, ISBN 3-928786-05-9
- Siegfried Bufe: Nebenbahnen im Passauer Land, 1998, ISBN 3-922138-66-7
- Ludwig Maier: Lokalbahn Vilshofen-Aidenbach, 1998
