= Bahnbetriebswerk =

Railway maintenance depot

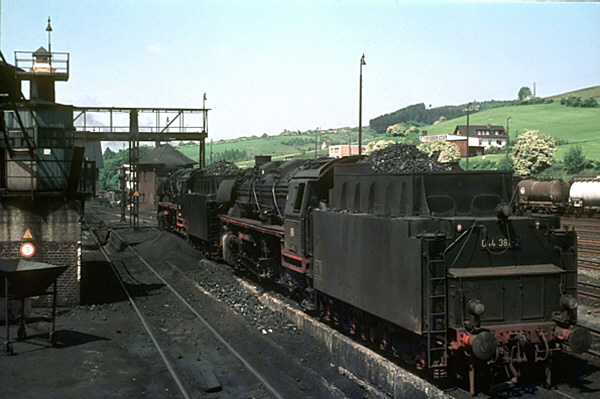
Locomotive facilities at Bahnbetriebswerk Ottbergen

A Bahnbetriebswerk is the equivalent of a locomotive depot (or motive power depot) on the German and Austrian railways. It is an installation that carries out the maintenance, minor repairs, refuelling and cleaning of locomotives and other motive power. In addition it organises the deployment of locomotives and crews. In the Deutsche Bahn, a Bahnbetriebswerk is known today as a Betriebshof; the ÖBB refer to it as a Zugförderungsstelle (Zf). Many other countries simply use the term 'depot'. The smaller facility, the Lokomotivstation (also Einsatzstelle or Lokbahnhof) akin to the British sub-depot or stabling point, is affiliated to a Bahnbetriebswerk.

N.B. The shortened form Betriebswerk is also used and both are commonly abbreviated to Bw or BW. The plural is Bahnbetriebswerke.

== History ==
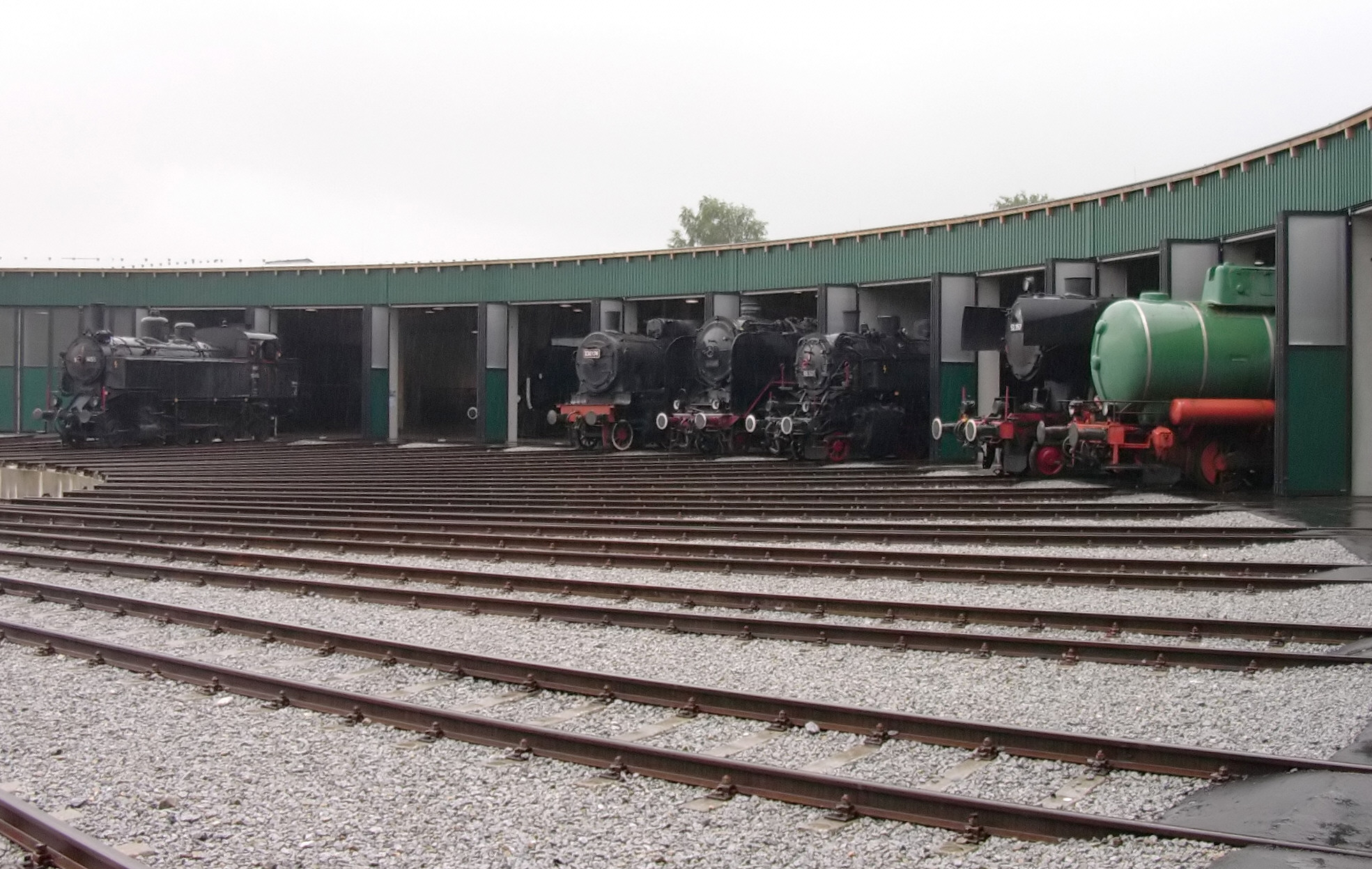
Roundhouse

=== Beginnings ===
On 7 January 1835 the first Bahnbetriebswerk in Germany was opened. It looked after locomotives on the first railway line in Germany, the Bavarian Ludwigsbahn from Nuremberg to Fürth. It was here that the first locomotive in Germany, the Adler, was assembled and maintained. The inventor or father of the Bahnbetriebswerk was John Blenkinsop. He was the first to recognise that smooth railway operations needed well-equipped workshops and suitable personnel and, as a result, was entrusted with the technical direction of the Brunswick State Railway. Soon afterwards the first Bahnbetriebswerk was built. Not only did it carry out the usual functions of such a depot, but also others such as the construction of locomotives. In 1845, John Blenkinsop made it clear that it was considerably cheaper to service locomotives at regular intervals than not to repair them until they broke down. He therefore laid the foundations for what subsequently became the routine tasks of a Bahnbetriebswerk, although it was several years before they were divided into Bahnbetriebswerke and Ausbesserungswerke or repair shops. Gradually all the other German railway companies organised their technical support based on the example of the Ludwigsbahn and Brunswick State Railway.

Because the radius of action of the first steam locomotives was only about 80 km, facilities were installed at all larger stations for the maintenance of locomotives; in particular coal and water supplies had to be replenished. Such facilities also appeared at junctions, which explains why there were so many locomotive sheds of that type.

=== Länderbahn period ===
From the 1860s, all railway companies separated the functions of traffic operating (working the locomotives) and mechanical engineering. Over time, the first repair shops (Ausbesserungswerke) also appeared, known at that time as Hauptwerkstätten (main workshops). On the creation of the German Empire the system described above was adopted by everyone and, in addition, many private railways were nationalised with the result that this approach was eventually followed by those too.

=== Deutsche Reichsbahn 1920–1945 ===
With the takeover of the German state railways (the Länderbahnen) following the state treaty of 30 April 1920 the organisation of engineering services was standardised across the whole of Germany. The Deutsche Reichsbahn (DR) set up various Reichsbahn divisions (Reichsbahndirektionen) and engineering offices (Maschinenämter). On 1 August 1935 there were 7 Reichsbahn divisions and 132 engineering offices.

The new organisational regulations introduced in the 1920s proved their worth, nevertheless the number of Bahnbetriebswerke rose and fell significantly. Initially the DR turned large Lokbahnhöfe into Bahnbetriebswerke, but on the foundation of the Deutsche Reichsbahn-Gesellschaft things changed suddenly. A fifth of the reparations that had to be handed to the victorious powers after World War I had to be absorbed by the DRG. In order to be able to manage that, rationalisation measures had to be taken; above all almost all areas had to make savings. In addition the management was streamlined which led to the closure of all smaller Bahnbetriebswerke. At the same time so-called Großbahnbetriebswerke (large locomotive depots) were created. Medium and small facilities were often integrated into these Betriebswerke. As a result, giant depots emerged that had a multitude of maintenance facilities. Examples include: Dresden-Friedrichstadt, Hamburg-Altona, Hamm and Osnabrück. They were often responsible for the maintenance of over 150 locomotives.

=== Deutsche Bundesbahn 1945–1993 ===
The Deutsche Bundesbahn began from 1950 to turn smaller Bahnbetriebswerke into outstations. This development was accelerated by the changeover in traction, because considerably fewer personnel were needed for diesel and electric locomotives. And the reduction in passenger and goods traffic rendered some of the Bahnbetriebswerk capacity superfluous. From 1956 to 1969 the Deutsche Bundesbahn closed a total of 77 Bahnbetriebswerke. The end of the steam era in the DB led to further closures.

=== Deutsche Reichsbahn 1945–1993 ===
Initially the Deutsche Reichsbahn in East Germany went in the other direction. Many smaller stabling points (Lokbahnhöfe) were promoted to Bahnbetriebswerke, primarily in order to ensure better maintenance of the locomotives on the spot. Not until the start of the changeover in traction in the mid-1960s did the DR begin to follow a similar pattern to the DB. Smaller Bahnbetriebswerke were now closed, but most remained in service as locomotive stables. For diesel and electric locomotive servicing the DR generally made do with existing facilities; the construction of new, modern installations was only carried out in a few cases.

=== Deutsche Bahn AG since 1994 ===
With the reform of the railways and the formation of Deutsche Bahn the century-old operating concepts were completely changed - the unity of operations and maintenance was given up. These two functions were taken over by the business areas of traction and works. The Betriebswerke were renamed Betriebshöfe, each under its own manager. With this new structure the works now just became suppliers of maintenance jobs that were allocated to them from the traction business area. This totally new arrangement started a wave of rationalisations in Deutsche Bahn that led to the closure of works and Betriebshöfen. In the former Deutsche Reichsbahn's area (i.e. eastern Germany) even the large Bahnbetriebswerke were shut. In order to deploy new motive units, such as the ICE, Betriebshöfe had to be enlarged in order to be able to service the new vehicles.

== Tasks ==
Bahnbetriebswerke are responsible for carrying out routine maintenance and minor repairs on locomotives in service. The allocation of crews to train services is also planned and executed in a Bahnbetriebswerk. At specified intervals (usually once or twice a week), all the components of a locomotive are inspected and tested by the 'inspecting mechanics' (Nachschauschlosser). Larger Bahnbetriebswerke with more comprehensive equipment also carry out big repairs themselves, such as the replacement of engines or the profile milling of wheelsets using below ground wheelset turning equipment.

=== Steam era ===
The largest amount of work was that which once had to be carried out in order to maintain steam locomotives. In addition to the replenishment of operating supplies - water, coal and braking sand - the cinders had to be emptied from the grate and smokebox daily. Even the oiling of all the bearings was part of the daily schedule of work for a steam locomotive. It was also important to turn tender locomotives in the planned direction of travel. One of the most important maintenance jobs in the Bw that was part of the laid-down routine was the washing out of the boiler.

=== Diesel and electric locomotives ===
With the changeover of traction from steam to diesel and electric locomotives, a comprehensive reorganisation of Bahnbetriebswerke was necessary. Sites that were only needed for the maintenance of steam locomotives no longer had any significance. And whilst for the servicing of electric locomotives, hardly any special installations were necessary apart from the erection of catenary in the Bw, the most important measure for the stabling of diesel locomotives was the installation of refuelling equipment.

By comparison the amount of work needed to service electric locomotives is quite small, and is mainly restricted to replenishing the brake sand containers, greasing the relatively few grease points and functional testing – especially of the train safety (PZB) equipment.

The same tasks have to be carried out on diesel locomotives as well. In addition, at regular intervals, the motors and drives have to serviced, including the changing of oil and various filters. Present-day Bws have to therefore have the right equipment for oil changes.

== Present-day ==
Modern diesel and electric locomotives need very little maintenance thanks to a large number of maintenance-light and non-wearing components. For that reason there are only a few Bahnbetriebswerke today compared with those in the steam era and they often concentrated on the maintenance and repair of an entire locomotive class.

In the Deutsche Bahn today's Bahnbetriebswerke, called Betriebshöfe, are increasingly independent and divided up between several DB AG business areas. In the ÖBB the Technische Services division is responsible for them. In the majority of Betriebshöfe, jobs are also carried out for other companies, for example, the maintenance of private railway stock. This is because the private railway operators cannot afford to build their own depots and so the task of maintaining locomotives is often handed over to the Betriebshöfe of the national railways.

The Betriebshöfe are restricted areas that are usually not open to the public. The work is not just carried out during the day, but predominantly at night, when large numbers of locomotives are not needed for traction duties. ICEs or other multiple units are also stored in the Betriebshöfe, which is not accessible and therefore there is no graffiti problem, as is often the case when unprotected goods wagons are stored in the open.

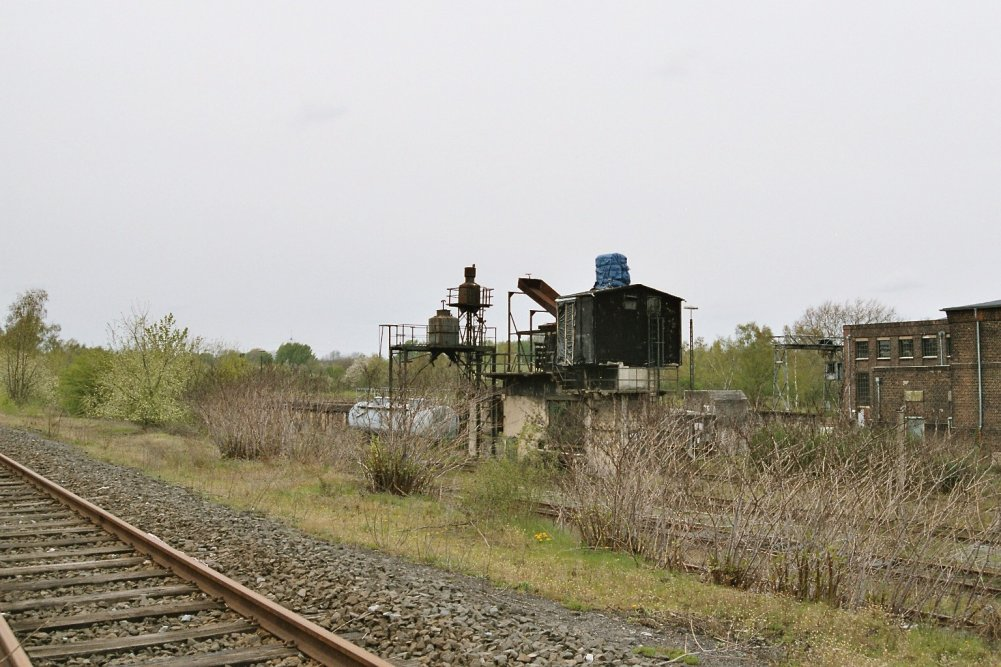
Closed Bw

At Betriebshöfe which still have buildings from the steam era, there are often problems in extending them. Buildings that are under heritage protection may not be torn down. Otherwise Betriebshöfe are basically laid out so that they can be extended in any direction. Even in the planning stages, consideration must be given to ensuring there is enough additional real estate that can be bought without difficulty if it is later decided to extend the facility.

Former Betriebswerke are often no longer used and completely overgrown. Often the trackage is totally removed and only the buildings under historical protection remain. There is however a project in Germany to turn a former Bahnbetriebswerk into the largest railway experience world in the country. This involves restoring all the ramshackle buildings to their original state once again.

== Special purpose trains ==
As well as the maintenance of locomotives, several Bahnbetriebswerke are also responsible for looking after special trains - even the changeover of traction has not changed that. The most important units are emergency trains (to re-rail rolling stock that has derailed) and snow clearance equipment. Up to the 1980s there were also fire trains, whose function has since been subsumed by the railway fire services. For the smooth operation of a Bahnbetriebswerk, shunters are also needed to move wagons, coaches and locomotives that cannot move under their own power. Up to 20 years ago there were other special trains, such as used oil trains, that have since all been retired.

== Road vehicle maintenance ==
The first Deutsche Reichsbahn buses and lorries entered service in 1933. The maintenance and repair of these vehicles was entrusted to newly created vehicle depots, the Kraftwagenbetriebswerke (KBW, KBw), which were often attached to existing Bahnbetriebswerke.

=== Deutsche Bundesbahn ===
Until the privatisation and reorganisation of the bus services in the Deutsche Bundesbahn in 1990, they also had Kraftwagenbetriebswerke (KBW). Amongst other things they handled the engineering aspects of bus services, i.e. the allocation of crews and vehicles, servicing and repairs. In addition other DB road vehicles were maintained, for example the lorries of the DB's own long-distance haulage fleet and the heavy transporters with Culemeyer trailers and tractors. The DB heavy transport group (Straße-Schiene i.e. 'road-rail') was however based in Hagen. The general inspections were carried out by DB staff. Kraftwagenbetriebswerke were even attached to some of the DB's own driving schools. Smaller facilities, the K-Gruppe were attached to Bahnbetriebswerke (e.g. in Hamelin). Locations with Kraftwagenbetriebswerke included Hanover, Hamburg, Bremen, Brunswick and Kassel.

=== Deutsche Reichsbahn ===
There were even Kraftwagenbetriebswerke (Kbw) in the Deutsche Reichsbahn in the GDR that were responsible for the servicing and repair of all railway works vehicles. These included a few buses and lorries to supplement rail services, but were mainly internal fault-clearing, delivery, supply or specialised works vehicles.

=== Deutsche Bahn ===
In 1993 the maintenance and distribution of vehicles was changed. The remaining fleet was transferred to the new business area known as the DB-Fuhrparkservice.

== See also ==
- List of locomotive depots in Germany
- Ausbesserungswerk
- Bahnbetriebswerk (steam locomotives)
- Motive power depot
- Roundhouse

== Literature ==
- Reiners, Jan (2006). So funktioniert das Bahnbetriebswerk (in German). transpress Verlag. ISBN 3-613-71279-2.
- Weikelt, Walter; Teufel, Manfred (2005). Die Technologie der Ausbesserung der Dampflokomotiven (in German). transpress Verlag. ISBN 3-613-71256-3.
- Tiedtke, Markus. Bahnbetriebswerke Teil 1, Bekohlung und Besandung (in German). Vol. EK-Special 19. Freiburg: EK-Verlag GmbH.
- Tiedtke, Markus. Bahnbetriebswerke Teil 2, Wasser marsch (in German). Vol. EK-Special 24. Freiburg: EK-Verlag GmbH.
- Tiedtke, Markus. Bahnbetriebswerke Teil 3, Drehscheiben und Lokschuppen (in German). Vol. EK-Special 34. Freiburg: EK-Verlag GmbH.
- Großkopf, Volker; Rohde, Dirk; Tiedtke, Markus (2001). Bahnbetriebswerke Teil 1, Kleine Lokstationen (in German). Vol. Eisenbahn-Journal Anlagenplanung 2/2001. Fürstenfeldbruck: Verlagsgruppe-Bahn GmbH. ISBN 3-89610-073-4.
- Großkopf, Volker; Rohde, Dirk; Tiedtke, Markus (2002). Bahnbetriebswerke Teil 2, Mittelgroße Lokstationen (in German). Vol. Eisenbahn-Journal Anlagenplanung 4/2002. Fürstenfeldbruck: Verlagsgruppe-Bahn GmbH. ISBN 3-89610-102-1.
- Rohde, Dirk; Tiedtke, Markus (2003). Bahnbetriebswerke Teil 3, Große Lokstationen (in German). Vol. Eisenbahn-Journal Anlagenplanung 4/2003. Fürstenfeldbruck: Verlagsgruppe-Bahn GmbH. ISBN 3-89610-116-1.
- Rohde, Dirk; Tiedtke, Markus (2004). Bahnbetriebswerke Teil 4, Groß-Bw (in German). Vol. Eisenbahn-Journal Anlagenplanung 4/2004. Fürstenfeldbruck: Verlagsgruppe-Bahn GmbH. ISBN 3-89610-129-3.
