= Lower Bavarian Open-Air Museums =

Museum in Germany

Coordinates: 48°56′6.0000″N 13°33′47.002″E

- Niederbayerische Freilichtmuseen Massing und Finsterau
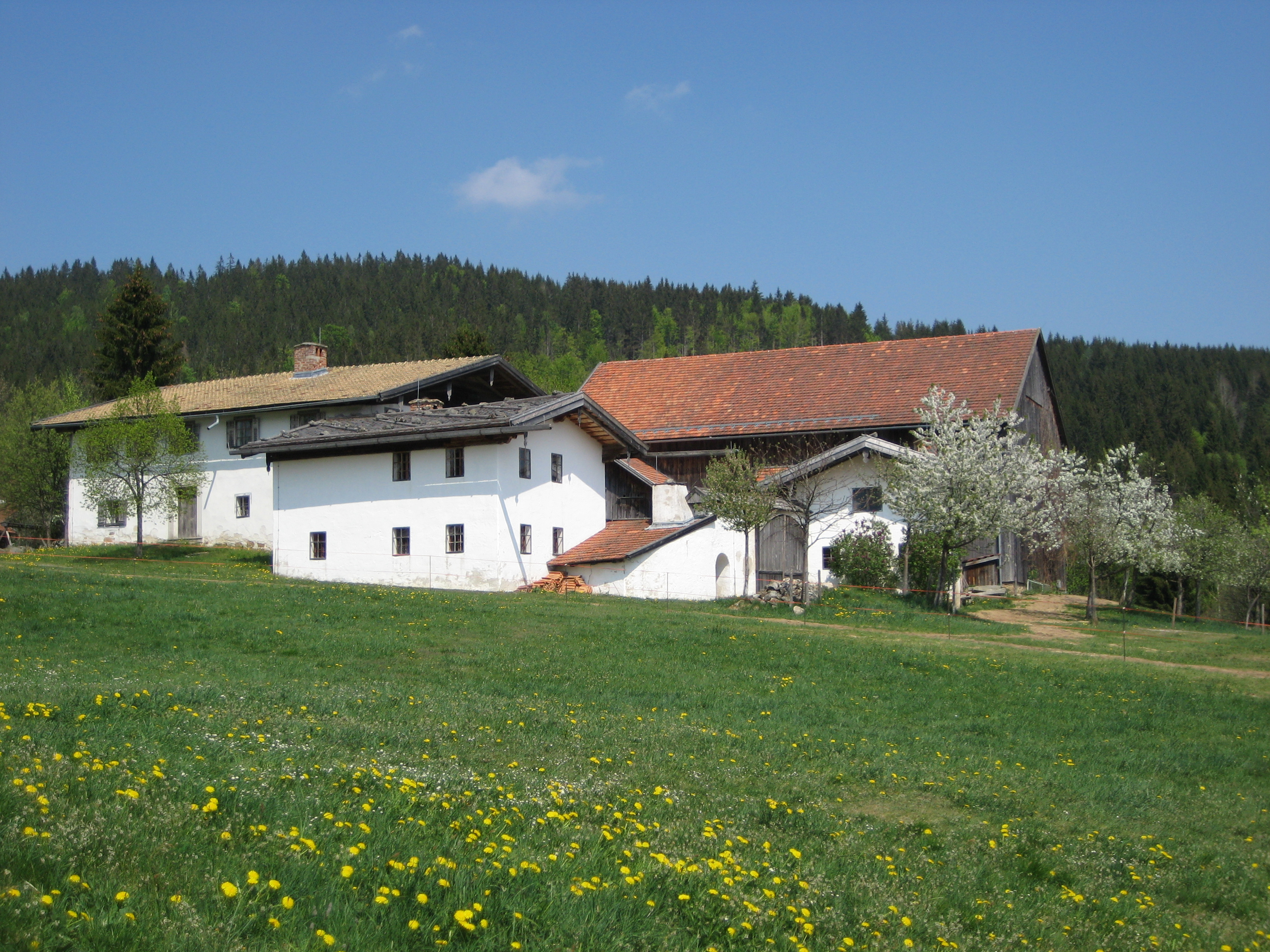
- The Petzihof in the open-air museum
- Location: Massing and Mauth, Bavaria, Germany
- Type: Open-air museums
- Collection size: Old ways of life, domestic, and agricultural activities
- Founder: Communal special purpose association
- Curator: Academic leadership
- Website: Official website

The Lower Bavarian Open-Air Museums (German: Niederbayerische Freilichtmuseen Massing und Finsterau) in Massing and Mauth has the objective of portraying the old ways of life and domestic and agricultural activities of the farming population of Lower Bavaria. It is owned by a communal special purpose association formed by the province of Lower Bavaria, the counties of Rottal-Inn and Freyung-Grafenau, and the municipalities of Massing and Mauth. The museums are under academic leadership.

== Finsterau Open-Air Museum ==
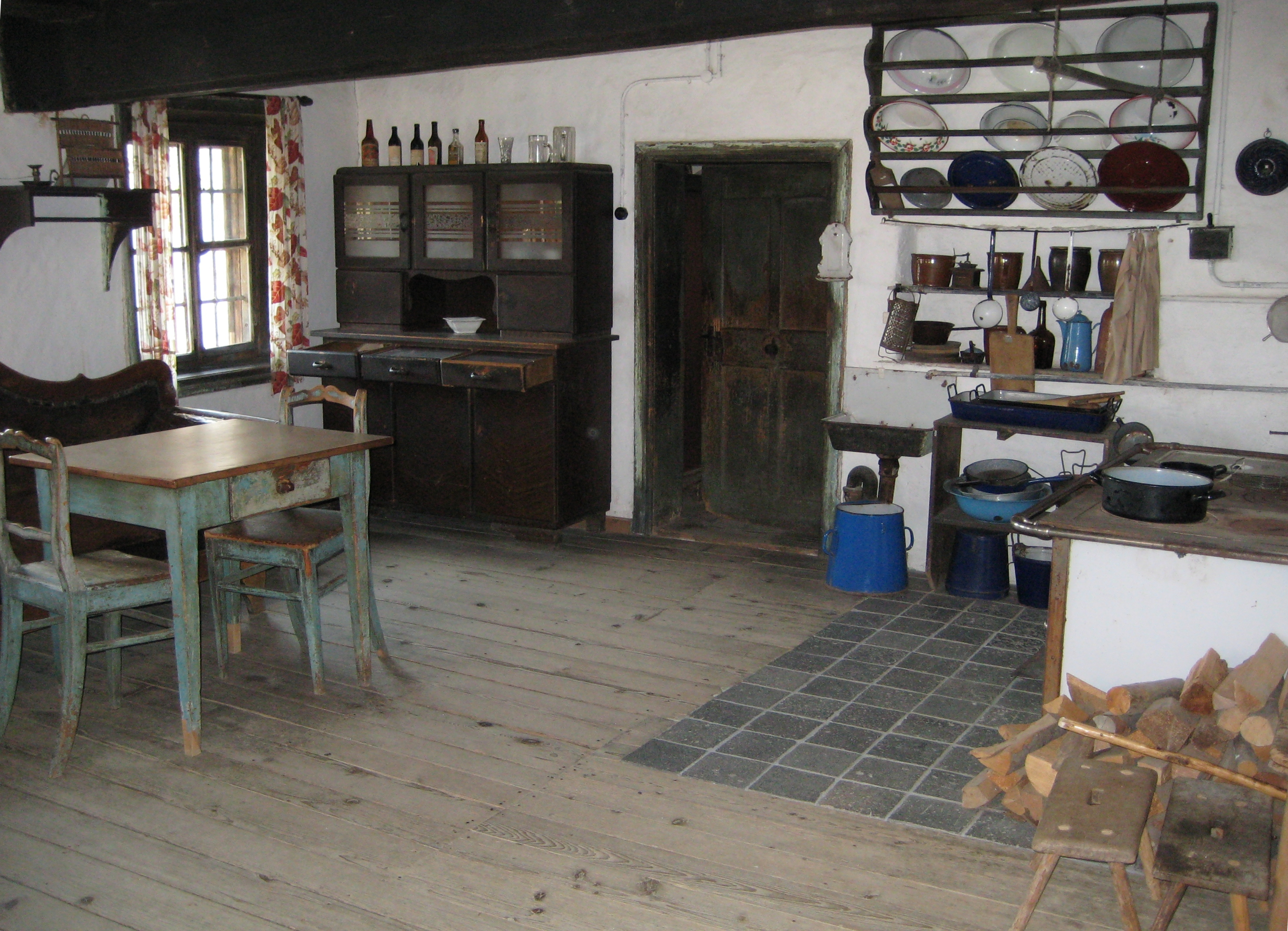
Living room of the Petzihof

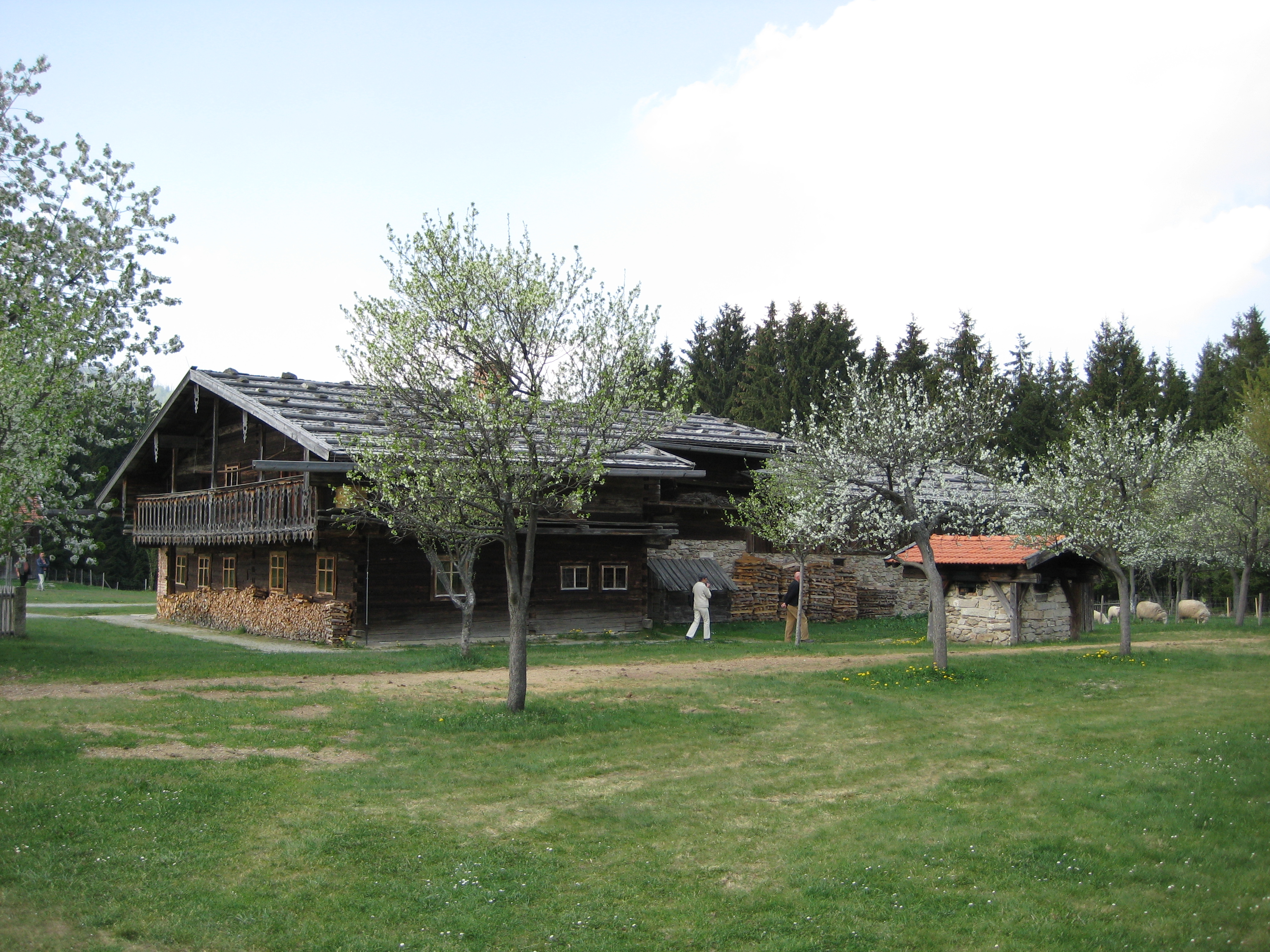
The Kapplhof

The Finsterau Open-Air Museum lies in the municipality of Mauth at the edge of the village of Finsterau in the Bavarian Forest near the Czech border. It has farmhouses, complete farmsteads, a village smithy and a roadside inn from across the Bavarian Forest. The everyday life of farmers and day labourers in this region was hard. In the Finsterau Open-Air Museum, everyday things, like tools or woven cloth, are displayed in their original context. Festivals, markets and special exhibitions are hosted in which the craftsmen and women demonstrate their handiwork. In the Ehrn, the old roadside inn from Kirchaitnach, the museum visitors may eat and drink.

=== Farms ===
- Kapplhof: The museum opened in 1980 with the Kapplhof. The house and farmyard were changed, repaired, and extended several times. It preserves the design of the Waldlerhaus type of farmhouse as it emerged in the 17th and 18th centuries in the small villages and hamlets of the inner Bavarian Forest. The living quarters and cattle shed are united under a gently pitched gable roof covered in shakes, the carefully divided grain barn is covered by a similar roof and even the livestock shed is built in a similar fashion.
- Tanzer-Hof: The Tanzer-Hof existed for barely 100 years. 31 tagwerks of wood, meadow and fields, and an undeveloped farmyard in the Angerdorf of Einberg were taken in 1879 for Michael Tanzer from the large farm of his brother. But it was too little: the colourful façade and the artistic decoration of the bedchamber could not compensate for the fact that the real estate for a farm was insufficient.
- Sachl: The occupants of the Sachl from Rumpenstadl never thrived. The arable fields were too poor, the meadows too small and there was no woodland. That is why the old wooden house is so austerely built. The livestock shed and cellar are small, the living room, kitchen, and chamber are narrow, the furniture is old and worn out.
- Petzi-Hof: Never before has a farm of this size with all its buildings been transported to an open-air museum in its entirety. The Petzi-Hof from Pötzerreut consists of a large residential and storage house (Wohnspeicherhaus), Inhaus, Austragshaus and baking oven, cowshed (Kuhstall), oxen shed (Ochsenstall) and grain store (Stadel). The 1704 farmhouse is the oldest, the 1927 Stadel is the most recent building. Woods and large, fertile fields made the Petzi-Hof into a wealthy property. Despite that, the furnishing of the living rooms and bedrooms is modest. The centrepiece of each living room is the bricked stove.
- Schanzer-Häusl: Opened in late 2007, the Schanzer-Häusl from Riedelsbach in the Bavarian Forest is a real Bohemian Forest house. This type of house occurred both in the inner Bavarian Forest as well as the inner Bohemian Forest. The house was built between 1826 and 1840 and was occupied until 1963. The characteristic feature of this house type is the large hipped roof, covered in shakes, which reaches to the ground floor, and covers a living area built from logs and livestock sheds mostly made from natural rocks. Living rooms, cattle shed and grain store is united under one roof.

== Massing Open-Air Museum ==
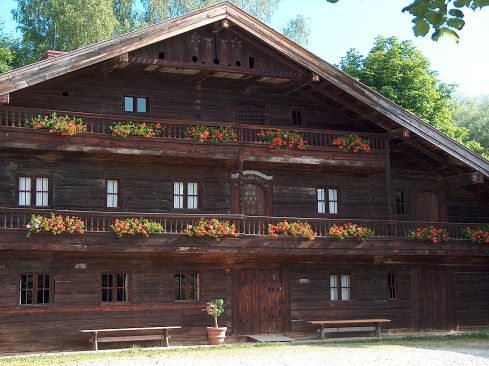
Schusteröderhof

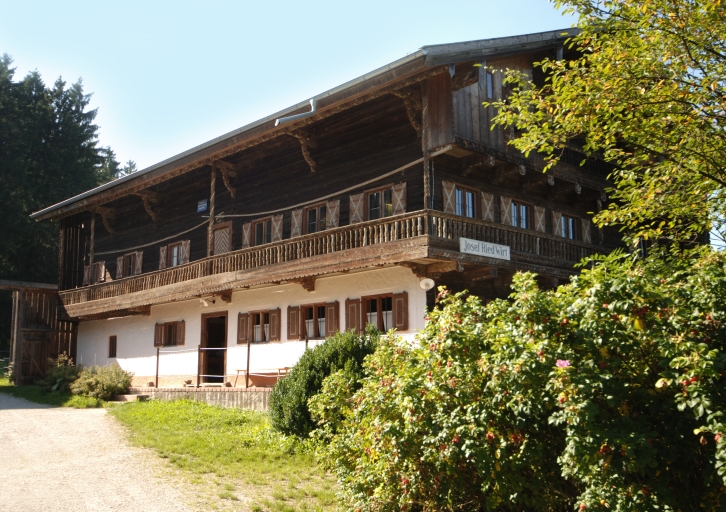
Heilmeierhof

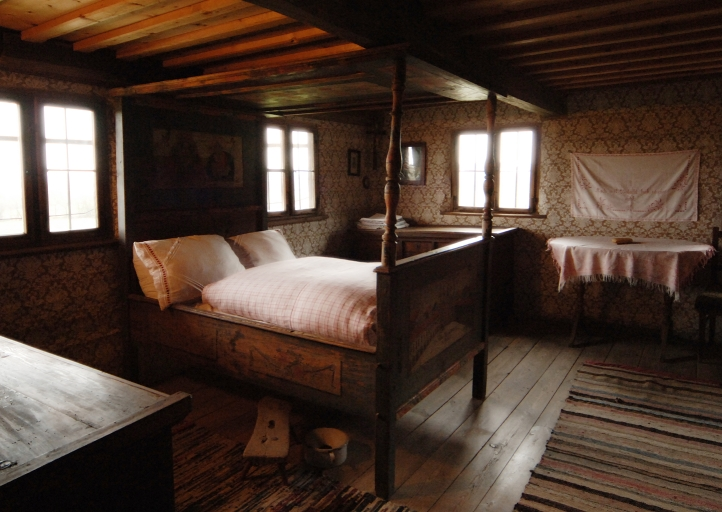
Bedchamber in the Marxensölde

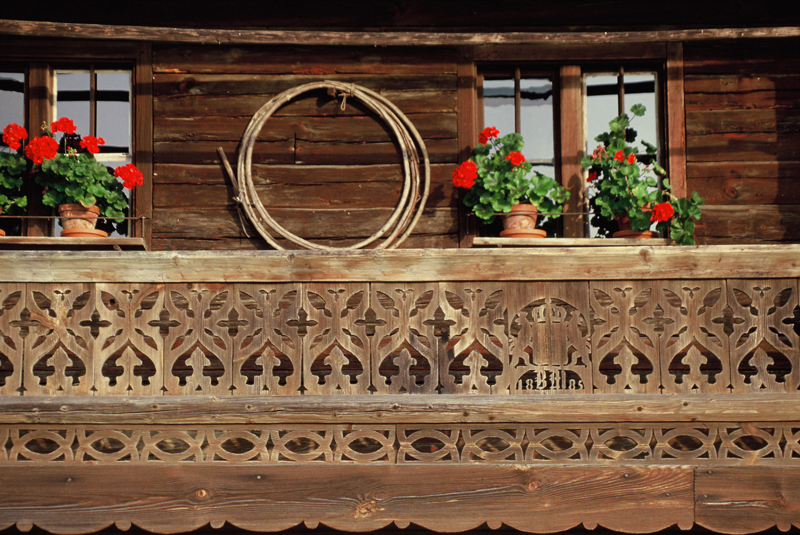
Balcony of the Marxensölde dating to 1885

The Massing Open-Air Museum was founded in 1969 and was one of the first museums of its type in Bavaria. Initially only the most attractive buildings from the rural Rot valley were displayed, which included wooden houses, painted cupboards and chests, Kröning pottery, embroidery, and turned ware. Since then, more everyday objects have been presented. With the Marxensölde farm came the world of the small farmers, with the Kochhof the fascination of technology: winch wells, tractors, vaulted stables, enamelled pots, bowls, and buckets. Orchards, field boundaries, hedges and avenues have been created. The Spring Market (Lenzmarkt), Solstice Festival (Sonnwendfest), Harvest Beer Festival (Arntbierfest), and Museumskirta are highlights of the museum year.

=== Farms ===
Between the rivers, Rott and Inn lay the home of the Kochhof, the Heilmeierhof came from a village on the edge of the broad Isar valley, the Lehnerhof stood in the middle of the hop gardens of the Hallertau and the farmhouse of the Schusteröderhof had its original location not far from Massing.

- Schusteröderhof: the Schusteröderhof, with which the museum in Massing started, remains in the condition it was acquired in 1969. To its furnishings belong items of farming life in the Rott valley, like its double balcony with its turned balusters and the Arma Christi cross on the barn (Stadel).
- Kochhof: the centrepiece of the museum is the Kochhof. Peacocks, chickens, pigs, cats, a flock of doves, and often, cattle are at home here. Everything on this farm is in its places as it was around 1930. The entirely wooden farmhouse with its two balconies is a typical "Rott valley farmhouse". The two-floor (zweitennige) Bundwerk barn with the year 1836 painted on it indicates the wealth of the Kochhof farmer.
- Freilinger Häusl: The Freilinger Häusl is presented as a 'bare' architectural monument. Its fate was that it stood empty most of the time or was used as a shed. As a result, this farmhouse, which is one of the oldest in Lower Bavaria, has survived. The log farmhouse, balcony (Schrot), and shingled roof (Legschindeldach) have characterised the external appearance of Lower Bavarian farmhouses for centuries.
- Marxensölde : the unit farmhouse (Wohnstallhaus) of the Marxensölde is dated to 1887 in its balcony boards. Everything that belonged to a small farm is gathered here under one roof.
- Lehnerhof: from the Hallertau comes to the Lehnerhof. Its owner lived by farming hops, pig mast, and dairy cattle.

== Literature ==
- Martin Ortmeier: Die Bauernhäuser und ihre Geschichte. Dietmar Klinger Verlag, Passau, 2009, ISBN 978-3-932949-87-6
- Martin Ortmeier: Ein Bauernhofmuseum für Niederbayern - Freilichtmuseum Massing. Zweckverband Niederbayerische Freilichtmuseen, Landshut, 2001, ISBN 3-9805663-4-X
- Martin Ortmeier: Die schönsten Bauernhäuser des Rottals. SüdOst Verlag, Waldkirchen, 2002, ISBN 3-89682-073-7
- Helmut Gebhard: Bauernhäuser in Bayern - Niederbayern. Hugendubel, Munich, 1995, ISBN 3-88034-817-0

== Award ==
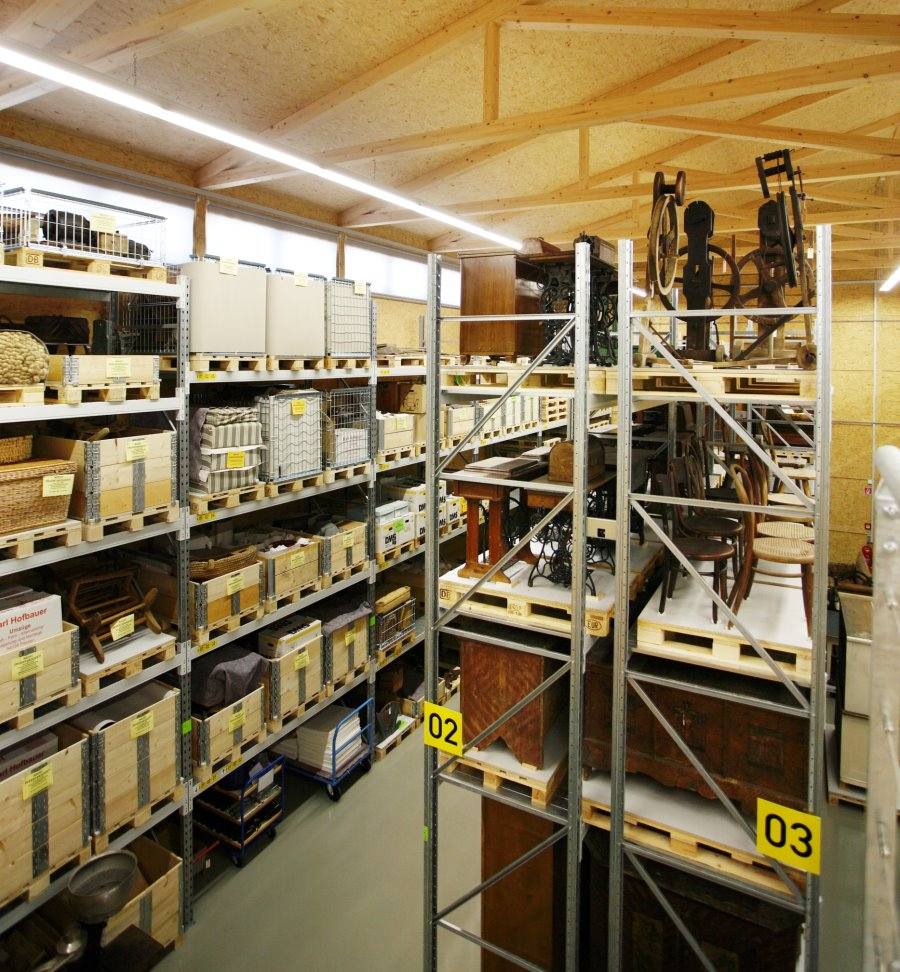
Store room at the Massing Open-Air Museum

In 2007 the Massing Open-Air Museum received a special award of the Bavarian Museum Prize for the conception and redesign of its museum depot for its collection and its exemplary operation.

== See also ==
- List of European open-air museums
