= Waldlerhaus =

Form of agricultural building in Germany

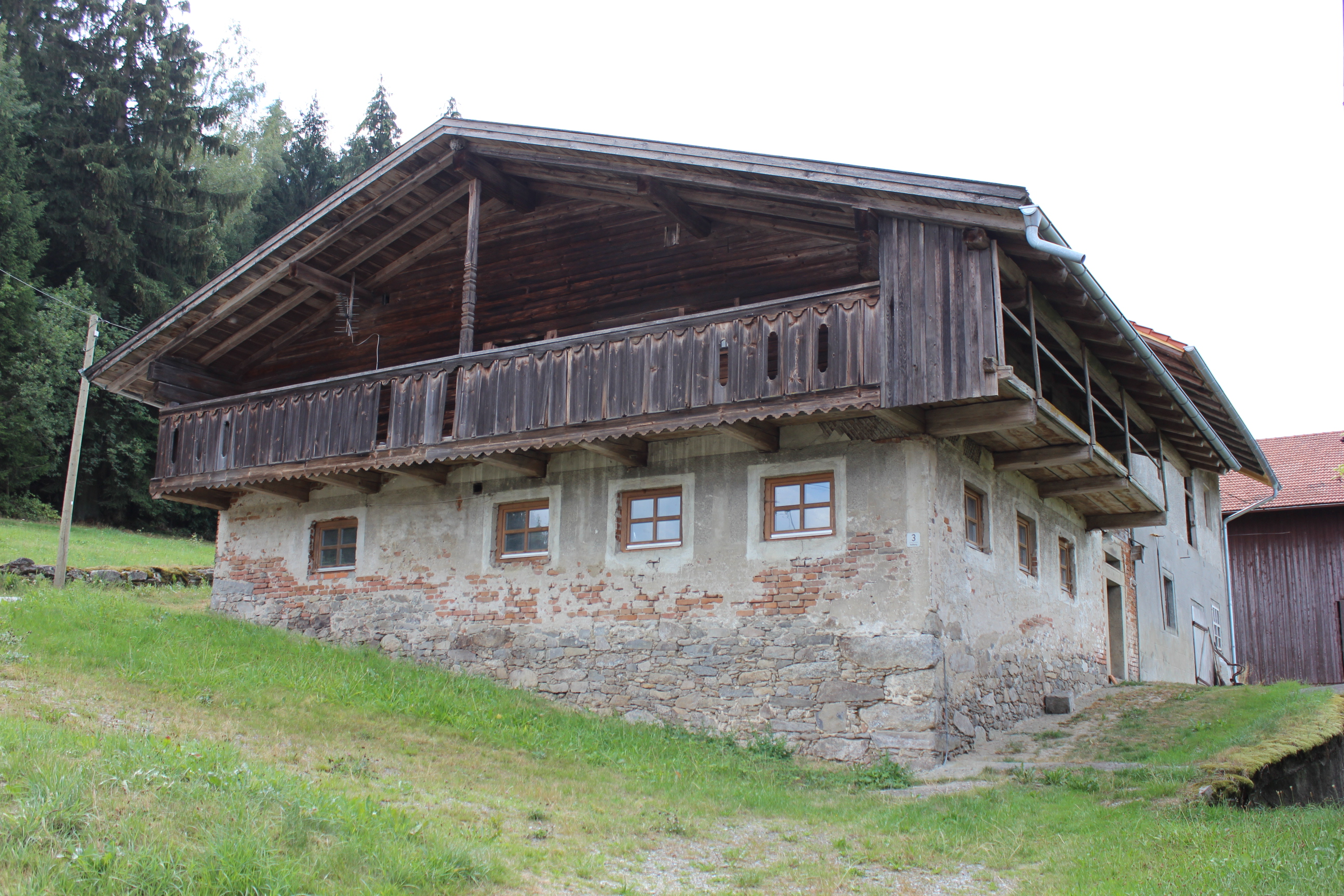
A Waldlerhaus in Kellburg of typical construction with partially covered balcony

The Waldlerhaus is a local form of agricultural building, typical of the Bavarian Forest and Upper Palatine Forest in Germany. The term Waldlerhaus goes back to the 19th century and describes the house of a person who lives in and from the forest.

Its distribution area is bounded by the edges of the Bavarian and Upper Palatine Forests. The boundary of the associated cultural-historical region has been complicated by recent history. Until the Second World War the area of the lower Bavarian Forest, the Mühlviertel in Austria and the southern Bohemian Forest in present-day Czech Republic, formed one large unit. This means there is also a difficulty in determining its boundary with the Bohemian Forest house (Böhmerwaldhaus), which occurs in the Czech Republic and in the "Šumava", the Czech part of the Bohemian Forest.

== Description ==
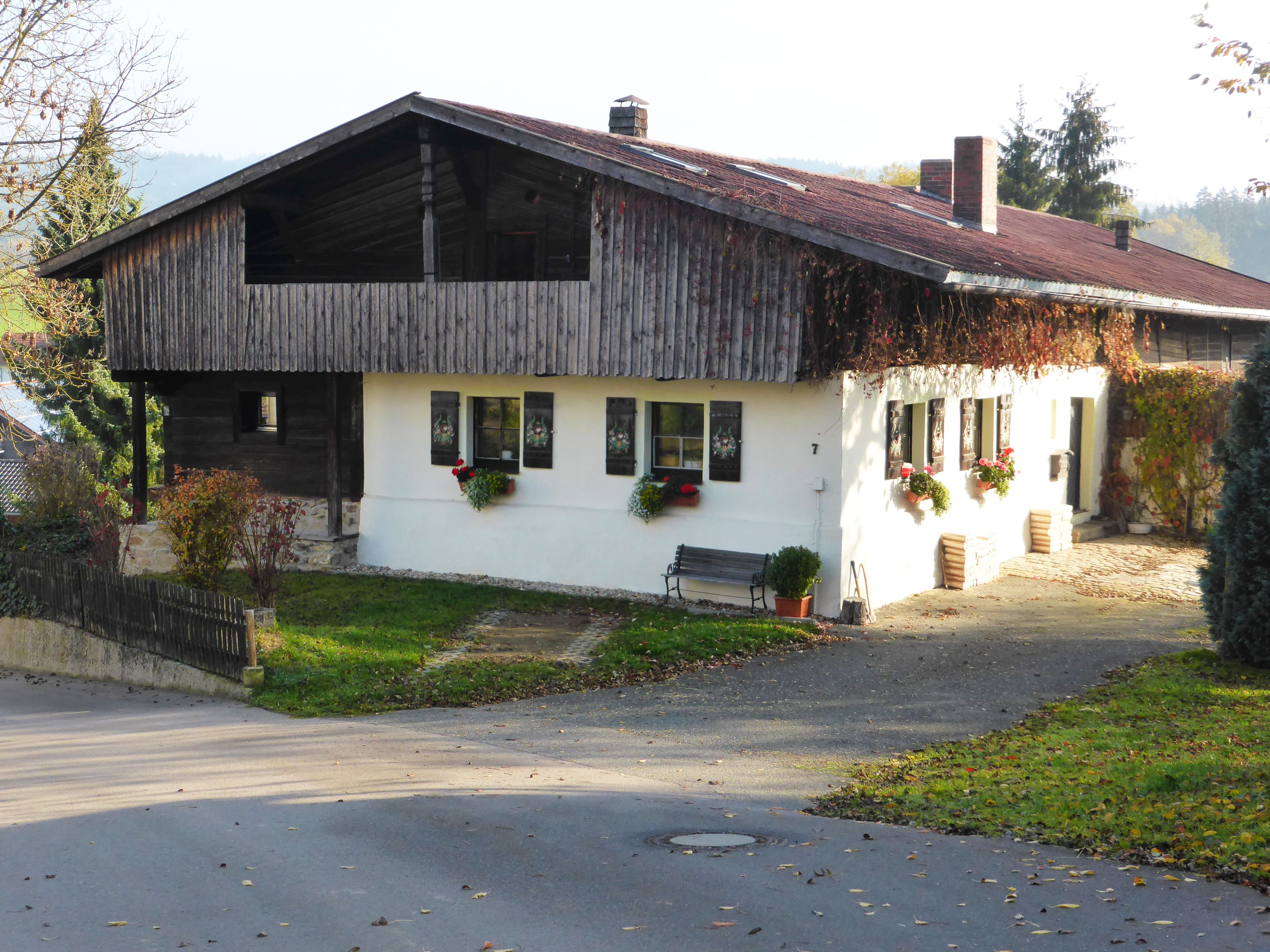
The wood-panelled upper storey and roof balcony is a typical element

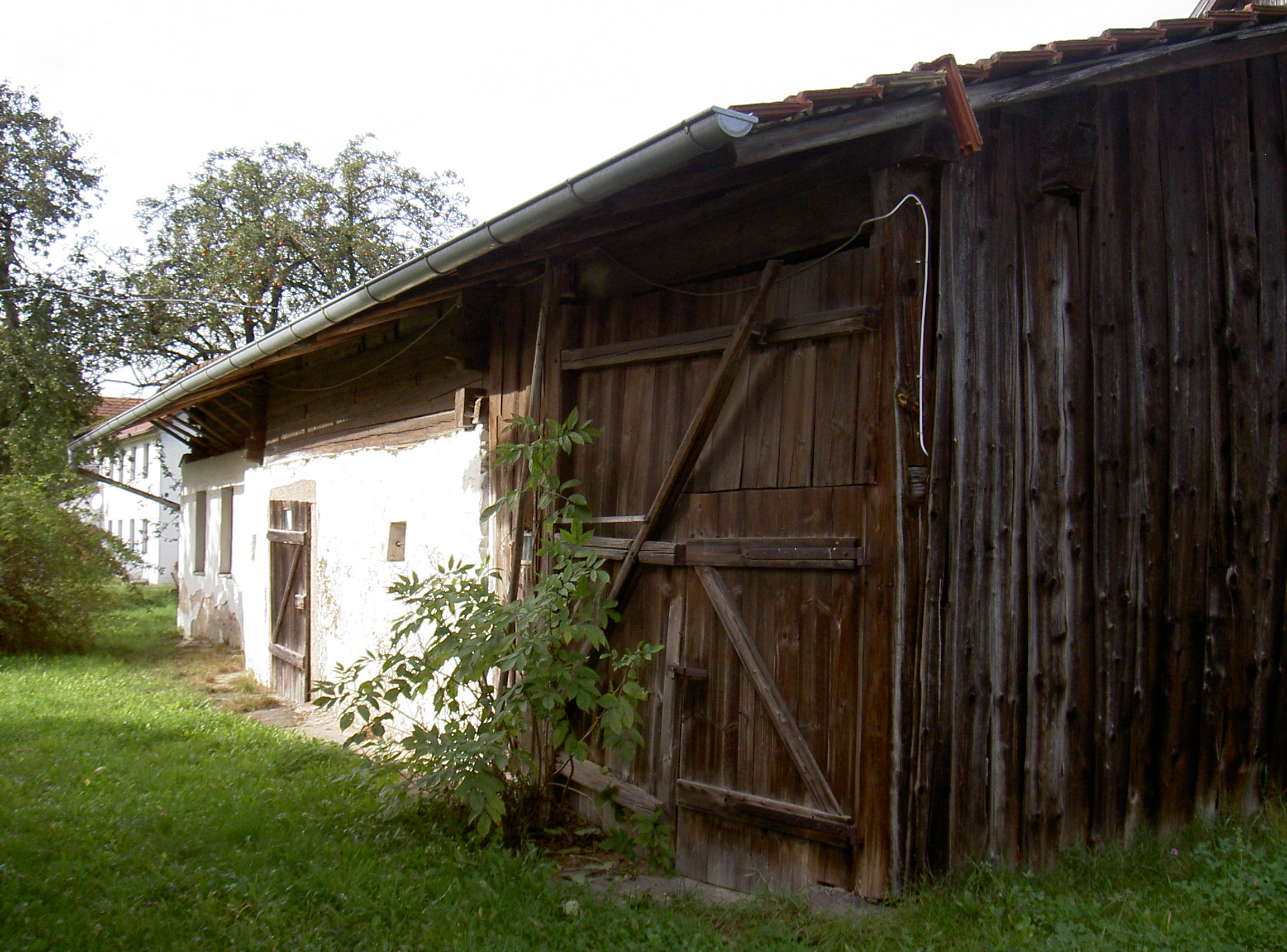
The Waldlerhaus is usually a poor person's house

The Waldlerhaus is, as a rule, a single-ridge house (Einfirsthaus) with a gable roof. They are mostly small one- or two-storey unit farmhouses with a cattle shed at the back. A barn is usually built onto the end. The ground floor may be made of stone. The knee wall (Kniestock) or upper storeys are usually made of wood. Stone-weighted shakes formed the original roof coverings; later replaced by interlocking tiles (Falzziegel). The broad eaves of the roof were designed for with the high levels of precipitation in the low mountains in mind. They offered good drainage of rainwater and dry open-air storage. In switching the roofing to tiles, the roof pitch often had to be increased, something that can easily be seen from the beams on the roof ridge. Tiles were favoured in the 20th century because they reduced fire insurance premiums.

The house entrance is almost always on the eaves side. In the Bavarian Forest Museum Village, however, there are several houses with an entrance at the gable end. In front of the main door is the so-called Gred, a usually cobbled, rain-protected path along the eaves side. The house door opens into a corridor, the so-called Flez. The first door towards the gable leads immediately into the living room or Stube, which is usually square, with two windows in the gable and a door on the eaves side.

On the gable end on the upper floor, rarely on the eaves side, it is common to have a balcony called the Gang or Schrot. This balcony is very often boarded for up to a few square metres, probably as protection against the rigours of the harsh climate. The king post (Firstsäule) is one of the few decorative elements, but also fulfils the function as a means of hanging up various things. The eaves side of the upper storey is also used externally. The bracket beams (Konsolbalken) were adapted so that boards, rods, ladders and the like could be stored here in the dry.

In the forest areas there were rarely wealthy farmers. As a result, the Waldlerhaus is often small. The smallest ones are called Sacherl or Gütl. A Waldlerhaus is also used in many larger farms as an Austragshaus for the older generation, as they hand over the farm.

== Gallery ==
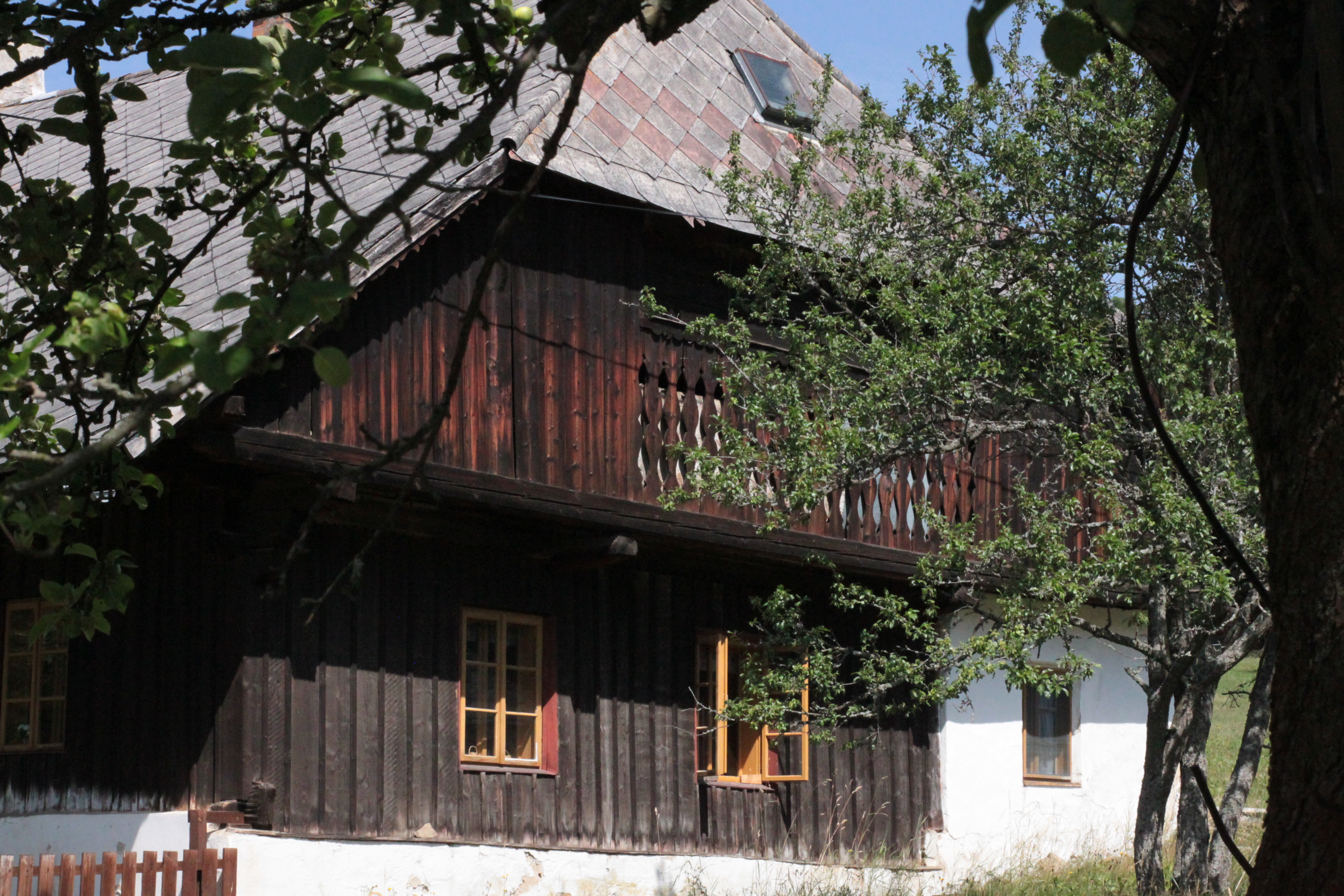
The Schopfwalm ist der wohl entscheidendste Unterschied

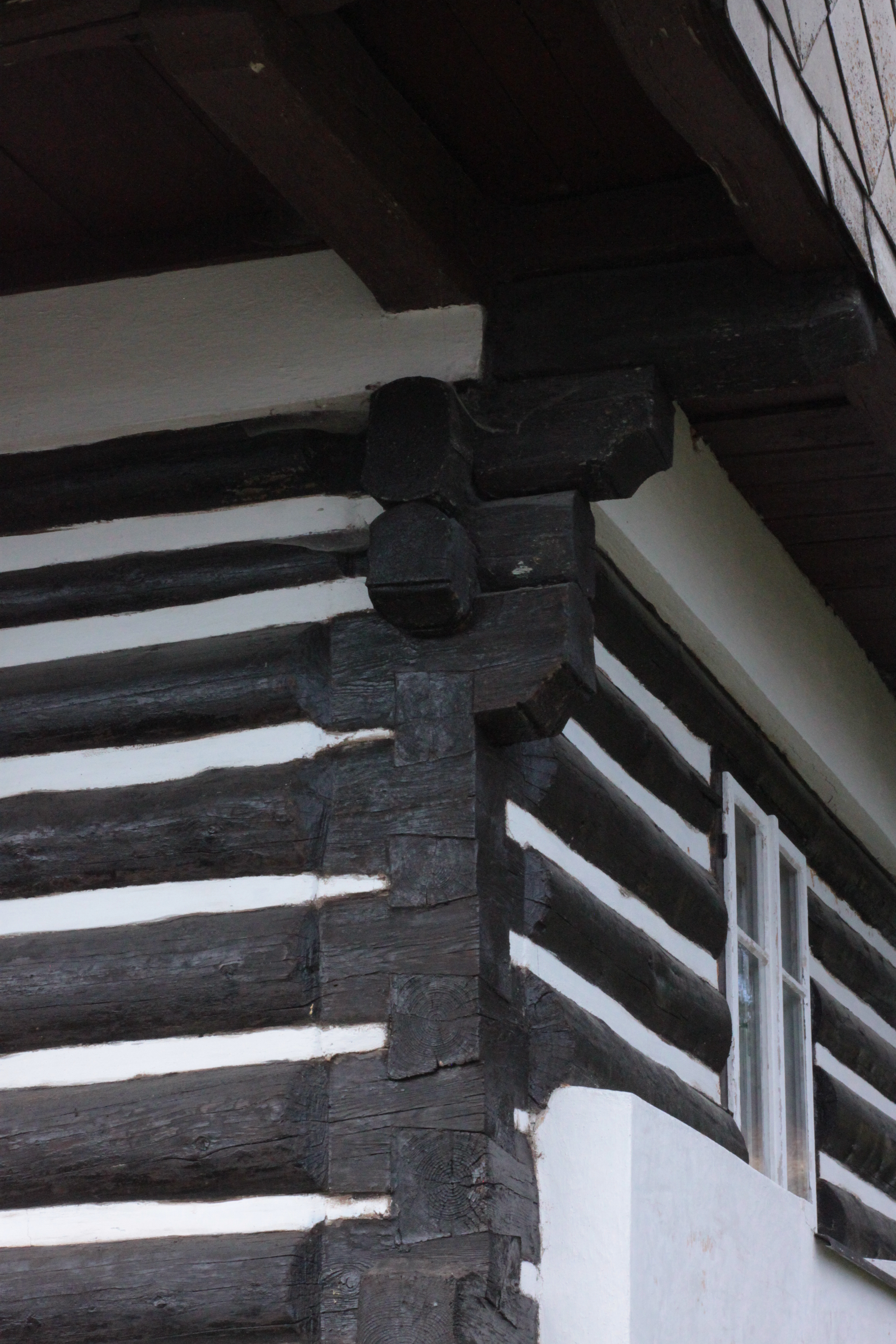
Mit hellem Putz verstrichene Zwischenräume sind häufig in Masákova Lhota zu finden

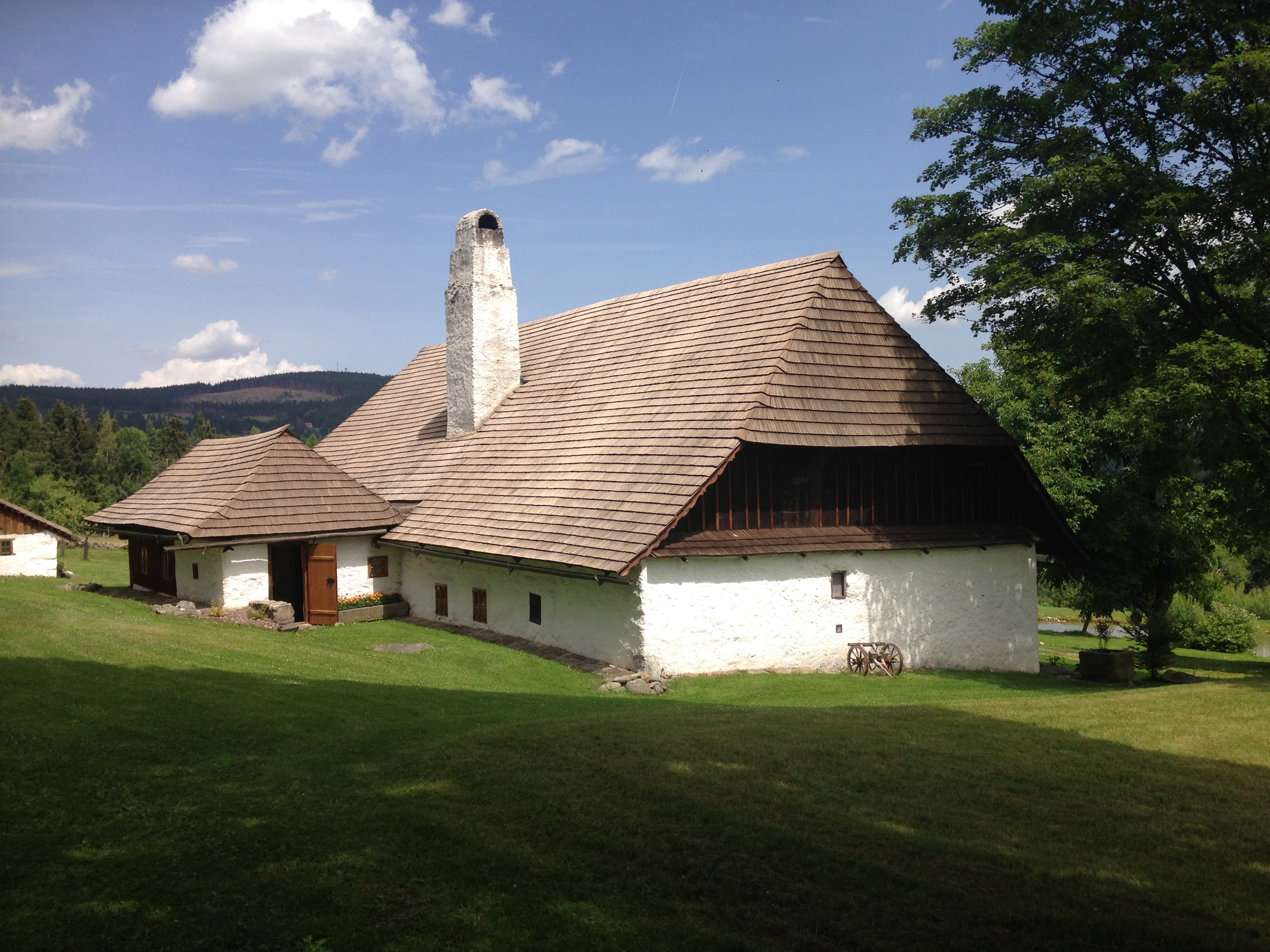
In den „Deutsch Chaluppen“ bei Stachau/Stachy ist einer der am besten erhaltenen Böhmerwaldhöfe zu finden

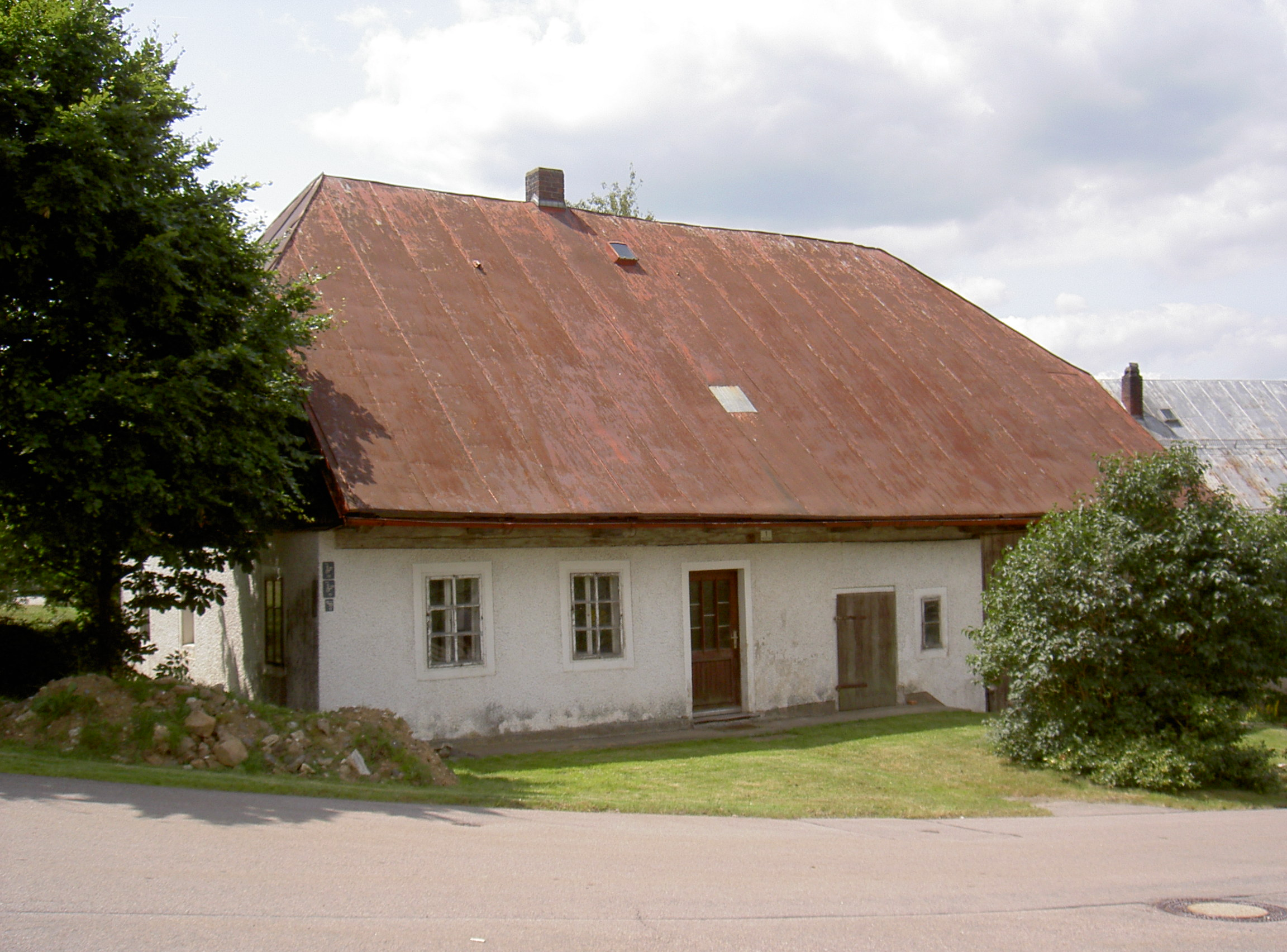
Mit dem Halbwalmdach rechnet man dieses 2017 mit dem Denkmalpreis versehene Haus in Stadlern (Landkreis Schwandorf) eher zum Typus Böhmerwaldhaus

== Literature ==
- Gabriele Blachnik: Auf dem Weg zu den Bayerwaldhöfen, Vier Radtouren und eine Wanderung, publ. by the Finsterau Open-Air Museum, 2007
- Ortmeier, Martin: Bauernhäuser in Niederbayern, Passau, 1989
- Baumgartner, Georg / Ortmeier, Martin (Hrsg.): Freilichtmuseum Finsterau (Bayerische Museen 3), Munich, 1986
