= Röhrnbach =

- Municipality
- Coat of arms

- Location of Röhrnbach within Freyung-Grafenau district
- Interactive map of Röhrnbach
- Location within Germany Location within Bavaria
- Coordinates: 48°44′N 13°32′E
- Country: Germany
- State: Bavaria
- Admin. region: Niederbayern
- District: Freyung-Grafenau

Government
  - Mayor (2020–26): Leo Meier

Area
  - Total: 40.66 km^{2} (15.70 sq mi)
- Elevation: 434–688 m (1,424–2,257 ft)

Population (2025-12-31)
  - Total: 4,291
  - Density: 105.5/km^{2} (273.3/sq mi)
- Time zone: UTC+01:00 (CET)
  - Summer (DST): UTC+02:00 (CEST)
- Postal codes: 94133
- Dialling codes: 08582
- Vehicle registration: FRG
- Website: www.roehrnbach.de

Röhrnbach is a municipality in the district of Freyung-Grafenau in Bavaria in Germany.
