= List of locomotives and railbuses of the Imperial Royal Austrian State Railways =

This list gives an overview of the Locomotives and railbuses of the Imperial Royal Austrian State Railways (German: kaiserlich-königliche österreichische Staatsbahnen) or kkStB.

== Steam locomotives ==
=== Express and passenger train locomotives ===
Express and passenger train locomotives
kkStB Class Grouping	Origin	Number	First Name	Type	Year of Manufacture	Manufacturer	Preserved	Remarks
1.01–08; 1.09–13; 1.14–23; 1.24–28	KRB I Tarvis–Pontafel Railway; KEB; LCJE IIIe	57–71; 201–209; 2", 51", 251–257, 67" (267); 123–127	GRIMMING; VOGELBACH; LINZ"; BURZA	2'B n2	1877; 1879; 1882–1883; 1883	Wr. Neustadt; Wr. Neustadt; Wr. Neustadt, Floridsdorf; Wr. Neustadt	BBÖ 1	Some rebuilt to kkStB 2
201.01	ÖNWB Ia	81	RITTINGER	2'B n2	1873	Wr. Neustadt		Sold in 1910 to a Hungarian industrial railway
301.01–09; 301.10–17	ÖNWB Ic; ÖNWB Id	84–92; 93–100		2'B n2	1881; 1884	Wr. Neustadt; StEG	ČSD 252.0	
401.01	ÖNWB Ib	82–83	FOUCAULT	2'B n2	1874	Floridsdorf		
2.01–29; 2.30–41; 2.42–60	KRB/KEB; GT	4", 9", 37", 268–276, 296–312; 1153–1164	ST. PÖLTEN"	2'B n2	1884–1885; 1885; 1893–1910 (Rebuild)	Wr. Neustadt, StEG; Wr. Neustadt	BBÖ 2, ČSD 254.0, PKP Od12, ...	Rebuilt from kkStB 1
102.01–06; 102.07–19; 102.20–24	ÖNWB XIIa; ÖNWB XIIc; ÖNWB XIIb	661–666; 667–674, 681–685; 676–680		2'B n2	1891; 1895–1896; 1892	Floridsdorf; Floridsdorf; Floridsdorf	ČSD 254.1	
3.01–13; 3.21–23	KFJB; MSCB IIe	201–213; 27–29		2'B n2	1879–1880; 1892	Wr. Neustadt; Floridsdorf		Rebuild to kkStB 4.181–193; Reclassified to kkStB 103.21–23
103.01–08; 103.21–23	BNB IIa; MSCB IIe	13–20; 27–29		2'B n2	1889–1899; 1892	Floridsdorf, Wr. Neustadt; Floridsdorf	ČSD 253.0; ČSD	Reclassified from kkStB 3.21–23
4.01–180; 4.181–193; 4.194–195; 4.196–199; 4.201–214	LCJE; BWB A	50–53	GERSTNER	2'B n2	1885–1896; 1879–1880; 1896; 1890; 1896–1897	Wr. Neustadt, Floridsdorf, Krauss/Linz, StEG; Wr. Neustadt; Wr. Neustadt; Wr. Neustadt; StEG, Wr. Neustadt	BBÖ 4, ČSD 254.2, PKP Od13, FS 543, ...	Rebuilt from kkStB 3.01–13 Reclassified from 104.01–14
104.01–41	KFNB IIc	184–224	BRUNA	2'B n2	1884–1893	Wr. Neustadt, Krauss/Linz, Floridsdorf	ČSD 264.6, PKP Od14	
5.01–26	StEG 23.0	23.01–26		1B1 n2	1883–1885	StEG, Hanomag	BBÖ 5, GySEV 201–206	
105.01–02	StEG 23.5	23.51–52		1B1 n2	1888	StEG	BBÖ 105	
205.01–30	StEG 24	24.01–30		1B1 n2	1886–1896	StEG	ČSD 254.3	
6.01–68				2'B n2v	1894–1898	Floridsdorf, Wr. Neustadt, StEG	BBÖ 6, ČSD 264.0, PKP Pd12	
106.01–99				2'B n2v	1898–1902	StEG, Floridsdorf, Wr. Neustadt	BBÖ 106, ČSD 264.1, PKP Pd13, FS 554	
206.01–70				2'B n2v	1903–1907	Wr. Neustadt, BMMF, Floridsdorf, StEG	BBÖ 206, ČSD 265.0, PKP Pd14, JDŽ 111	
306.01–03				2'B h2v	1908	StEG	BBÖ 306	
406.01–16	StEG 26	2601–2616		2'B n2	1900–1902	StEG	ČSD 264.2, MÁV 227	
506.01	StEG 25	2501		2'B n3v	1897	StEG	ČSD 264.3	
7.01–08	KEB	6, 7, 13, 29, 30, 39, 46, 207	TRAISEN"	1B n2	1879–1880	StEG	BBÖ 7	
107.21–26	CLB IIg	9", 13", 16", 17", 19", 34"		1B n2	1885	StEG	PKP	Reclassified from kkStB 7.21–26
207.01–08	KFNB IIb 3	176–183	LEOPOLDAU	1B n2	1885	StEG	BBÖ 207, PKP	
307.01	KFNB IIb 2	90	MINOS"	1B n2	1873	Floridsdorf		1883 Rebuilt from 1A1 n2 KFNB Ib
407.01	KFNB IIb 1	79	KOMET"	1B n2	1862	Sigl/Vienna		1882–1883 Rebuilt from 1A1 n2 KFNB Ia
108.01–25				2'B1' n4v	1901–1910	BMMF, Wr. Neustadt, StEG	BBÖ 108, ČSD 275.0	
208.01–08	ÖNWB XVIb	701–708		2'B1' n2v	1901	StEG	ČSD 264.4	
308.01–45	KFNB IId	225–269		2'B1 n2	1895–1907	Wr. Neustadt	BBÖ 308, ČSD 274.0, PKP Pf12	1913–1916 three locomotives converted to 2C kkStB 227
308.500–511	KFNB IId	270–281		2'B1 n2	1908	Wr. Neustadt	BBÖ 308	
9.01–38				2'C n2v	1898–1903	StEG, Floridsdorf, BMMF	BBÖ 9	
109.01–14	StEG 36.5	3651–3664		2'C n4v	1902–1904	StEG	BBÖ 109	
209.01–04	ÖNWB XIX	776–779		2'C n4v	1904	StEG	ČSD 354.2	subsequently rebuilt to ČSD 364.2
309.01–04	ÖNWB XVIII	751–754		2'C n3v	1904	StEG	ČSD 354.3	subsequently rebuilt to ČSD 364.2
10.01–19				1'C1' h4v	1909–1910	StEG, Wr. Neustadt, BMMF	BBÖ 10, ÖBB 15	
110.01–12, 15–18				1'C1' n4v	1905–1907	Floridsdorf	BBÖ 110	
110.500–518				1'C1' t4v	1906–1909	Floridsdorf, Wr. Neustadt	BBÖ 110.5	
210.01–11				1'C2' t4v	1908	Floridsdorf, BMMF	PKP Pn11	ex 210.05 (Pn11-4) after 1945 SŽD Пн11-4
310.01–90				1'C2' h4v	1911–1916	Floridsdorf, Wr. Neustadt, BMMF, StEG, Breitfeld & Danek	BBÖ 310, ČSD 375.0, PKP Pn12, ÖBB 16	
310.300–306 (309)				1'C2' h4v	1918	Floridsdorf	BBÖ 310.3, Preußische S 11, PKP Pn12	with Brotan boiler
910.01–22				1'C1' h2	1916–1918	Floridsdorf	ČSD 364.0	
11.01–05; 11.11–29	ÖNWB XIVa; ÖNWB XIVb	601–605; 611–629		2'C n2 2'C n2v	1896–1900; 1896–1909	StEG	ČSD 354.4	
111.01–08	KFNB IIa	1001–1008		2'C h2	1907	Wr. Neustadt	ČSD 365.1	
211.01–10	StEG 36.0	3601–3610		2'C h2	1908	StEG	ČSD 363.0, MÁV 329	
12.01–37	KEB I	1–48, 81–86	WIEN	1B n2	1858–1863	Wr. Neustadt, StEG, Sigl/Vienna, Werkstätte der KEB		
112.01–02				1A1 n2vt	1907	Krauss/Linz	BBÖ 112	
13.01–06								see kkStB Class 20
14.01–27	StEG 22	2201–2256		B3' n2st	1857–1872	Cockerill/Seraing, StEG		
15.01–06; 15.07–12	ÖNWB IIb; ÖNWB IIc	1", 2", 4", 7", 9", 12"; 3", 5", 6", 8", 10", 11"	AUSTRIA"; LIEBENAU"	2'B n2	1883; 1887	Floridsdorf; Wr. Neustadt	BBÖ 15	
16.01–02; 16.03–30; 16.31–46	MSCB; ÖNWB IIIa; ÖNWB IIIb	25–26; 13–42; 43–58	STEPHENSON; PAMBOUR	2'B n2	1874; 1870–1871; 1873	Floridsdorf; Wr. Neustadt; Floridsdorf	ČSD 232.0, PKP	
17.01–08	CLB IIf	10–12, 28–29, 31, 36, 39		1B n2	1884	Hartmann/Chemnitz	ČSD 244.0	
18.01–13; 18.21–34, 41–44; 18.51–61	LCJE IIIa,b; CLB IIa,b,c; BWB I	IIIa 18–27; IIIb 46–48; IIa 9–15, 30–42; IIb 16–27; IIc 5–8; 1–3, 9–15, 26	PIORUN; MEDYKA; PRAG	1B n2	1866–1870; 1859–1868; 1861–1864	StEG, Sigl, Neilson & Co./Glasgow; Wr. Neustadt, Sigl/Vienna, Sigl/Wr. Neustadt; Sigl/Vienna, Sigl/Wr. Neustadt, Maffei/Munich		
19.01–03; 19.04–07; 19.08–11	EUGE II; UWB II; LCJE IIId	8", 9", 21"; 4–6, 8; 128–131	LOT	1B n2	1874; 1871–1872; 1873	Sigl/Wr. Neustadt	BBÖ 19, PKP Oc13	baugleich MÁV II / MÁV 238
20.01–06; 20.11–16	EPPK; EPPK	7–12; 1–6		1B n2	1876; 1873	Wr. Neustadt; Sigl/Vienna	ČSD	
21.01–30	KEB II	115–132, 154–165	ISCHL	1B n2	1869–1872	StEG, Wr. Neustadt	BBÖ 21	
121.01–49	KFNB IIIb 1,2	110–161	NORDSTERN"	1B n2	1867–1873	StEG, Strousberg/Hannover, Wr. Neustadt	BBÖ 121, PKP	
22.01–04; 22.11–19; 22.31–40; 22.41–48	KRB I KRB I CLB IId; CLB IIe	49–55; 31–47; 1–4, 14, 21–23, 33, 37; 15, 18, 20, 25, 26, 30, 35, 40	EISENERZ; LAIBACH; LWÓW	1B n2	1873; 1870; 1870–1871; 1878, 1882	Mödling; Krauss/Munich; Esslingen; Wr. Neustadt		1905 Reclassified to kkStB 122; 1905 Reclassified to kkStB 122 PKP
122.01–04; 122.11–19	KRB I KRB I	49–55; 31–47	EISENERZ; LAIBACH	1B n2	1873; 1870	Mödling; Krauss/Munich	BBÖ 122	1905 Reclassified from kkStB 22
23.01–09	Vorarlberg Railway	1–6, 7"–9"	BREGENZ	1B n2	1872, 1876	Krauss/Munich, StEG	BBÖ 23, FS 121	
123.01–05; 123.06	BNB I BNB II	7–12; 1–6		1B n2	1867–1868; 1865, 1874	Wr. Neustadt; Georg Sigl/Vienna, Mödling	ČSD 232.3	ex TKPE 1–4, 16, 17
24.01–32	KFJB	1–32	JOHANN ADOLPH	1B n2	1868–1872	Georg Sigl/Vienna, Wr. Neustadt	ČSD 233.0, PKP Oc12	
25.01–12	GT			1B n2	1884	StEG		
26.01–22	KFJB	33–50, 151–154		1B n2	1873	Georg Sigl/Vienna, Floridsdorf	ČSD 233.1	
27.01–11	KFNB IIIc	801–811		2'C n2	1902–1903	Wr. Neustadt	ČSD 354.5, MÁV 331, JDŽ 112	
127.01–03	BNB IIb	131–133		2'C n2	1903–1904	Wr. Neustadt	ČSD 353.0	
227.12, 36, 38	KFNB IId	236, 260, 262		2'C n2	1913–1916 (Rebuild)			Rebuilt from kkStB 308
28.01–05				1C n2	1884	Krauss/Munich		
128.01–06	BNB IIc	181–186		1C h2	1905–1907	BMMF	ČSD 342.0	
228.01–20	StEG 39	3901–3920		1C h2	1907	StEG	ČSD 344.0	
29.01–36				1'C1' h2vt	1912	BMMF, Floridsdorf	BBÖ 29, JDŽ 116, PKP OKl11, ÖBB 175, ČSD 354.0505	
129.01–17				1'C n2v	1902	Floridsdorf, Wr. Neustadt		Rebuild to kkStB 229.4
229.01–239				1'C1' n2vt	1904–1918	Wr. Neustadt, Floridsdorf, StEG, BMMF, Krauss/Linz	BBÖ 229, PKP OKl12, ČSD 354.0, JDŽ 116, FS 912, ÖBB 75, ČSD 354.0501–0503, 0506	
229.401–417				1'C1' n2vt	1902	Floridsdorf, Wr. Neustadt	BBÖ 229.4, PKP OKl12, ČSD 354.0, JDŽ 116, ÖBB 75, ČSD 354.0504	Rebuilt from kkStB 129
329.01–93				1'C1' tn2v	1907–1909	Floridsdorf, Wr. Neustadt, StEG, BMMF	BBÖ 329, PKP Ol11, ČSD 354.6, JDŽ 107, FS 687	
429.01–57				1'C1' h2v	1909–1910	StEG, Wr. Neustadt, Floridsdorf	BBÖ 429, PKP Ol12, ČSD 354.7, JDŽ 106, ÖBB 135	
429.100–225				1'C1' h2v	1911–1916	StEG, BMMF, Floridsdorf, Wr. Neustadt	BBÖ 429.1, PKP Ol12, ČSD 354.7, FS 688, JDŽ 106, MÁV 323,9, ÖBB 35, ÖBB 135	
429.900–999, 1900–1996				1'C1' h2	1911–1918	Floridsdorf, BMMF, Wr. Neustadt, StEG	BBÖ 429.9, PKP Ol12, ČSD 354.7, FS 688, JDŽ 106, ÖBB 35	
629.01–25				2'C1' h2t	1917–1918	StEG	BBÖ 629, ÖBB 77	
929.01–15	KRB II	1–29	STEYR	C n2	1868–1869	Sigl/Vienna	BBÖ 929, NÖLB 5	1912 Reclassified from kkStB 29
30.01–99, 101–114				1'C1' n2vt	1895–1901	Floridsdorf, Wr. Neustadt, StEG	BBÖ 30, GKB 30, ÖBB 90	

=== Goods locomotives ===
Goods train locomotives
kkStB Class Grouping	Origin	Number	First Name	Type	Year of Manufacture	Manufacturer	Preserved	Remarks
31.01–04; 31.01–11; 31.11–16	Vorarlberg Railway; StEG IVf; Dniestr Railway	17–20; 1001–1053; 3–8	LINDAU DROHOBYCZ	C n2 C n2 B n2	1872; 1877–1880; 1872	Krauss/Munich; StEG; Krauss/Munich	BBÖ 31	1894 Reclassified to kkStB 35.91–94 and 1904 in kkStB 135.91–94 1897–1899†
131.01–27	StEG IVf'	1054–1080, 3451–3477		C n2	1887–1890	StEG	ČSD 333.0	
231.01–35	StEG IVfn	501–518, 3501–3535		C n2	1890–1904	StEG	BBÖ 231	1925–1943 6 units to the GySEV as 301–306
32.01–12; 32.13–24; 32.31–91	Tarnów–Leluchów State Railway; Rakonitz–Protivín; StEG	1–12; 201–212; 504–581, 758–859, 3301–3374	BIAŁA; BERAUN; BERAUN	C n2	1875–1876; 1875–1876; 1866–1873	StEG; StEG, Floridsdorf, Wr. Neustadt; StEG	BBÖ 32, FS 198; ČSD 311.0; BBÖ 32, ČSD 311.1	
33.01–32	KEB	49–80, 87–89	SCHWANENSTADT	C n2	1860–1866	Sigl/Vienna, Sigl/Neustadt, StEG, Werkstätte der KEB		
133.01–12	SNDVB	13–44	STARKENBACH	C n2	1858–1870	Hartmann	ČSD 311.2	reboilered by the Austrian Northwestern Railway
34.01–43	KRB	2–74, 98–108	ST. VALENTIN	C n2	1868–1873	Sigl/Vienna, Sigl/Neustadt, Maffei, Mödlinger Lokomotivfabrik	BBÖ 34, FS 194	
35.01–56; 35.57–59	KFJB; ÖNWB	51–106; 133–135		C n2	1868–1871; 1869	Sigl/Vienna, Sigl/Neustadt; Sigl/Vienna	BBÖ 35, ČSD 312.3, FS 195	
135.91–94	Vorarlberg Railway	17–20	LINDAU	C n2	1872	Krauss/Munich	BBÖ 135, FS 196	
36.01–14	EPPK	21–34		C n2	1872	Sigl/Vienna	ČSD 312.8	
37.01–06	Dalmatian State Railway	1–6		C n2	1877	Wr. Neustadt	JDŽ 121	
38.01–06, 09–97	CLB	50", ...	ZŁOCZÓW	C n2	1868–1878	Wr. Neustadt, StEG, Esslingen	FS 221	
39.01–04	EPPK	35–38		C n2	1876	Floridsdorf	ČSD 322.0	
40.01–30; 40.51–65; 40.70–99	LCJE IVd; CLB IIIa,b,c; BWB II,III	1−17, 35–39, ... 43–70; 4, ...	CZERNOWITZ; TREMBOWINA; KLADNO	C n2	1866–1887; 1859–1864; 1861–1871	Sigl/Neustadt, StEG, Sigl/Vienna, Dübs & Co; Sigl/Neustadt, Günter/Neustadt, Sigl/Vienna; Sigl/Neustadt, Maffei/Munich, Sigl/Vienna	ČSD 312.4	
43.01–04	KFNB Vd	222–225	MÄHRISCH OSTRAU	C n2	1863	Sigl/Neustadt	ČSD 312.5	
45.01–08	DBE	1–8		C n2	1871	Köchlin/Mülhausen	ČSD 312.6	
46.01–16; 46.17; 46.18–25; 46.26–28; 46.29–36; 46.37–43	EAB; MGB; EUGE; UWB; EUGE; LCJE	1–16; 11; 13–20; 43–45; 23–26; 64–67, 155–157	ALBRECHT; WIESENBERG BORTNIKI	C n2	1873–1874; 1872; 1872; 1872–1873; 1885–1889; 1872–1874	Sigl/Neustadt; Sigl/Neustadt; Sigl/Neustadt; Sigl/Vienna, Sigl/Neustadt; Wr. Neustadt; Sigl/Vienna, Sigl/Neustadt	BBÖ 46	1885–1888: kkStB 5501
47.01–69	KEB IV	90, ...	STRASSBURG	C n2	1867–1884	Sigl, StEG, Wr. Neustadt, Krauss/Linz	BBÖ 47, FS 222, ÖBB 53	
147.01–02; 147.03–13; 147.14–18	TKPE III; BNB III; TKPE IV	5–10; 27–37; 11–15		C n2	1865; 1867–1868; 1872–1873	Sigl/Neustadt; Sigl/Vienna; Sigl/Neustadt	ČSD 322.1; ČSD 322.1	
48.01–23				C n2	1885–1888	Wr. Neustadt, Floridsdorf	BBÖ 48, FS 223, JDŽ 127	
49.01–08	MGB	3–10	GRULICH	C n2	1873	Floridsdorf, Wr. Neustadt	ČSD 323.0, WLB 62 (64)	
149.01–75	KFNB Vc1,2	226, ...	ANGERN	C n2	1865–1870	StEG, Sigl/Neustadt	BBÖ 149, ČSD 311.3	
50.01–25; 50.26–28	PDE; KRB IV	92–96	BRÜX; KAISERBERG	C n2	1872–1883; 1873	Floridsdorf; Floridsdorf	ČSD 312.0; ČSD 312.0, FS 219	
51.01–120	KFNB Vd	391–510	DRÖSING	C n2	1871–1889	StEG, Sigl/Neustadt, Floridsdorf, Wr. Neustadt	BBÖ 51, ČSD 312.1, ČSD 313.0	
151.01–55	ÖNWB Vb,c,d,e	38–85, 184–193	GUERICKE	C n2	1871–1872	Hanomag, Schwartzkopff, Floridsdorf	ČSD 312.2	
52.01–10	Istrian State Railway	101–110	CANFANARO	C n2	1875	Floridsdorf, Mödlinger Lokomotivfabrik	BBÖ 52	
53.01–26; 53.31–63	DBE; BNB V	9–34; 57–89		C n2	1872–1882; 1871–1901	Sigl/Neustadt, Sigl/Vienna, Wr. Neustadt, StEG; Sigl/Neustadt, Wr. Neustadt	ČSD 314.0; ČSD 323.1, FS 218	
54.01–40; 54.41–49; 54.50–63	GT; KRB IV; k.k. Stb. Tarvis–Pontafel; MSCB	1111–1152; 130–142; 200–202; 1–14	KLACHAU; MAX	C n2	1884–1885; 1873–1879; 1872–1873	Floridsdorf, Wr. Neustadt, Borsig; Floridsdorf; Floridsdorf	FS 217; ČSD 313.1; BBÖ 54, ČSD 313.1	
55.01–20	ÖNWB XIa,b	241–260		C n2	1889–1899	Floridsdorf	ČSD 324.0, FS 262	
155.01–18	SNDVB XIII	201–218		C n2	1891–1896	StEG	ČSD 314.1, FS 224, JDŽ 127	
56.01–153				C n2	1888–1900	Wr. Neustadt, Floridsdorf, StEG	BBÖ 56, ČSD 324.1, FS 261, JDŽ 127, ÖBB 253	
59.01–193				C n2v	1893–1903	Wr. Neustadt, Floridsdorf, StEG, Krauss/Linz, BMMF	BBÖ 59, ČSD 324.2, FS 127, JDŽ 127, PKP Th24, ÖBB 353, JDŽ 121	
159.01–04, 11–20	KFNB Ve	511–524	ADERKLAA	C n2v	1890–1891	Wr. Neustadt	ČSD 334.0	
60.01–297; 60.500–521; 60.800–802				1C n2v 1C t2v 1C h2v	1895–1910; 1904–1908; 1908	Wr. Neustadt, Floridsdorf, StEG, BMMF; Floridsdorf, Wr. Neustadt, StEG, BMMF; Floridsdorf	BBÖ 60, ČSD 334.1, FS 604, JDŽ 131, PKP Ti12, MÁV 330,3, MPS Ти12, ÖBB 54	
160.01–46				1C h2v	1909–1910	Wr. Neustadt, BMMF	FS 605, PKP Ti16, MÁV 330,9, MPS Ти16	
260.01–06; 260.11–225	KFNB VIII	531–536; 525–530, 537–745		1C n2 1C n2v	1893; 1893–1908	Wr. Neustadt; Wr. Neustadt, Floridsdorf, StEG, BMMF	ČSD 333.1, PKP Ti11; BBÖ 260, ČSD 333.1, JDŽ 130, PKP Ti11, MPS Ти11, ÖBB 154	
360.01–04; 360.11–26; 360.100; 360.500–501	ÖNWB XVIIa; ÖNWB XVIIb; ÖNWB XVIId; ÖNWB XVIId	281–284; 261–276; 286; 287–288		1C n2 1C n2v 1C n2 1C h2	1902; 1901–1904; 1906; 1906	Floridsdorf; Floridsdorf; StEG; StEG	BBÖ 360, ÖBB 254; BBÖ 360, FS 606, JDŽ 136, ÖBB 354; BBÖ 360; BBÖ 360	
460.01–23	ÖNWB XVIIc	285, 289–300, 221–230		1C h2	1906–1909	Floridsdorf	BBÖ 460, ÖBB 454	
560.01–34; 560.51–71	StEG 37.0; StEG 37.5	3701–3734; 3751–3771		1C n2 1C n2v	1899–1906; 1900–1902	StEG; StEG	ČSD 344.3, FS 607; ČSD 334.2, FS 607, ČSD 344.1	
660.01–10	StEG 38.5	3851–3860		1C n3v	1905	StEG	BBÖ 660, ČSD 344.2, ČSD 344.3, ČSD 344.1	
760.01–43	StEG 38.0	3801–3843		1C h2	1906–1909	StEG	ČSD 344.1	
61.01–05	KEB 0	175–179		C n2t	1873	Hartmann	BBÖ 61	
62.01–08; 62.09–10	KRB III; Dniester Railway	76–90; 1–2	FOHNSDORF; CHYRÓW	C n2t	1872; 1872	Krauss/Munich	BBÖ 62	Renumbered from kkStB 6001–6002
162.01–04; 162.05–12; 162.14–15; 162.16–20; 162.21–23; 162.24–30; 162.41–42; 162.43–45	ÖNWB; BNB VIa; LB Castalowitz–Reichenau–Solnitz; ÖNWB; LB Starkenbach/Martinitz–Rochlitz; RGTE; KFNB IX; BNB VIa	1A–4A; 111–117, 121; 1S–2S; 451–455 11G–15G; 904", 920; 118–120	RYCHNOV EMIL MÜLLER; WILHELM	C n2t	1890–1891; 1896–1905; 1893; 1895; 1899; 1894–1909; 1895; 1904–1905	Wr. Neustadt; Wr. Neustadt, BMMF; Floridsdorf; Floridsdorf; Floridsdorf; Krauss/Linz; Krauss/Linz; BMMF	ČSD 313.4	
262.01–03	ÖNWB	1M–3M	MĚLNIK	C n2t	1897–1903	Krauss/Linz, BMMF	ČSD 311.4	
362.01–13	BNB VI	91–103		C n2t	1882–1905	Krauss/Munich, Krauss/Linz	ČSD 320.1	
462.01	StEG		KORITSCHAN	C n2t	1907	Floridsdorf	ČSD 302.0	
63.01–10	KRB III	110–128	TERGLOU	C n2t	1874	SLM	BBÖ 63	
163.01–04; 163.05–11; 163.12–21; 163.22–25; 163.26–51	ÖNWB Xb; ÖNWB Xa; ÖNWB Xc; ÖNWB Xd; ÖNWB Xe	508–511; 501–507; 512–521; 551–554; 522–541, 561–566		C n2t	1881; 1882; 1884; 1890; 1891–1901	Floridsdorf; Schwartzkopff; StEG; Floridsdorf; Floridsdorf, StEG	ČSD 314.2	
64.01	BLB		GOESS	C n2vt	1897	Krauss/Linz	ČSD 313.7	
164.01	BLB		KONRAD HOHENLOHE	C h2t	1906	Krauss/Linz		
264.01–03	BLB		KOCHANOWSKI	C n2vt	1907	StEG		
364.01–04	BLB		STRONAR	C h2t	1908–1913	Krauss/Linz		
464.01–03	BLB		PFLAUM	C h2t	1909–1913	Krauss/Linz		
564.01–03	KFNB IX	909–911	PAWLOWITZ	C n2vt	1897	Krauss/Linz	ČSD 313.5	
65.01	KRB	58	KALWANG	C1 n2t	1871	Maffei		1901 Rebuilt from kkStB 3429
265.01–02	BNB VIb	126–127		C1 n2t	1907	BMMF	ČSD 312.7	
66.01–37	KFNB X	35–71		C n2t	1898–1908	StEG	ČSD 314.3, PKP TKh17	
166.01–40	StEG 32	3201–3240		C n2t	1882–1892	StEG, Hanomag	BBÖ 166, ČSD 334.5	
67.01–04	KFNB VI	387–390	MICHALKOWITZ	C n2t	1873	Wr. Neustadt	ČSD 304.0	
167.01–02	KFNB VI	385–386	HERMENEGILD	C n2t	1880	Floridsdorf	ČSD 304.1	
69.01–18				C1zz n2t	1890–1908	Floridsdorf	BBÖ 69, ÖBB 97	
169.50–52	RGTE	21G–23G	DESSENDORF	D1zz n4t	1901	Floridsdorf	ČSD 404.0	Renumbered from kkStB 69.50–52
269.01–03				Fzz n4t	1913	Floridsdorf	BBÖ 269, ÖBB 197	
70.01–24	KEB V	166–174, 189–203	LIEZEN	D n2	1873–1875	Hartmann, Siegl/Vienna, Floridsdorf	BBÖ 70, ČSD 402.0	
170.01–645				1D n2v	1897–1918	Wr. Neustadt, Floridsdorf, StEG, BMMF, Breitfeld & Danek	BBÖ 170, ČSD 434.0, FS 729, JDŽ 24, PKP Tr11, MPS Тр11, ÖBB 56, GKB 56	
270.01–08				1D h2	1917–1918	BMMF	ČSD 434.1, MÁV 403	
470.01–12				1D1 h4v	1914–1918	Floridsdorf	BBÖ 470, BBÖ 670, ÖBB 39	
71.01–08	EPPK	51–58		D n2	1876–1881	Floridsdorf, Wr. Neustadt	ČSD 401.1	
171.01–20; 171.21–28; 171.29–62	ÖNWB VIIa; LCJE IVf; ÖNWB VIIb,c,d,e	321–340; 70–77; 341–374	MICHELANGELO; DNIESTER"; CANOVA	D n2	1873; 1876–1877; 1874–1883	Sigl/Neustadt; Floridsdorf; Floridsdorf, Esslingen, Wr. Neustadt	ČSD 411.0, MÁV 459; ČSD 411.0; ČSD 411.0, MÁV 459	
271.01–06	SNDVB/ÖNWB VI	301–306	CARL IV.	D n2	1872–1873	Floridsdorf	ČSD 411.1	
571.01–73	StEG 42	4201–4273	TETSCHITZ	D n2	1868–1875	StEG	BBÖ 571, ČSD 401.1	
72.01–10	KFJB	131–140		D n2	1883	Floridsdorf	ČSD 403.0	
73.01–454				D n2	1885–1909	Floridsdorf, Wr. Neustadt, Krauss/Linz, StEG, BMMF	BBÖ 73, ČSD 414.0, FS 424, JDŽ 133, PKP Tp15, MPS Тп15, ÖBB 55	
74.01–06	BNB Va	151–156		D n2	1903–1908	Wr. Neustadt	ČSD 414.1	
174.01–20; 174.500–523				D n2 D t2	1906–1914; 1908–1911	Floridsdorf; Wr. Neustadt, Floridsdorf, StEG, BMMF	BBÖ 174, ČSD 414.2, PKP Tp17	
75.01–06	StEG 43	4301–4306		D n2	1890	StEG	ČSD 414.3	
175.01–19	StEG 44	4401–4419		D h2	1894–1900	StEG	ČSD 414.4	
76.01–04	kkStB Class IV	501–504		D n2	1884	Wr. Neustadt	BBÖ 76	
176.15–19	BWB V		HERKULES	D n2	1881–1888	Wr. Neustadt	ČSD 403.1	
77.01–08	PDE		KLOSTERGRAB	D n2	1884–1886	Floridsdorf	ČSD 403.2	
7801–7805; 78.10–11	kkStB V II; RGTE	1G–2G	MAFFERSDORF	D n2t	1884; 1888	Krauss/Munich; Wr. Neustadt	ČSD 400.0	
178.01–213				D n2vt	1900–1918	Krauss/Linz, Floridsdorf, StEG, BMMF, Wr. Neustadt	BBÖ 178, ČSD 422.0, PKP TKp11, FS 893, JDŽ 52, ÖBB 92, MPS ТКп11, SZD Тъ-22, WLB 71	
278.01–08				D h2vt	1909–1911	Krauss/Linz	PKP TKp12	
378.01–04	StEG 41	4101–4104		D n2t	1880–1881	StEG	ČSD 403.3	
478.01–19; 478.20–21; 478.22–23	StEG 400; Brandeis–Neratowitz	40001–40019	BRANDEIS	D n2t	1885–1907; 1899; 1912	StEG	ČSD 400.1	
79.01–02	Arlberg Railway			D2 n2t	1884–1885	Floridsdorf	BBÖ 79	
179.01–16	StEG 40	4001–4016		1D n2t	1908–1909	StEG	ČSD 421.0	
80.01–36; 80.100–203; 80.900–2911				E h2v E h2v E h2	1909–1910; 1911–1915; 1911–1918	Floridsdorf, StEG, Wr. Neustadt; Wr. Neustadt, StEG, Breitfeld & Danek; Wr. Neustadt, Breitfeld & Danek, StEG, BMMF	BBÖ 80, FS 475, JDŽ 28, ÖBB 157, PKP Tw12; BBÖ 80, FS 475, JDŽ 28, ÖBB 157, PKP Tw12; BBÖ 80, ČSD 524.0, FS 476, JDŽ 28, PKP Tw12, MPS Тв12, ÖBB 57	
180.01–181; 180.500–557				E n2v E t2v	1900–1908; 1907–1910	Floridsdorf, StEG, BMMF, Wr. Neustadt; Floridsdorf, Wr. Neustadt	BBÖ 180, ČSD 523.0, FS 477, JDŽ 135, PKP Tw11; BBÖ 180, ČSD 523.0 (ČSD 524.2), FS 477, JDŽ 135, PKP Tw11, MPS Тв11	
280.01–03				1E t4v	1906–1907	StEG	BBÖ 280	
380.01–02; 380.100–125				1E h4v	1909; 1911–1914	StEG; StEG, Wr. Neustadt, Floridsdorf	FS 479; BBÖ 380, FS 479, JDŽ 07	
100.01				1F h4v	1911	Floridsdorf	BBÖ 100	

=== Light Locomotives ===
Light Locomotives
kkStB Class Grouping	Origin	Number	First Name	Type	Year of Manufacture	Manufacturer	Preserved	Remarks
83.01–02, 11, 16, 21–26; 83.31–33; 83.36–37; 83.51; 8361–8362	ÖLEG; BLB; Krems Valley Railway; NÖSWB; ÖLEG A	012–014 1–6	ALESANI; KLAUS	B n2t	1877–1884; 1884; 1887; 1879; 1882–1883	Krauss/Munich, Floridsdorf, Krauss/Linz; Krauss/Linz; Krauss/Linz; Krauss/Munich; Krauss/Munich	ČSD 200.0	1892 Renumbered from kkStB 8501
183.01–04	ÖLEG B	7–10		B n2t	1881	Floridsdorf		
283.01–02	StEG 200	20001–20002		B n2t	1884	Hagans		
383.01	BCB IIH		JIČIN	B n2t	1880	Hagans		
8401–04; 8441–43	ÖLEG D MSCB	301–304; 30–32		B n2t	1883; 1883	Krauss/Munich; Floridsdorf		
8500; 8501; 85.02–07; 85.08–09; 85.10; 85.11–14, 05"	KRB; NÖSWB; NÖSWB; EAB; KFNB IX; BCB IIS	1C; 2C–7C 902	HARTIG KROMĚŘIŽ; LIBAŇ	B n2t	1871; 1879; 1880; 1882; 1881; 1881	Wöhlert; Krauss/Munich; Wr. Neustadt; Wr. Neustadt; Wr. Neustadt; Wr. Neustadt	BBÖ 85	1892 Renumbered to kkStB 8351
185.01				B n2vt	1903	Krauss/Linz		
86.01–03				B n2vt	1905–1907	Krauss/Linz	PKP TKb14, JDŽ 161	
87.01–04	PDE		SWOLENOWES	B n2t	1880–1883	Wr. Neustadt, Krauss/Linz	ČSD 220.0	
88.06–52				B n2t	1882–1885	Krauss/Linz	BBÖ 88, ČSD 222.0, FS 809	
188.01–04	KEB L	208–211		B n2t	1880	Wr. Neustadt		Renumbered from 8801 to 8804
288.71–72	BWB S		DOBŘICHOWITZ	B n2t	1884	Krauss/Munich		Renumbered from 8871 to 8872
89.01–04	KTB III		BAD HALL	1B n2t	1892–1899	Krauss/Linz	BBÖ 89	
189.01–04				1B n2vt	1895–1899	Krauss/Linz	BBÖ 189	1903 Rebuilt from kkStB Gv
289.01–18	KFNB VII	1–34	URANUS	1B n2t	1847–1853	Haswell	BBÖ 289	
389.01–02	ÖNWB VIII	481–484		B1 n2t	1869	Sigl/Vienna		
90.01–02	MGB	1–2	HOHENSTADT	C n2	1871	Sigl/Vienna		
91.01–07	NÖSWB	1B–7B		C n2	1876	WrN	BBÖ 91	
191.01–02	KFNB IX	907–908	ALEXANDERFELD	C2 n2t	1888	WrN	ČSD 300.0	
92.01–16	tw. NÖSWB	1A–6A		C n2	1876–1889	WrN	BBÖ 92, ČSD 321.0	
93.01–05, 11–13; 93.11"–12"; 93.13"–17"; 93.16–18; 93.18"–19"; 93.20"–21"	ÖLEG F KFNB IX; ÖNWB; KTB; BCB III Kc; RGTE	501–512; 905–906; 502L–509L 5G–6G	LINZ; TAXIS; REICHENBERG	C n2t C n2t C n2t C n2t B n2t C n2t	1880–1883; 1881–1883; 1881–1902; 1881–1883; 1882; 1888	Krauss/Munich, Krauss/Linz; Floridsdorf; Floridsdorf, Krauss/Munich; Krauss/Munich; Krauss/Linz; Krauss/Linz	ČSD 300.1; ČSD 300.1 ČSD 300.2	UN kkStB 193 UN kkStB 293
193.01–02; 193.16–18	BCB III Ka; KTB		VŠESTAR; LINZ	C n2t	1881; 1882–1883	Krauss/Munich; Krauss/Munich		Renumbered from kkStB 93.16–18
293.20–21	RGTE	5G–6G	REICHENBERG	C n2t	1888	Krauss/Linz	ČSD 300.2	Renumbered from kkStB 93.20–21
393.01–15	StEG 30	3001–3015		C n2t	1876–1881	StEG	BBÖ 393	
493.01–02				C n2t	1911	StEG	ČSD 300.3	
94.01–05; 94.11–12; 94.31–36, 51–53; 94.41–43; 94.61–65	ÖLEG G ÖLEG G BLB, NBLB, LCJE Mühl District Railway	601–604; 605–606	PINO; POTOCKI; URFAHR	C n2t	1882–1883; 1882; 1886–1899; 1891–1903; 1888	Krauss/Munich; Krauss/Munich; Krauss/Linz; Floridsdorf; Krauss/Linz	BBÖ 94	UN kkStB 194; UN kkStB 294 UN kkStB 394; UN kkStB 494
194.01–04	ÖLEG G	601–604		C n2t	1882–1883	Krauss/Munich		Renumbered from kkStB 9401–9404
294.04–10, 13; 294.11–12	Bozen-Meran Railway; ÖLEG G	1, 5–10; 605–606	MERAN	C n2t	1882–1905; 1881	Krauss/Linz; Krauss/Munich	FS 899"	Renumbered from kkStB 9411–9412
394.41–47			POTOCKI	C n2t	1891–1903	Floridsdorf	FS 826, JDŽ 151, PKP TKh14	Renumbered from kkStB 9441–9447
494.61–65	Mühl District Railway		URFAHR	C n2t	1888	Krauss/Linz	BBÖ 494	Renumbered from kkStB 9461–9465
9501–03; 95.11–12	LCJE; CLB	101–102, 104; 201–202	BOJAN	C n2t	1865–1884	MW&C, Worcester; StEG		
195.01–20	StEG 300, 310, 320	30001–30003, 31001–31010, 32001–32007		C n2t	1879–1884	Werkst. StEG/Simmering, StEG	BBÖ 195, ČSD 300.4	
96.01–02; 96.03–04; 96.05–06; 96.07; 96.08–12	Fehring–Fürstenfeld Kuttenberger LB; BNB; BCB IIIKb	1–2 1087K–1088K; 90	MODŘAN	C n2t	1885; 1889; 1882; 1881; 1881–1883	Krauss/Munich; Krauss/Linz; Krauss/Munich; Krauss/Munich; Krauss/Munich	BBÖ 96; BBÖ 96; ČSD 300.5 ČSD 300.5	
196.01–03	StEG 330	33001–33003	SCHWECHAT	C n2t	1883	Hagans	BBÖ 196	
97.01–25, 51–255				C n2t	1878–1911	Wr. Neustadt, Krauss/Linz, StEG, Floridsdorf, BMMF	BBÖ 97, ČSD 310.0, FS 822, JDŽ 61, PKP TKh12; JDŽ 150, JDŽ 151, ÖBB 89	1934–1935: Rebuilt to from 97.153, 152 in ÖBB 69.01–02
197.01–43	KFNB IX	912–957	ANDRYCHAU	C n2t	1888–1905	Wr. Neustadt, Floridsdorf	ČSD 310.1, ČSD 310.9; ÖBB 389, PKP TKh14	
397.01; 397.02–07	BMB; BCB IIIs	3	ENGADIN; KŘINEC	C n2t	1881; 1881–1882	Wr. Neustadt; Wr. Neustadt	ČSD 310.2	
98.01–04	LCJE	031–034	KNIAZDWOR	C n2t	1886	StEG		
99.01–69				1C n2vt	1897–1908	Krauss/Linz, Floridsdorf, BMMF	BBÖ 99, ČSD 320.0, FS 876, JDŽ 153; ÖBB 91	
199.01–20				1C n2vt	1908–1913	Krauss/Linz, StEG	BBÖ 199, FS 877; ÖBB 91.1	
299.01–02				1C h2vt	1909	Krauss/Linz		

=== Narrow gauge locomotives ===
Narrow gauge locomotives
kkStB Class Grouping	Gauge	Origin	Number	First Name	Type	Year of Manufacture	Manufacturer	Preserved	Remarks
A.001–010	760 mm				B n2t	1917	O&K	ČSD U 25.0	
Cv.1–2; Cv.3–4	760 mm	BLB; NBLB		JANOSZ	D n2vt	1908; 1912	Krauss/Linz; Krauss/Linz	PKP D8; PKP Tx2	
G 1–4	1106 mm	Linz–Gmunden	1–4		B n2t	1883	Krauss/Linz		
Gv 1–4	1106 mm				1B n2vt	1895–1899	Krauss/Linz		Rebuilt to in kkStB 189
P.1–3	760 mm				D1 h2t	1911	Krauss/Linz	FS 402	
T.1–5	760 mm				C1 n2t	1898–1902	Krauss/Linz	BBÖ T, JDŽ 187; ÖBB 198	
U.1–43	760 mm				C1 n2t	1897–1913	Krauss/Linz, StEG, BMMF, Wr. Neustadt	BBÖ U, ČSD U 37.0, JDŽ 188; ÖBB 298	
Uv.1–4	760 mm				C1 n2t	1904–1910	Krauss/Linz		
Yv.1–3	760 mm				C2 n2vt	1896	Krauss/Linz	BBÖ Yv; ÖBB 598	
Z.1–4	760 mm	Pinzgau Lokalbahn		SIGMUND GRAF THUN	C n2t	1898	Krauss/Linz	BBÖ Z	

=== Steam railbuses ===
Steam railbuses
kkStB Class Grouping	Gauge	Origin	Number	First Name	Type	Year of Manufacture	Manufacturer	Preserved	Remarks
1.001–002	1435 mm	BNB			A1 n2v	1904	Ringhoffer/Prague, Komarek/Vienna	ČSD M 124.0	
1.101	1435 mm				A1 n2v	1905	Rohrbacher, Komarek/Vienna	BBÖ 1.1	
1.201–202	1435 mm				A1 n2v / 1A1 n2v	1903–1904	Ringhoffer/Prague, Komarek/Vienna		1916: Rebuilt to Ci
1.301–302	1435 mm				B2 h2 (UB 1B2 h2)	1909	Königsfeld, Komarek/Vienna	ČSD M 212.0	
1.401	1435 mm				B2 n2v	1908	Ringhoffer/Prague, Komarek/Vienna	ČSD M 223.0	
2.001	1435 mm				A1 h2	1904	Ringhoffer/Prague, Esslingen	ČSD M 113.0	
3.001; 3.002	1435 mm	ÖNWB IXa; KFNB	401; 901	FÜRSTENBERG	A1 n2t	1879; 1880	Floridsdorf; Floridsdorf		
4.001–008	1435 mm	ÖNWB IXb	402–410		A1 n2t	1880	Floridsdorf	ČSD M 112.0	
1/s.001	760 mm				A1 n2v	1903	Rohrbacher, Komarek/Vienna	BBÖ 1/s.0	

=== Tenders ===
Tenders
kkStB Class Grouping	Origin	Number	Axles	Year of Manufacture	Manufacturer	Preserved	Remarks
1.01–13	NÖSWB	1–6A, 1–7B	2	1876–1877	Wr. Neustadt		1892: Renumbered to kkStB 3
2.01–02	MGB	1–2	2	1871	Sigl/Vienna		
3.01–13; 3.14–23	NÖSWB	1–6A, 1–7B	2	1876–1877; 1887–1889	Wr. Neustadt; Wr. Neustadt	BBÖ 3, ČSD 107.0	Renumbered from kkStB 1
4.01–08	MGB	3–10	2	1873	Floridsdorf, Wr. Neustadt	ČSD 307.0	
5.01–08	PDE		2	1884–1886	Floridsdorf, Ringhoffer	ČSD 108.0	
601–606	Dniestr Railway	3–8	2	1872	Krauss/Linz		
7.01–28, 31–60	StEG 23, 23.5, 24	2301–2326, 2351–2352, 2401–2430	2	1883–1896	Hannover, StEG	BBÖ 7, ČSD 110.0	
8.01–07; 8.08–21, 96–98; 8.22–95, 99–118	KRB; MSCB; KFNB H2	130–142; 1–14; 3,...	2	1874–1877; 1872–1892; 1871–1880	Floridsdorf; Floridsdorf; StEG, Wr. Neustadt, Floridsdorf	ČSD 309.0; BBÖ 8, ČSD 309.0; BBÖ 8, ČSD 309.0	
9.01			2	1900	Floridsdorf	BBÖ 9	
10.01–189	KEB	1–189	3	1858–1875	Günter, StEG, Sigl/Vienna, Hartmann, Wr. Neustadt, Floridsdorf	BBÖ 10, ČSD 508.0	Some rebuilt to kkStB 31
11.01–09	SNDVB IV	9, 101–108	3	1858–1859	Ringhoffer	ČSD 108.1	
12.01–12; 12.13–24	Tarnów–Leluchówer State Railway; Rakonitz–Protivín Railway	1–12; 201–212	3	1875; 1875–1876	Ringhoffer; StEG, Wr. Neustadt, Floridsdorf	BBÖ 12; ČSD 509.0	1905: Renumbered from kkStB 17
13.01–115; 13.116–118	KFJB; ÖNWB Va	1–115; 133–135	3	1868–1880; 1869	Ringhoffer, Sigl/Vienna, Floridsdorf, Wr. Neustadt; Sigl/Vienna	BBÖ 13, ČSD 309.1	
14.01–62	BNB A	1–73	3	1865–1900	Ringhoffer, Sigl/Vienna, Wr. Neustadt	ČSD 309.2	
15.01–06	Dalmatian State Railway	1–6	3	1877	Wr. Neustadt		
16.01–50			3	1884–1885	Ringhoffer, Borsig		
1701–1712	Rakonitz–Protivín Railway	201–212	3	1875–1876	StEG, Wr. Neustadt, Floridsdorf		1905: UN in kkStB 12.13–24
18.01–10	Istrian State Railway	101–110	3	1875–1876	Floridsdorf, Mödlinger Lokomotivfabrik	BBÖ 18	
19.01–36	EPPK	1–36	3	1872–1876	Sigl/Vienna, Ringhoffer	ČSD 409.0	
20.01–194	CLB		3	1859–1878	Sigl/Vienna, Sigl/Wr. Neustadt, StEG, Neilson & Co., Ringhoffer, Esslingen	BBÖ 20	
21.01–06	SNDVB VI	301–306	3	1872	Floridsdorf	ČSD 309.3	
22.01–38	BWB	1–38	3	1861–1885	Ringhoffer, Simmering, Werkstätte Pilsen	BBÖ 22, ČSD 509.1	
23.01–08; 23.09–10; 23.11–160	LCJE; MSCB; ÖNWB IIIa, Vb,c,d,e, VIIa,b,c,d,e	70–77; 25–26; 13,...	3	1876; 1873; 1870–1883	Floridsdorf; Floridsdorf; Sigl/N., Hannover, Schwartzkopff, Sigl/Vienna, Floridsdorf	ČSD 410.0; ČSD 410.0; ČSD 410.0	
24.01–04	SNDVB IVa,b	109–112	3	1872–1875	Ringhoffer, Floridsdorf	ČSD 209.0	
25.01	ÖNWB Ia	81	3	1874	Sigl/Wr. Neustadt		
26.01–18, 20	ÖNWB Ib,c,d	82–100	3	1874–1884	Floridsdorf, Wr. Neustadt, StEG	ČSD 310.0	
27.01–38	ÖNWB XIa,b, XIII	201–218, 241–260	3	1891–1899	StEG, Floridsdorf	ČSD 411.0	
28.01–14	SNDVB IIb,c	1–8, 10–12, 328, 345, 352	3	1901–1909	Ringhoffer	BBÖ 28, ČSD 411.1	
29.01–24	ÖNWB XIIa,b,c	661–685	3	1891–1896	Floridsdorf	ČSD 412.0	
30.01–25	PDE	1–25	3	1872–1883	Ringhoffer	ČSD 510.0	
31.01–27; 31.28–97	Arlberg Railway tw. UB kkStB 10		3	1858–1885	Wr. Neustadt, Krauss/Linz, Floridsdorf; Günther, StEG, Sigl/Vienna, Hartmann, Floridsdorf, Wr. N.	BBÖ 31, ČSD 412.2; BBÖ 31, ČSD 412.2	
33.01–34	DBE	1–34	3	1871–1882	Ringhoffer, Sigl/Wr. Neustadt, Sigl/Vienna, Wr. Neustadt, StEG	ČSD 412.3	
34.01–13; 34.21–39	Vorarlberg Railway; CLB B	1–9, 17–20; 9,...	3	1872–1876; 1861–1885	Krauss/Munich, StEG; Ringhoffer, Wr. Neustadt	BBÖ 34; BBÖ 34, ČSD 510.1	
35.01–97; 35.98–99	KRB; LCJE	1,... 020–021	3	1868–1884; 1889	Sigl/W., Wst. Sim., Sigl/N., Kr./Mü, Maff., Flor., Mödl., Wr. N. StEG	BBÖ 35, ČSD 410.1	
36.01–299, 301–656			3	1885–1896	Wr. Neustadt, StEG, Ringhoffer, Floridsdorf	BBÖ 36, ČSD 312.0; ÖBB 9036	
37.01–212	StEG 33, 34, 35, 38, 42	3301, ...	3	1866–1904	StEG	BBÖ 37, ČSD 309.4; ÖBB 9037	
38.01–25	StEG 43, 44	4301–4306, 4401–4419	3	1890–1900	StEG	ČSD 312.1	
39.01–10	KFJB	131–140	3	1883–1884	Ringhoffer	ČSD 212.0	
40.01–16; 40.17; 40.18–24; 40.25–39; 40.40–43; 40.44–54	EAB; Renumbered from 3801; UWB; EUGE LCJE	1–16; 3801; 4–6, 9, 43–45; 8,... 64,...	3	1873–1874; 1872; 1872–1873; 1872–1885; 1889; 1872-1874	Sigl/Wr. Neustadt; Sigl/Wr. Neustadt; Sigl/Wr. Neustadt, Sigl/Vienna; Sigl/Wr. Neustadt, Wr. Neustadt; Wr. Neustadt; Sigl/Wr. Neustadt, Sigl/Vienna	BBÖ 40	
41.01–05	BWB	42–46	3	1882–1888	Ringhoffer	ČSD 611.0	
42.01–08	BNB B	50–51, 59–62, 69–70	3	1889–1899	Floridsdorf, Wr. Neustadt	ČSD 310.1	
43.01–05	KFNB A	283–286, 858	3	1863	Sigl/Wr. Neustadt		
44.01–17	KFNB F	65, 287–304	3	1865–1867	StEG, Sigl/Wr. Neustadt, Werkstätte Simmering	BBÖ 44, ČSD 508.1	
45.01–99	KFNB G	112,...	3	1867–1872	Sigl/Wr. Neustadt, Avonside, StEG, Hannover, Wr. Neustadt	BBÖ 45, ČSD 410.4	
46.01–78	KFNB L	184,...	3	1884–1889	Ringhoffer, Wr. Neustadt, Krauss/Linz, StEG, Floridsdorf	BBÖ 46, ČSD 210.0	
47.01–235	KFNB M	511–745	3	1890–1904	Wr. Neustadt, Floridsdorf, StEG, Ringhoffer	BBÖ 47, ČSD 412.4, JDŽ 130; ÖBB 9047	
48.01–12	KFNB N	213–224	3	1891–1893	Floridsdorf	ČSD 412.5	
49.01–10	ÖNWB XIIb,c, XVIIa,b	261–268, 281–282	3	1901–1902	Floridsdorf	BBÖ 49; ÖBB 9049	
51.01–18	ÖNWB XIVa,b	601–605, 611–623	3	1896–1903	StEG	ČSD 415.1	
52.01–08	ÖNWB XVIb	701–708	3	1901	StEG	ČSD 315.0	
53.01–08	ÖNWB XVIII, XIX	751–754, 776–779	3	1904–1905	StEG	ČSD 415.2	
54.01–22	ÖNWB, SNDVB XVIIc	289–300, 221–230	3	1908	Floridsdorf	BBÖ 54; ÖBB 9054	
55.01–06	ÖNWB XIVb	624–629	3	1909	StEG	ČSD 417.0	
56.01–342			3	1894–1908	Floridsdorf, Wr. Neustadt, Ringhoffer, StEG, BMMF, Lipiński, Bromovský	BBÖ 56, ČSD 517.0, PKP 17 C 11; ÖBB 9056	
156.01–1425, 1432–1472, 1533–1569, 1598–1642, 1800–1842			3	1910–1918	Floridsdorf, BMMF, Ringhoffer, Wr. Neustadt, StEG, Lipiński, Breitfeld & Danek	BBÖ 156, ČSD 516.0; ÖBB 9156	
256.01			3	1915	Wr. Neustadt	BBÖ 256; ÖBB 9256	
57.01			3	1908	Floridsdorf	ČSD 517.0104	1910: Renumbered to kkStB 56.342
58.01–08	KFNB Q	1001–1008	3	1907	Wr. Neustadt	ČSD 716.0	
66.01–369			3	1896–1913	Ringhoffer, Wr. Neustadt, StEG, Floridsdorf, Werkstätte Gmünd, Bromovský, BMMF	BBÖ 66, ČSD 412.3, PKP 12 C 13; ÖBB 9066	
67.01–06	BNB D	101–106	3	1903	Ringhoffer	ČSD 312.2	
70.01–06	BNB E	121–126	3	1905–1908	Ringhoffer	ČSD 110.1	
71.01–03	BNB C	81–83	3	1903–1904	Wr. Neustadt	ČSD 414.1	
72.01–152	StEG 25, 26, 36.5, 37, 37.5, 38, 38.5, 39	2501,...	3	1897–1909	StEG	BBÖ 72, ČSD 313.1, ČSD 713.0	
73.01–10	StEG 36	3601–3610	3	1908	StEG	ČSD 512.0	
74.01–57	KFNB O	225–281	3	1895–1908	Wr. Neustadt	BBÖ 74, ČSD 415.0	
75.01–11	KFNB P	801–811	3	1902–1903	Wr. Neustadt	ČSD 412.2	
76.01–718			3	1897–1910	Wr. Neustadt, StEG, Floridsdorf, Ringhoffer, Lipiński, BMMF	BBÖ 76, ČSD 414.0; ÖBB 9076	
86.01–127			4	1902–1916	Ringhoffer, Floridsdorf, BMMF, Wr. Neustadt, StEG, Breitfeld & Danek	BBÖ 86, ČSD 621.0, ČSD 821.0, PKP 21 D 11; ÖBB 9086	
88.01–02			4	1916	StEG	BBÖ 88, ČSD 727.0	

=== Water wagons ===
Water wagons
kkStB Class Grouping	Gauge	Origin	Number	Axles	Year of Manufacture	Manufacturer	Preserved	Remarks
0.01–05; 0.06–10; 0.11–13; 0.21–25; 0.26; 0.31; 0.33; 0.41–50	1435 mm	StEG; ÖNWB R BNB	20030,... 29004	2; 3; 3; 3; 3; 3; 3; 3	1887; 1876; 1877; 1854–1884; 1881; 1894; 1869/1912; 1882–1905	Ringhoffer; Ringhoffer; Wr. Neustadt; StEG; Ringhoffer; Ringhoffer; Ringhoffer; Ringhoffer, kkStB workshops in Laun		
0.100; 0.101–106	1435 mm	StEG; ÖNWB IV	20031; 1–6	2	1846; 1858/1896	Speker/Vienna; Ringhoffer		
0.500; 0.501	1435 mm	BNB R	503202; 1200	2; 3	1889	Ringhoffer		
0/s.01–04	760 mm		298–299, 251–252	2	1901–1904	Graz		
0/s.101–103	760 mm		300–302	3	1908–1910	Graz		

== Electric locomotives ==
Electric locomotives
kkStB Class Grouping	Type	Power system	Year of Manufacture	Manufacturer	Preserved	Remarks
1060.001–009	1'C	AC; 15.000 V, 15 or 16 2/3 Hz	1911–1912	Floridsdorf	BBÖ 1060	
1083.001	Bo	DC 1.250 V	1912	Ringhoffer, ÖSSW	ČSD E 200.0	
1084.001–002	Bo	DC 750 V	1913	Graz, ÖSSW		

== Electric railbuses ==
Electric railbuses
kkStB Class Grouping	Gauge	Type	Power system	Year of Manufacture	Manufacturer	Preserved	Remarks
20.001–002	1435 mm	Bo	DC 650 V	1905	Graz, ÖSSW	Montafon Railway Cmg 1–2	
21.001–003	1435 mm	Bo	DC 750 V	1908	Graz, AEG	Stern & Hafferl 21.150–152	
22.001–003	1435 mm	Bo	DC 1.250 V	1911	Ringhoffer, ÖSSW	ČSD M 201.0	
23.001–003	1435 mm	Bo	DC 750 V	1913	Graz, ÖSSW		
40.001–004	1435 mm	Bo'Bo'	DC; 1400 or 1500 V	1903–1906	Ringhoffer, František Křižík	ČSD EM 400.0	
41/s.001–012	1000 mm	BoBo	DC 750 V	1909–1910	Graz, AEG	FS 41/s 001–012, SATP 41/s 001–012	
42/s.001–002	1000 mm	BoBo	DC 750 V	1910	Graz, AEG	FS 42/s 001–002, SATP 42/s 001–002	

== Combustion-engined railbuses ==
Combustion-engined railbuses
kkStB Class Grouping	Gauge	Type	Year of Manufacture	Manufacturer	Preserved	Remarks
19.001	1435 mm	1A	1902	Ringhoffer/Prague, Austro-Daimler/Wr. Neustadt	1912: Rebuilt to Ci	

== Sources ==
- Verzeichnis der Lokomotiven, Tender, Wasserwagen und Triebwagen der k.k. österreichischen State Railwayen und der vom Staate betriebenen Privatbahnen after dem Stande vom 30. Juni 1914, Wien, Verlag der k.k. Österreichischen State Railwayen
- Verzeichnis der Lokomotiven, Tender, Wasserwagen und Triebwagen der k.k. österreichischen State Railwayen und der vom Staate betriebenen Privatbahnen after dem Stande vom 30. Juni 1917, Wien, Verlag der k.k. Österreichischen State Railwayen
- Dampfbetrieb in Alt-Österreich 1837-1918, Verlag Slezak, Wien, 1979, ISBN 978-3-900134-41-9
- Johann Blieberger; Josef Pospichal (2008), Enzyklopädie der kkStB-Triebfahrzeuge, Band 1. Die Reihen 1 bis 228 (in German), bahnmedien.at, ISBN 978-3-9502648-0-7
