= Class 35 =

Class 35 or 35 class may refer to:

- British Rail Class 35, a class of British diesel locomotive
- DRB Class 35, a class of German passenger locomotives with a 2-6-2 wheel arrangement operated by the Deutsche Reichsbahn which comprised:
  - Class 35.0: BBÖ 110
  - Class 35.1: BBÖ 329, PKP Class Ol11
  - Class 35.2: BBÖ 429.9, ČSD Class 354.7
  - Class 35.3: BBÖ 429, ČSD Class 354.7, PKP Class Ol12, JDŽ 106
  - Class 35.4: ČSD Class 354.8
  - Class 35.5: ČSD Class 364.0
  - Class 35.7: PKP Class Ol103 (ex MÁV 324)
  - Class 35.8: PKP Class Ol12
- New South Wales 35 class locomotive
