= KkStB 30 =

kkStB 30 BBÖ 30 / GKB 30 DRB 90.10 / ÖBB 90
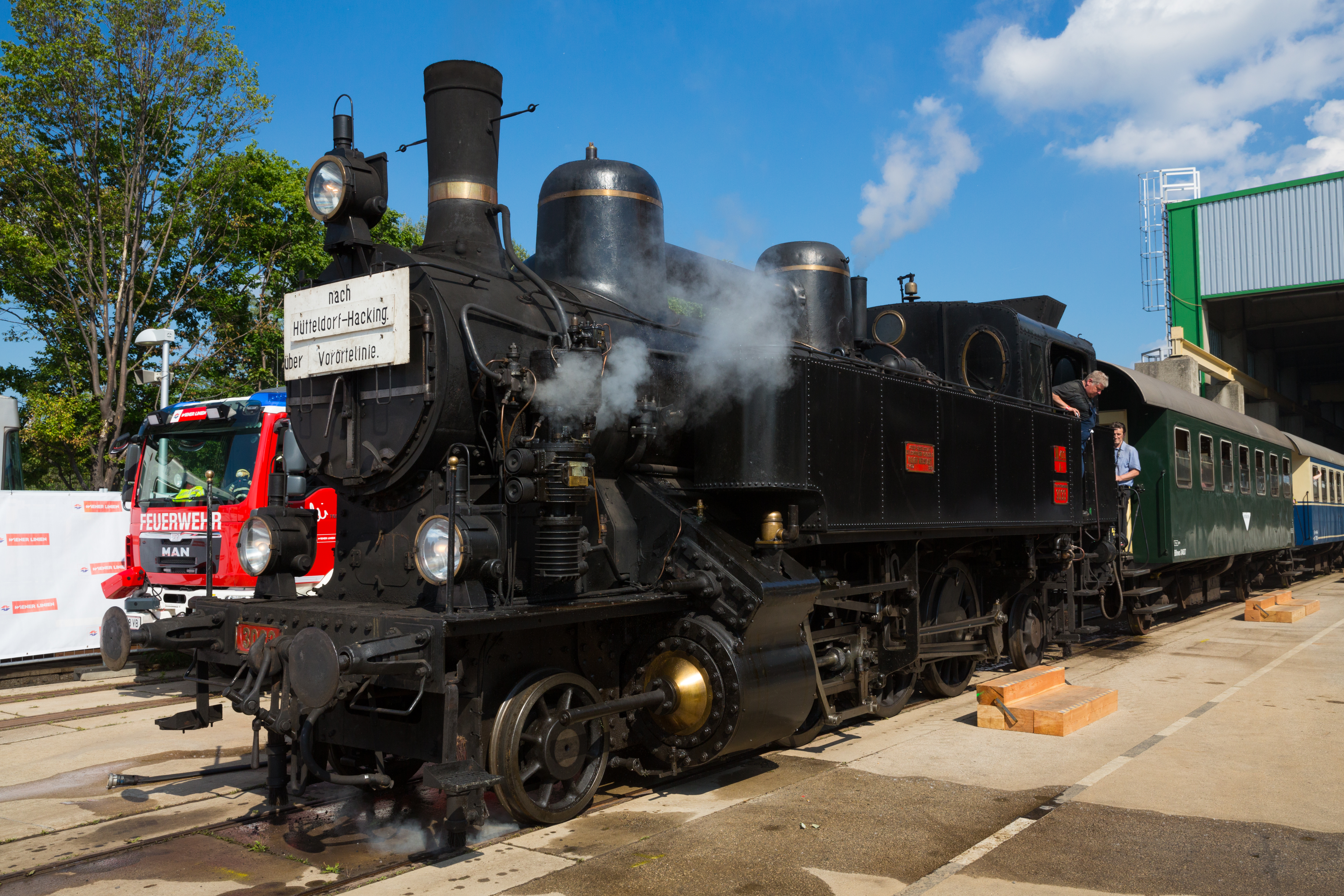
- Preserved kkStB No. 30.33 in Vienna
Type and origin
- Power type: Steam
- Builder: Lokomotivfabrik Floridsdorf (35); Wiener Neustädter Lokomotivfabrik (24); Lokomotivfabrik der StEG (54)
- Build date: 1895–1901
- Total produced: 113
Specifications
- Configuration
  - Whyte: 2-6-2T
  - UIC: 1′C1′ n2vt
- Gauge: 1,435 mm (4 ft 8 1/2 in) standard gauge
- Leading dia.: 870 mm (34.25 in)
- Driver dia.: 1,298 mm (51 1/8 in)
- Trailing dia.: 870 mm (34 1/4 in)
- Wheelbase: 7,700 mm (25 ft 3 1/8 in)
- Length: 11,334 mm (37 ft 2 1/4 in)
- Height: 4,570 mm (14 ft 11 7/8 in)
- Adhesive weight: 43.5 tonnes (42.8 long tons; 48.0 short tons)
- Loco weight: 69.5 tonnes (68.4 long tons; 76.6 short tons)
- Fuel type: Coal
- Fuel capacity: 2.4 m^{3} (85 cu ft)
- Water cap.: 8,500 L (1,900 imp gal; 2,200 US gal)
- Firebox
  - Grate area: 2.3 m^{2} (25 sq ft)
- Boiler
  - Tube plates: 4,164 mm (13 ft 7 7/8 in)
- Boiler pressure: 13 kg/cm^{2} (1.27 MPa; 185 psi)
- Heating surface
  - Firebox: 10.50 m^{2} (113.0 sq ft)
  - Tubes: 120.10 m^{2} (1,292.7 sq ft)
  - Total surface: 130.60 m^{2} (1,405.8 sq ft)
- Cylinders: Two, outside, HP right, LP left
- High-pressure cylinder: 520 mm × 632 mm (20 1/2 in × 24 7/8 in)
- Low-pressure cylinder: 740 mm × 632 mm (29 1/8 in × 24 7/8 in)
Performance figures
- Maximum speed: 60 km/h (37 mph)
Career
- Operators: Imperial Royal Austrian State Railways (kkStB); Bundesbahnen Österreich (BBÖ); Graz-Köflacher Eisenbahn (GKB); Deutsche Reichsbahn (DRB); Österreichische Bundesbahnen (ÖBB)
- Class: kkStB/BBÖ/GKB: 30; DRB: 90.10; ÖBB: 90
- Numbers: kkStB/BBÖ: 30.01–30.99, 30.101–30.114; GKB: 30.xx; DRB: 90 1001 – 90 1032; ÖBB 90.01 – 90.33 (with gaps)
- Retired: to 1957

The kkStB 30 were a class of 2-6-2T locomotives designed by Karl Gölsdorf for use of the Vienna Stadtbahn of the Imperial Royal Austrian State Railways (kaiserlich-königliche österreichische Staatsbahnen). They were specifically designed for use on the inner-city routes of the Vienna Stadtbahn, where they hauled trains of up to ten of the Stadtbahn's 4-wheeled carriages. They were built by Lokomotivfabrik Floridsdorf, Wiener Neustädter Lokomotivfabrik and Lokomotivfabrik der StEG between 1895 and 1901.

== History ==
After the decision to build the Stadtbahn in 1892, Karl Gölsdorf began to build a locomotive for the new inner-city routes. Rapid start-up characteristics with short station spacing were required on the sometimes narrow curved tracks and many inclines.

The first locomotive was delivered in 1895 with a UIC wheel arrangement of 1′C1′ n2vt, indicating a 2-6-2 saturated (n), 2-cylinder compound (v) tank (t) locomotive. During testing it reached a speed of 97 km/h (60 mph) with a smooth run. The maximum permitted speed was set at 60 km/h (37 mph). The second prototype was given a modified arrangement of wheels and valve gear that better met the requirements for reversing and was retained for series production. A total of 113 locomotives were built up to 1901. Initially numbered 3001–3099 and 13001–13014, from 1905 they were renumbered as 30.01–30.99 and 30.101–30.114. Sixty-two locomotives belonged to the Commission for Transport Systems in Vienna, one by the Niederlindewiese–Barzdorf local railway in Austrian Silesia, the remainder by the kkStB. The locomotives of the Commission for Transport Systems also had a plate with the letters "VA" on the buffer beam.

The Stadtbahn's locomotives ran from the start, based on the Berlin model, with destination signs on the smokebox door or on the rear bunker, as is a matter of course today. The machine 30.83, delivered in 1899, was an experiment. It was the only one of its type to be delivered as a condensing steam locomotive to reduce the formation of moisture in the tunnels. A discharge pipe led from the low-pressure cylinder to a special part of the left water tank, in which the steam was condensed. A ventilation pipe passed over the roof of the driver's cab was supposed to divert the steam remaining in the condensation chamber. A switching device allowed the exhaust steam to be routed either in the normal way into the blastpipe or into the condensation chamber, as required. The facility was not well received and was soon dismantled.

After the First World War, all class 30 locomotives remained in Austria. After the steam-powered Stadtbahn operations were discontinued, the locomotives were mainly used in the Vienna and Linz divisions, but also partly in Villach and Innsbruck. However, they corresponded best to the conditions in the vicinity of Vienna. In the 1930s, 13 locomotives were sold to the Graz-Köflacher Railway (GKB).

After 1921 they were later operated by Bundesbahnen Österreich (BBÖ) and following the annexation of Austria in 1938, they were incorporated within Deutsche Reichsbahn as Class 90.10. The 32 locomotives that were still in existence were renumbered as 90 1001 to 90 1032. Locomotive number 90 1033 was added later, but there was no 90 1005. After the end of the Second World War, eight locomotives remained in Hieflau. After the restoration of Austria, the Österreichische Bundesbahnen (ÖBB) kept the numbers, but in 1953 they added a dot between the class number and the serial number. These locomotives were retired by 1957. The remaining locomotives were in the Soviet zone, they were claimed by the Soviets as war booty (recognizable by the letter T in front of the locomotive number) and were withdrawn by 1953. They were no longer part of the ÖBB's portfolio.

== Preservation ==
There are two examples preserved: 30.33 and 33.109 at the Heizhaus, Strasshof. A third locomotive 30.114 was intended for preservation, but was scrapped.
