= KkStB 73 =

kkStB 73 / BBÖ 73 ČSD 414.0 / FS 424/ JDŽ 133 / PKP Tp15 DRB 55.57 / ÖBB 55
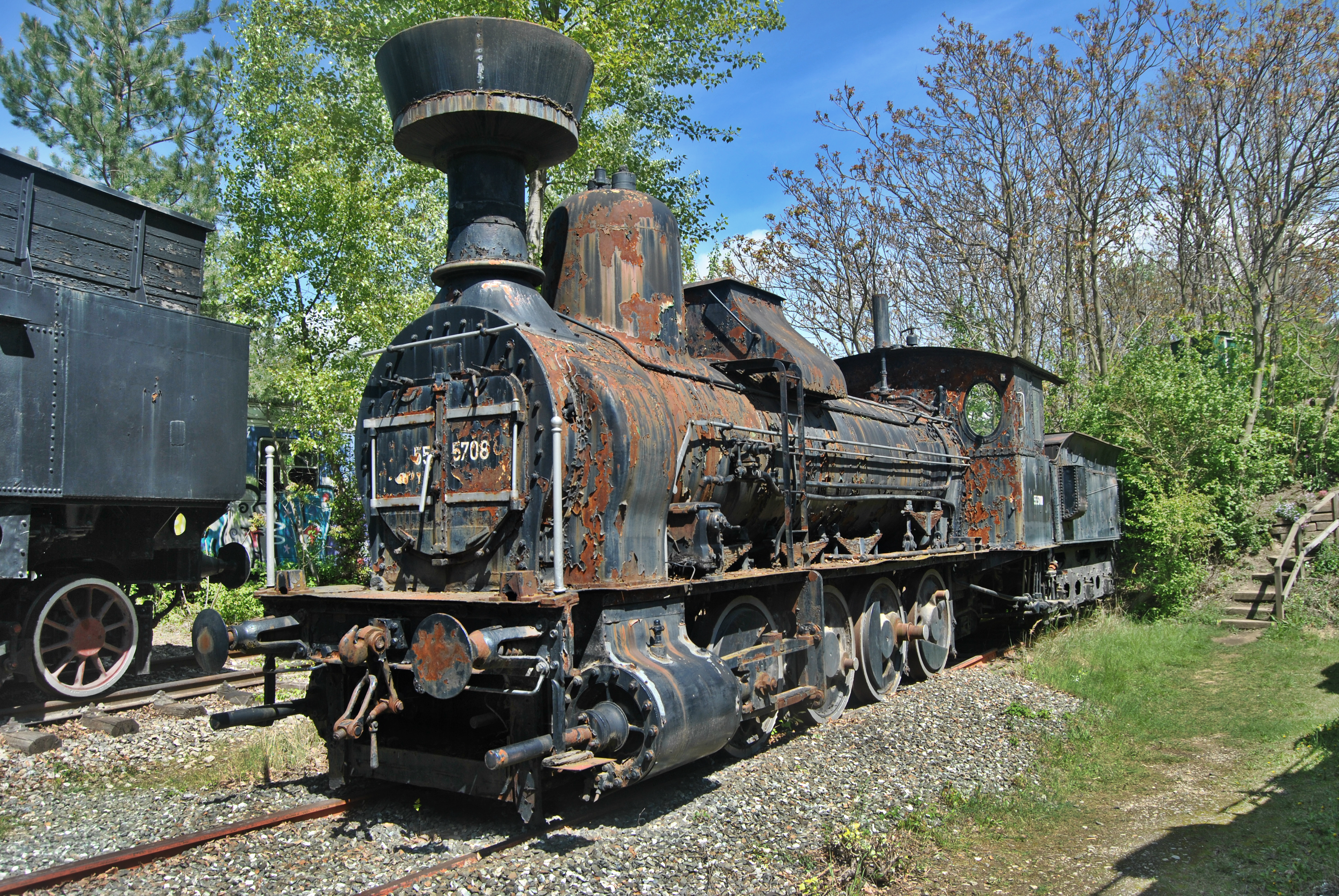
- ÖBB 55.5708 (ex kkStB 73.79) at Strasshof railway museum, May 2017
Type and origin
- Builder: Wiener Neustädter Lokomotivfabrik (86); Lokomotivfabrik Floridsdorf (194); Krauss (Linz) (17); Lokomotivfabrik der StEG (119); Böhmisch-Mährische Maschinenfabrik (37)
- Build date: 1885-1909
- Total produced: 453
Specifications
- Configuration
  - Whyte: 0-8-0
- Gauge: 1,435 mm (4 ft 8 1/2 in) standard gauge
- Driver dia.: 1,100 mm (3 ft 7 1/4 in)
- Wheelbase
  - Overall: 3,900 mm (12 ft 9 1/2 in)
  - incl. tender: 11,635 mm (38 ft 2 in)
- Length
  - Over beams: 16,477 mm (54 ft 3/4 in)
- Height: 4,550 mm (14 ft 11 1/8 in)
- Adhesive weight: 55.1 t (54.2 long tons; 60.7 short tons)
- Empty weight: 47.5 t (46.7 long tons; 52.4 short tons)
- Service weight: 55.1 t (54.2 long tons; 60.7 short tons)
- Boiler
- No. of heating tubes: 209
- Boiler pressure: 10 or 11 kgf/cm^{2} (981 or 1,080 kPa; 142 or 156 lbf/in^{2})
- Heating surface
  - Radiative: 11.20 m^{2} (120.6 sq ft)
  - Tubes: 170.80 m^{2} (1,838.5 sq ft)
- Cylinders: 2
- Cylinder size: 500 mm (19 11/16 in)
- Piston stroke: 570 mm (22 7/16 in)
Performance figures
- Maximum speed: 35 km/h (22 mph)

The kkStB 73 were a class of 0-8-0 steam locomotives of operated by the Imperial Royal Austrian State Railways (kaiserlich-königliche österreichische Staatsbahnen, k.k.St.B.), for freight duties.

== History ==
The kkStB procured these eight-coupled locomotives from 1885 to 1909. The first machines (73.01-73.04) were procured for the Arlberg Railway, the 73.23-73.28 for the Galician Transversal Railway. All five Austrian locomotive factories were involved in the delivery of the 73 class. A total of 453 locomotives were added to the kkStB inventory. They had the numbers 73.01–73.454 (the number 73.300 was not used).

The 73-class locomotives were very powerful in their day and shaped freight transport in what was then Austria for 25 years. They could haul 1,650 tonnes (1,620 long tons; 1,820 short tons) at 30 km/h (19 mph) on the level, 580 tonnes (570 long tons; 640 short tons) at 15 km/h (9 mph) on a 10‰ (1% or 1 in 100) gradient and 220 tonnes (220 long tons; 240 short tons) at 15 km/h (9 mph) on a 25‰ (2.5% or 1 in 40) gradient. Their power was 700 PS (515 kW; 690 hp).

The 73 series was mainly used in Galicia, Bukovina, Bohemia and Moravia, Vienna, Salzburg, Tyrol and Vorarlberg. After it had been displaced from freight traffic by more powerful locomotives (classes 170, 270, 180, 80), it was reused for shunting service.

After the First World War, the 73 class was divided among the successor states of the monarchy as follows: 233 locomotives went to the Polish State Railways (PKP) as class Tp15, 119 to the Czechoslovak State Railways (ČSD) as class 414.0, 25 to the Ferrovie dello Stato (FS) as class 424, 17 to the Romanian State Railways (CFR) and four units the railways of the Kingdom of Serbs, Croats and Slovenes and later as series 133 to the Yugoslav Railways (JDŽ). The Bundesbahn Österreich (BBÖ) retained 44 locomotives, the rest having been lost in the war. The ČSD withdrew the last machine of the 414.0 series from their inventory in 1969 and handed it over to the National Technical Museum in Prague.

After the Anschluss of Austria by the German Reich, the Deutsche Reichsbahn classified all 44 BBÖ machines as 55 5701 − 55 5744. In the course of the fighting during the Second World War, former 73s came to the DR from the ČSD (55 5745 − 55 5819), the PKP (55 5832 − 55 5864 and 55 5866 – 55 5897) and the JDŽ (55 5865).

After the Second World War, the ÖBB retained 38 locomotives, which were classified as class 55. The last machine, 55.5708 (kkStB 73.79), was taken out of service in 1964 and given to the collection of the Austrian Railway Museum. The locomotive is coupled to a tender from the kkStB tender class 36 in the Heizhaus railway museum, Strasshof an der Nordbahn.

The ČSD locomotive 414.096, the last example of this series in use in the Czech Republic, which was nicknamed "Heligon", has been subjected to a general inspection in the Lužná u Rakovníka Railway Museum since 2009. In April 2019 she drove on her own for the first time in 50 years and hauled several nostalgic trains in the following season.

The last Yugoslav machine, the former kkStB 73.372, is in the Slovenian Railway Museum in Ljubljana together with a tender for oil firing.
