= KkStB 229 =

Class of Austrian 2-6-2T locomotives

Südbahn 229 · kkStB 229 · EWA IIIa BBÖ 229 · ČSD 354.0 · FS 912 JDŽ 116 · PKP OKl12 · MÁV 343 ÖBB 75 · ČSD 354.05
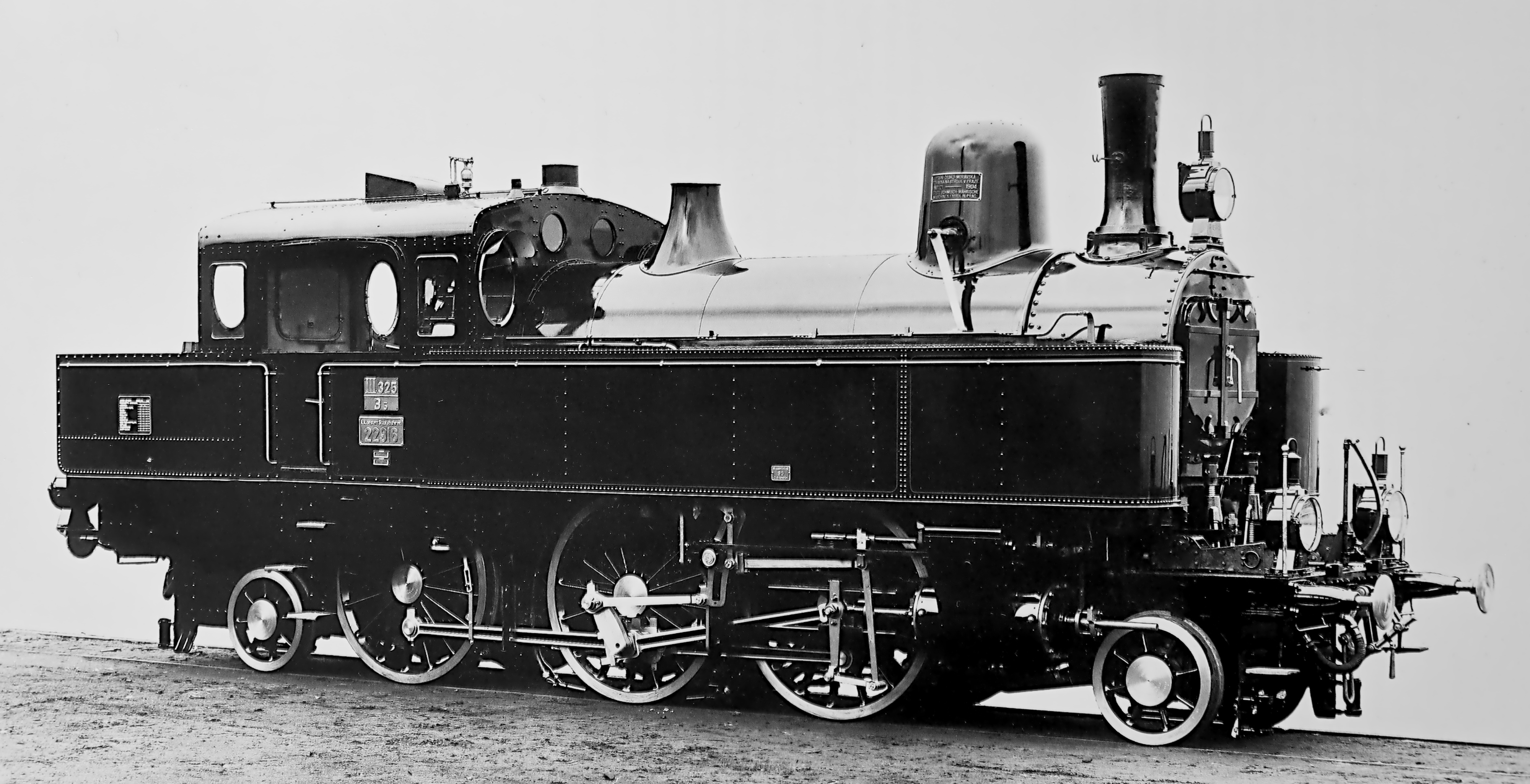
- Works photo of kkStB 229.16 (BMMF 121 of 1904)
Type and origin
- Builder: Wiener Neustädter Lokomotivfabrik; Lokomotivfabrik Floridsdorf; Lokomotivfabrik der StEG; Böhmisch-Mährische Maschinenfabrik; Krauss/Linz
- Build date: 1904–1918
- Total produced: kkStB 229: 239; kkStB 229.4: 17 (rebuild from kkStB 129); SB: 11; EWA: 10; BBÖ: 229: 69 (ex-kkStB); BBÖ: 229.4: 5 (ex-kkStB); BBÖ: 229.5: 11 (ex-SB); BBÖ: 229.8: 10 (ex-EWA); ČSD: 145 (ex-kkStB); FS: 5 (ex-kkStB); JDŽ: 25 (ex-kkStB); PKP: 22 (ex-kkStB); MÁV: 15 (ex-ČSD); ÖBB: 63; ČSD 354.05: 5 (ex-BBÖ)
Specifications
- Configuration
  - Whyte: 2-6-2T
- Gauge: 1,435 mm (4 ft 8 1/2 in)
- Leading dia.: 870 mm (2 ft 10 1/4 in)
- Driver dia.: 1,614 mm (5 ft 3 1/2 in)
- Trailing dia.: 870 mm (2 ft 10 1/4 in)
- Wheelbase
  - Overall: 8,000 mm (26 ft 3 in)
- Length
  - Over beams: 11,766 mm (38 ft 7 1/4 in)
- Height: 4,568 mm (14 ft 11 7/8 in)
- Adhesive weight: 38.0 t (37.4 long tons; 41.9 short tons)
- Empty weight: 50.2 t (49.4 long tons; 55.3 short tons)
- Service weight: 67.1 t (66.0 long tons; 74.0 short tons)
- Fuel capacity: 3.1 t (3.1 long tons; 3.4 short tons) coal
- Water cap.: 9.8 m^{3} (350 cu ft)
- Boiler
- No. of heating tubes: 200
- Boiler pressure: 14 kgf/cm^{2} (1,370 kPa; 199 lbf/in^{2})
- Heating surface
  - Firebox: 2.00 m^{2} (21.5 sq ft)
  - Radiative: 9.40 m^{2} (101.2 sq ft)
  - Tubes: 87.00 m^{2} (936.5 sq ft)
- Cylinders: 2
- High-pressure cylinder: 420 mm (16 9/16 in)
- Low-pressure cylinder: 650 mm (25 9/16 in)
- Piston stroke: 720 mm (28 in)
Performance figures
- Maximum speed: 80 km/h (50 mph)
Career
- Numbers: kkStB: 229.01–229.239; kkStB: 229.401–229.417 (rebuilt from kkStB 129); SB: 229.01–229.11; EWA: 41–50; BBÖ: 229.04–229.239 (with gaps); BBÖ: 229.403–229.413 (with gaps); BBÖ: 229.501–511 (ex SB); BBÖ: 229.801–810 (ex EWA); ČSD: 354.001–354.0145; FS 912.001–912.005; JDŽ 116-01 – 116-25; PKP: OKl12-1 – OKl12-22; MÁV 343.301–343.315; ÖBB 75.701–75.764 (less 75.760); ČSD 354.0501–0504, 0506
- Retired: ÖBB: 1962; ČSD: 1967

The kkStB 229 was a class of passenger 2-6-2Ts with the Imperial Royal Austrian State Railways (k.k. österreichische Staatsbahnen), kkStB.

== History ==
In order to improve local passenger services the kkStB procured 1′C n2vt (2-6-0 saturated [n], 2-cylinder, compound [v] tank [t]) locomotives that were to replace the existing four-coupled tender locomotives in this role. One advantage of tank locomotives was that they did not need to be turned at the end of the route. In their design Karl Gölsdorf laid particular emphasis on good acceleration. The 17 engines of this class, designated as the kkStB 129 were delivered by the Lokomotivfabrik Floridsdorf and Wiener Neustädter Lokomotivfabrik.

Because these class 129 locomotives proved a total success, the Austrian Southern Railway Company (Südbahn) wanted to procured similar engines, albeit with greater water and coal capacity. As a result, Gölsdorf modified the design by adding a trailing axle. From 1903 to 1907 Floridsdorf supplied eleven units of this newly designated Class 229 to the Südbahn, and from 1904 to 1918 the kkStB placed orders for a total of 239 units with all the Austrian locomotive factories. The class 129 engines were rebuilt to 2-6-2T locomotives and placed into a new class 229.4. In 1913 the Böhmisch-Mährische Maschinenfabrik delivered four 229s to the Serbian State Railway and the Wiener Neustädter Lokomotivfabrik built 10 units in 1909 and 1920 for the Aspangbahn (Eisenbahn Wien-Aspang, EWA), that were designated as the EWA IIIa Nos. 41–50.

After World War I, 69 engines were left with the Bundesbahnen Österreich (BBÖ), to which were added the eleven engines of the Südbahn, grouped into Class 229.5, and ten machines of the EWA, grouped into Class 229.8, when these companies were nationalised. With the break-up of the Austro-Hungarian Empire, other nations also acquired these locomotives giving them their own classifications. The Polish State Railways took had 22 locomotives as PKP Class OKl12, the Yugoslavian Railways acquired 25 as JDŽ Class 116 and the Italian State Railways (FS) had five as FS Class 912. But the bulk of the engines (145 units) went in 1918 to the Czechoslovak State Railways, who designated them as ČSD Class 354.0. As southern Slovakia was ceded in 1939 to Hungary, 15 units also went to the Hungarian State Railways (Magyar Államvasutak, MÁV) as the MÁV Class 343.3.

From 1926 to 1934 the ČSD rebuilt five of its 354.0 into superheated two-cylinder simple locomotives which they designated as the ČSD Class 355.0. These machines were also given a second steam dome and a connecting pipe between the domes. Between 1936 and 1940, the trailing axle on another five engines was replaced by a bogie; these locomotives then became the ČSD Class 353.1. In 1944 another engine was converted to superheating, but the second steam dome was not used.

After the Anschluss of Austria by the German Empire in 1938, the ninety 229s were classified by the Deutsche Reichsbahn as DRB Class 75 701 – 75 790. During the course of the war, the ČSD Class 355.0 was incorporated as DRB Class 75 901 – 75 905 into the DRB; likewise 21 PKP Class OKl12 locomotives as DR Class 75 851 – 75 871 and nine JDŽ Class 116s as DR Class 75 791 – 75 799.

After 1945, some 63 engines were grouped by the ÖBB into their ÖBB Class 75. The last of these machines were retired in 1962.

The former 229.137, 178, 187, 405 and 115 went into the ČSD as numbers 354.0501–354.0504 and 354.0506. The ČSD Class 354.0 was in service until 1967.

Several former 229s also went into the JDŽ and PKP.

Apart from normal use, at least 11 Polish locomotives were armoured in Poland and used in armoured trains during the Polish-Soviet War.

== See also ==
- Deutsche Reichsbahn
- List of DRG locomotives and railbuses
