= SStB – Gutenberg =

SStB Gutenberg
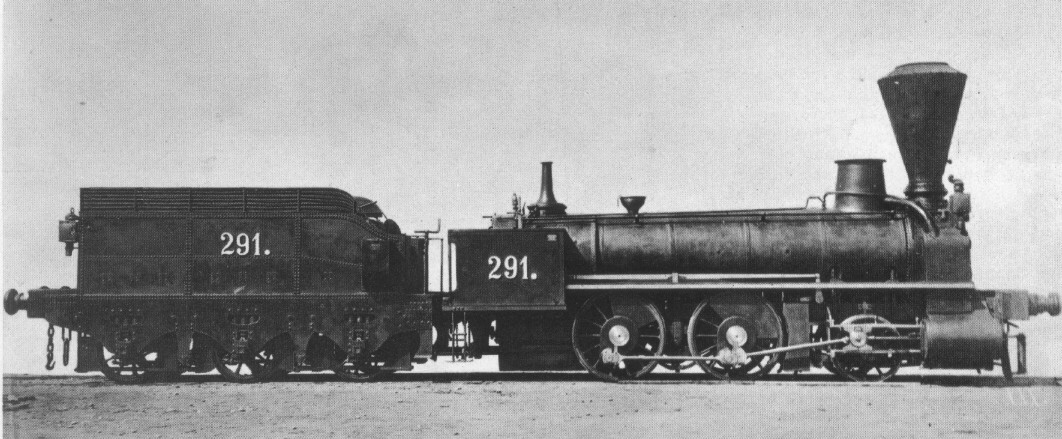
- SB class 12 steam locomotives Nº 291
Type and origin
- Power type: Steam
- Builder: Georg Sigl, Vienna
- Build date: 1857
- Total produced: 1
Specifications
- Configuration
  - Whyte: 2-4-0
  - UIC: 1B n2
- Gauge: 1,435 mm (4 ft 8 1/2 in)
- Driver dia.: 1.422 m (55.98 in)
- Adhesive weight: 20.3 t (20.0 long tons; 22.4 short tons)
- Loco weight: 28.4 t (28.0 long tons; 31.3 short tons)
- Boiler pressure: 6.5 atm (660 kPa; 96 psi)
- Heating surface: 121.0 m^{2} (1,302 sq ft)
- Cylinders: Two, outside
- Cylinder size: 409 mm × 579 mm (16.10 in × 22.80 in)
Performance figures
- Tractive effort: 85%: 38.32 kN (8,615 lbf)
Career
- Operators: SStB » SB
- Class: 12, later 17
- Numbers: 291
- Withdrawn: 1880

The SStB - Gutenberg was a steam locomotive of the Südlichen Staatsbahn (SStB) or Southern National Railway of Austria-Hungary.

The locomotive was the last one ordered by the SStB. It was supplied by Georg Sigl in Vienna in 1857, and was the first locomotive he produced. The name Gutenberg refers to Johannes Gutenberg and results from the fact that Sigl originally built printing machines.

The locomotive was built in 1858 during the course of the privatization of Austrian national railways to the Südbahngesellschaft (SB) or Austrian Southern Railway, which assigned it the number 291 and the class number 12 (starting from 1864, class 17). It was retired from service in 1880.
