= Empress Elisabeth Railway =

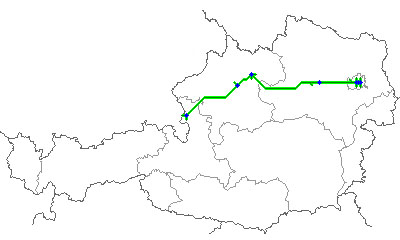
Westbahn line from Salzburg to Vienna. The extension to Passau is not included.

The Empress Elisabeth Railway (German: Kaiserin Elisabeth-Bahn, KEB) was the name of a former railway company during the time of the Austro-Hungarian monarchy. Its rail network was centred on the Western Railway line from Vienna to Salzburg with a branch to Passau. The company was nationalised by the Imperial Royal Austrian State Railways in 1884.

== History ==
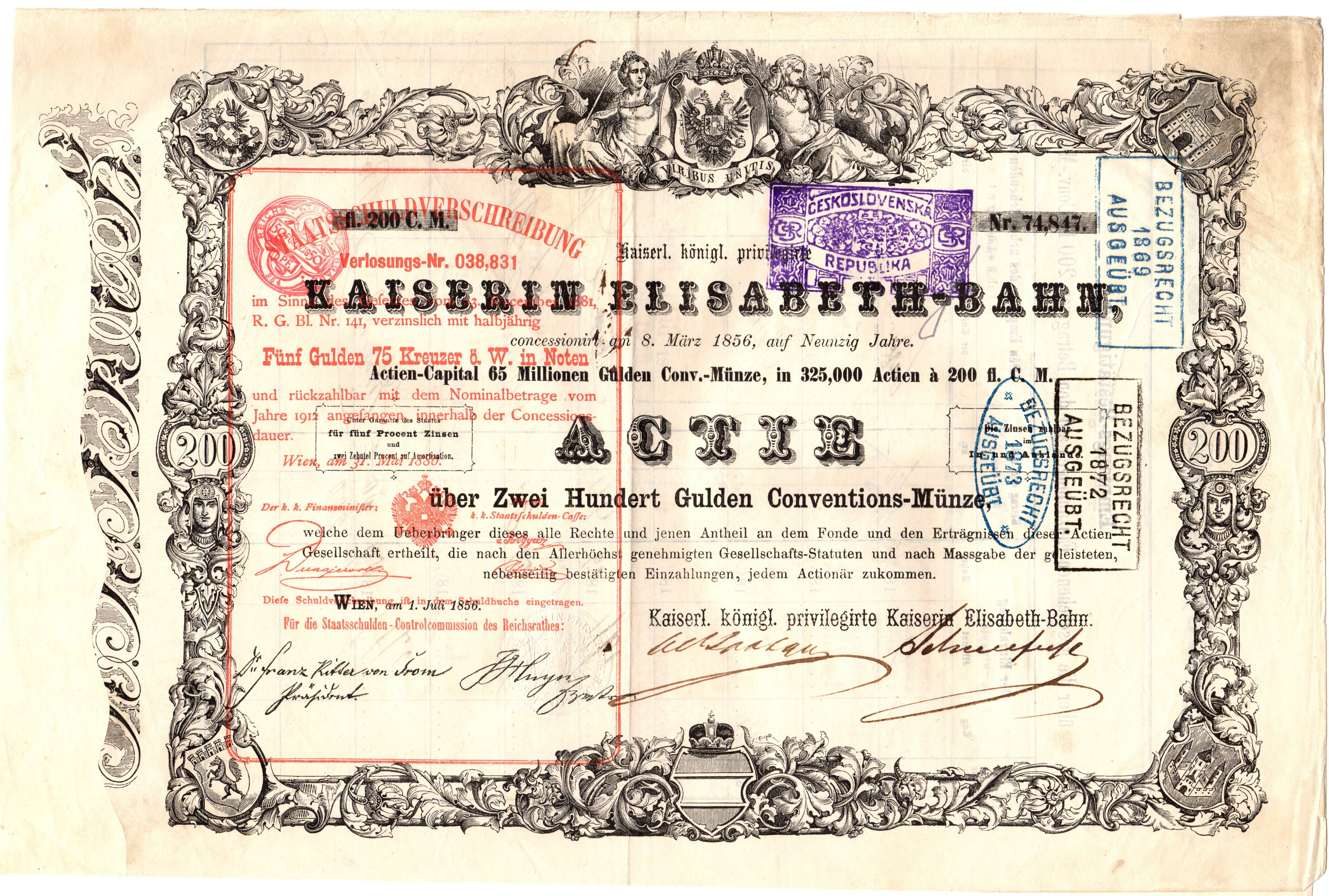
Share of the Empress Elisabeth Railway (Kaiserin Elisabeth-Bahn), issued 1 July 1856

On 21 June 1851 the Austrian Empire and the Kingdom of Bavaria signed a treaty to build a railway line from Vienna via Salzburg to Munich, and also agreed upon an extension from Rosenheim via Kufstein to Innsbruck as well as the continuation of the railroad from Nuremberg via Regensburg and Passau to Linz. First plans were set up at the behest of the industrialist Hermann Dietrich Lindheim (1790–1860), who together with the German businessman Ernst Merck (1811–1863) founded the Kaiserin Elisabeth-Bahn railway company, named after Empress Elisabeth of Austria.

Funded by Salomon Mayer von Rothschild (1774 –1855) and his Creditanstalt, the k.k. privilegierte Kaiserin-Elisabeth-Bahn was changed into a public limited company in 1856. A second state treaty between Austria and Bavaria fixed the line from Vienna to Linz, which was built between 1856 and 1858, and the extensions from Linz to Salzburg and Passau, opened in 1860 and 1861. The KEB was awarded a 90-year-licence to build and operate the railway

The company was nationalized in 1884 and is today operated by the Austrian Federal Railways.

== The line today ==
Since World War I, the former Gisela Railway from Salzburg via Zell am See to Wörgl, the North Tyrolean Railway (Kufstein-Innsbruck, operated by the Austrian Southern Railway until 1923) and the Arlberg railway have been understood as part of the Western Railway. Vienna West Station was heavily damaged in World War II and reconstructed until 1952, when the railway had been equipped with electrical power lines.

Today, ICE trains and Austrian Railjet (ÖBB Railjet description) trains run on it, but most time below 200 km/h. The railway is being upgraded and partially rebuilt, and will partly allow speeds up to 230 km/h.

== In numismatics ==
Empress Elisabeth Western Railway was recently selected as a main motif for a high value collectors' coin: the Empress Elisabeth Western Railway commemorative coin. The obverse shows the steam locomotive kkStB 306.01 crossing a railroad bridge on the Austrian Western Railway path. The locomotive was developed by Karl Gölsdorf in 1908.
