= KkStB 429 =

Class of 283 Austrian 2-6-2 locomotives

kkStB 429/429.1 · Südbahn 429 BBÖ 429/429.1 · ČSD 354.7 · FS 688 JDŽ 106 · PKP Ol12 · MÁV 323.9 DRB 35.3 ÖBB 35 · ÖBB 135
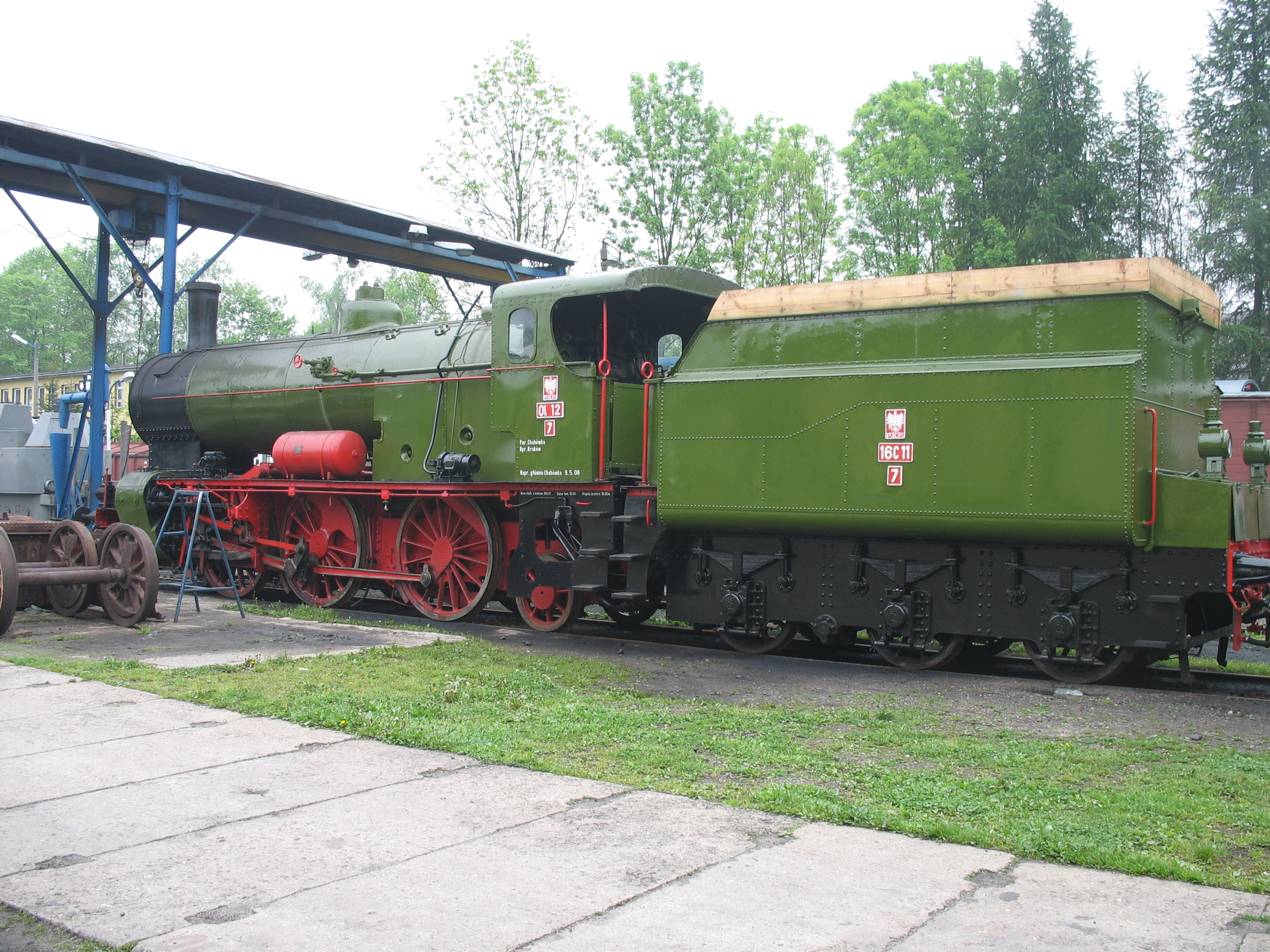
- PKP Ol12-7 (former kkStB 429.195)
Type and origin
- Builder: Lokomotivfabrik der StEG; Wiener Neustädter Lokomotivfabrik; Lokomotivfabrik Floridsdorf; Böhmisch-Mährische Maschinenfabrik
- Build date: 1909–1916
- Total produced: 283
Specifications
- Configuration
  - Whyte: 2-6-2
  - UIC: 1′C1′ h2v
- Gauge: 1,435 mm (4 ft 8 1/2 in)
- Leading dia.: 870 mm (34 1/4 in)
- Driver dia.: 1,614 mm (63 1/2 in)
- Trailing dia.: 870 mm (34 1/4 in)
- Wheelbase
  - Overall: 8,030 mm (26 ft 4 1/4 in)
  - incl. tender: 13,796 mm (45 ft 3 1/4 in)
- Height: 4,650 mm (15 ft 3 1/8 in)
- Adhesive weight: 43.0 t (42.3 long tons; 47.4 short tons)
- Empty weight: 55.1 t (54.2 long tons; 60.7 short tons)
- Service weight: 61.2 t (60.2 long tons; 67.5 short tons)
- Boiler
- No. of heating tubes: 170
- Boiler pressure: 15 kgf/cm^{2} (1,470 kPa; 213 lbf/in^{2})
- Heating surface
  - Firebox: 3.00 m^{2} (32.3 sq ft)
  - Radiative: 14.20 m^{2} (152.8 sq ft)
  - Tubes: 85.60 m^{2} (921.4 sq ft)
- Superheater
  - Heating area: 28.25 m^{2} (304.1 sq ft)
- Cylinders: 2
- High-pressure cylinder: 475 mm (18 11/16 in)
- Low-pressure cylinder: 690 mm (27 3/16 in)
- Piston stroke: 720 mm (28 3/8 in)
Performance figures
- Maximum speed: 80 km/h (50 mph)
Career
- Numbers: kkStB: 429.01–429.57; kkStB: 429.100–429.225; SB 429.01–429.06; BBÖ: 429.03–429.57 (with gaps); BBÖ: 429.103–429.224; ČSD: 354.701–354.784; FS: 688.001–688.002; JDŽ: 106-001 – 106-002; PKP: Ol12-1 – Ol12–45, Ol12-84; MÁV: 323.907; DRB: 35 301 – 35 346; ÖBB: 35.242; ÖBB: 135.312–135.346 (with gaps)

kkStB 429.9 BBÖ 429.9 / ČSD 354.7 / FS 688 / JDŽ 106 / PKP Ol12 DRB 35.2 ÖBB 35
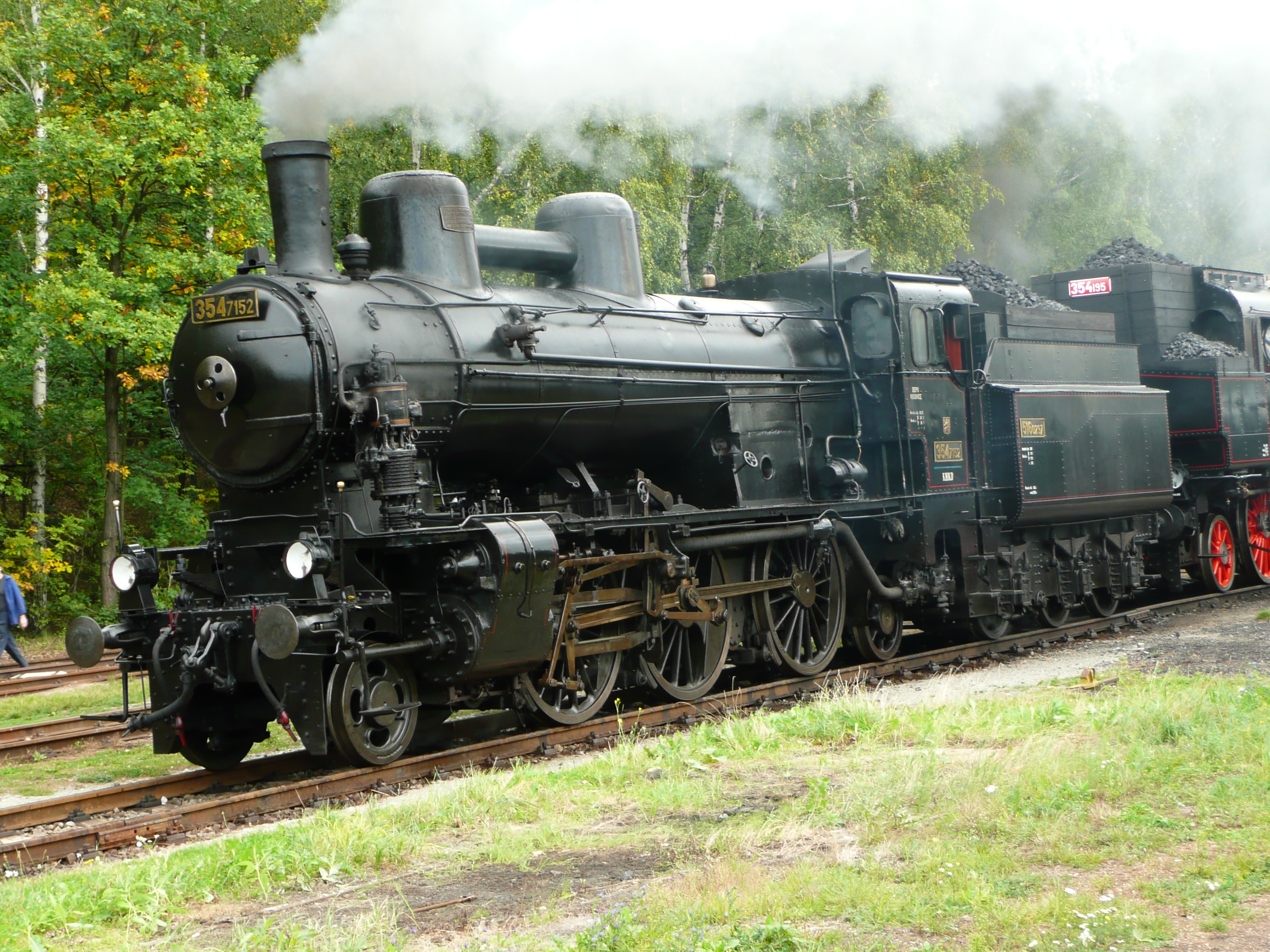
- ČSD 354.7152 (ex kkStB 429.1996) in the Luzna Railway Museum in 2008
Type and origin
- Builder: Lokomotivfabrik Floridsdorf; Böhmisch-Mährische Maschinenfabrik; Wiener Neustädter Lokomotivfabrik; Lokomotivfabrik der StEG
- Build date: 1911–1918
- Total produced: 197
Specifications
- Configuration
  - Whyte: 2-6-2
  - UIC: 1′C1′ h2
- Gauge: 1,435 mm (4 ft 8 1/2 in)
- Leading dia.: 870 mm (34 1/4 in)
- Driver dia.: 1,614 mm (63 1/2 in)
- Trailing dia.: 870 mm (34 1/4 in)
- Wheelbase
  - Overall: 8,030 mm (26 ft 4 1/4 in)
  - incl. tender: 13,844 mm (45 ft 5 in)
- Length: 10,548 mm (34 ft 7 1/4 in)
- Height: 4,650 mm (15 ft 3 1/8 in)
- Adhesive weight: 43.0 t (42.3 long tons; 47.4 short tons)
- Empty weight: 55.1 t (54.2 long tons; 60.7 short tons)
- Service weight: 61.2 t (60.2 long tons; 67.5 short tons)
- Boiler
- No. of heating tubes: 170
- Boiler pressure: 15 kgf/cm^{2} (1,470 kPa; 213 lbf/in^{2})
- Heating surface
  - Firebox: 3.00 m^{2} (32.3 sq ft)
  - Radiative: 14.20 m^{2} (152.8 sq ft)
  - Tubes: 85.60 m^{2} (921.4 sq ft)
- Superheater
  - Heating area: 28.25 m^{2} (304.1 sq ft)
- Cylinders: 2
- Cylinder size: 475 mm (18 11/16 in)
- Piston stroke: 720 mm (28 3/8 in)
Performance figures
- Maximum speed: 80 km/h (50 mph)
Career
- Numbers: kkStB: 429.900–429.999, 429.1900–429.1996; BBÖ: 429.902–429.995, 429.1926–429.1987, 429.1997 (with gaps); ČSD: 354.785–354.799, 354.7100–354.7152; FS: 688.003–688.028; JDŽ: 106-003; PKP Ol12-46 – Ol12–83, Ol12-85 – Ol12-106; DR: 35 201 – 35 241; ÖBB 35.201–35.241 (with gaps)

The steam locomotive class kkStB 429 was a class of passenger locomotive operated by the Imperial Royal Austrian State Railways (Kaiserlich-königliche österreichische Staatsbahnen), kkStB.

As Wilhelm Schmidt's superheater went into series production, Karl Gölsdorf modified the Class 329 into the superheated variant 429. The smokebox was lengthened, the boiler barrel reduced accordingly, high-pressure cylinder was given piston valves, the low-pressure cylinder slide valves. The Lokomotivfabrik Floridsdorf, the Wiener Neustädter Lokomotivfabrik and the Lokomotivfabrik der StEG delivered 57 units (429.01–429.57) to the kkStB.

In spite of the small superheater area, problems arose with the slide valve on the low-pressure side. As a result, the following 126 engines were supplied with piston valves on both sides (429.100–429.225). At the same time a two-cylinder simple variant with piston valves was tried, of which in the end 197 units were procured by the kkStB (429.900–429.999 and 429.1900–429.1996).

The Austrian Southern Railway Company (Südbahn) procured six compound locomotives (with piston valves), that were numbered 429.01–429.06.

The 429s were employed for all duties and with good coal generated up to 1,200 PS (883 kW; 1,180 hp). They were to be found in almost all parts of the Danube Monarchy.

After the First World War the former 429s became Class 354.7 with the ČSD, Class Ol12 in the PKP, Class 106 in the JDŽ, Class 688 in the FS and were also used by the Romanian State Railways retaining their original numbers. A total of 87 units (46 compound, 41 two-cylinder locomotives) remained in the BBÖ. The six Südbahn locomotives came to the MÁV, which gave them the designation 323.901–323.906. In addition, the ex kkStB 429.116, which had gone to the PKP as Ol12-24, went to the MÁV as 323.907, the number of which was later changed to 323.908.

In 1939 the Deutsche Reichsbahn (DRB) reclassified the simple engines as 35 201 – 35 241 and the compounds as 35 301 – 35 346. During the course of the war, several locomotives from the ČSD and JDŽ ended up in the DRB. After the Second World War 46 simple locomotives were left in the ÖBB and became their Class 35, as well as 39 compound engines which became Class 135. The serial numbers were not changed from those allocated by the DRB.

== ČSD Class 354.7 ==
The ČSD in Czechoslovakia converted all its compound locomotives (27 of the first series, 57 of the second) into two-cylinder engines. Together with the 68 two-cylinder machines taken over, they therefore had over 152 examples of Class 354.7. With the exception of one engine, all the locomotives were give a second steam dome with a connecting pipe. The ČSD did not withdraw Class 354.7 engines from its fleet until 1967.
