= Georg Sigl =

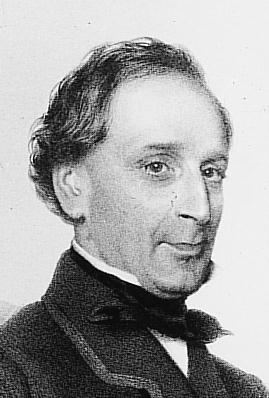
Georg Sigl in 1862

Georg Sigl (13 January 1811, Breitenfurt bei Wien - 9 May 1887, Vienna) was an Austrian mechanical engineer and entrepreneur.

== Life ==
Sigl studied to be a locksmith, but later moved to Berlin where, in 1844, he established a small factory for the construction of printing presses. In 1846, he founded a second factory in Vienna.

In 1851, he moved the company to Währinger Straße (then on the outskirts of the city), where he manufactured steam locomotives such as the SStB – Gutenberg. In the early 1870s, he produced the first compaction-free, two-stroke locomotive engines, designed by automotive pioneer Siegfried Marcus. In 1861, he leased the Wiener Neustädter Lokomotivfabrik from the Creditanstalt and, by 1867, was its owner. It became the largest factory of its kind in the Empire and, by 1870, had produced its 1000th locomotive.

In addition to the locomotive trade, his factories also produced oil presses, marine engines, architectural support structures and equipment for amusement park rides. In 1872, he introduced the "Straßenlokomotive" (road locomotive), that looked like a steam roller and was put to use as a tow truck.

During the Panic of 1873, Sigl lost all of his holdings except his original Vienna factory. The Wiener Neustädter Lokomotivfabrik became a public company.

== Honors ==
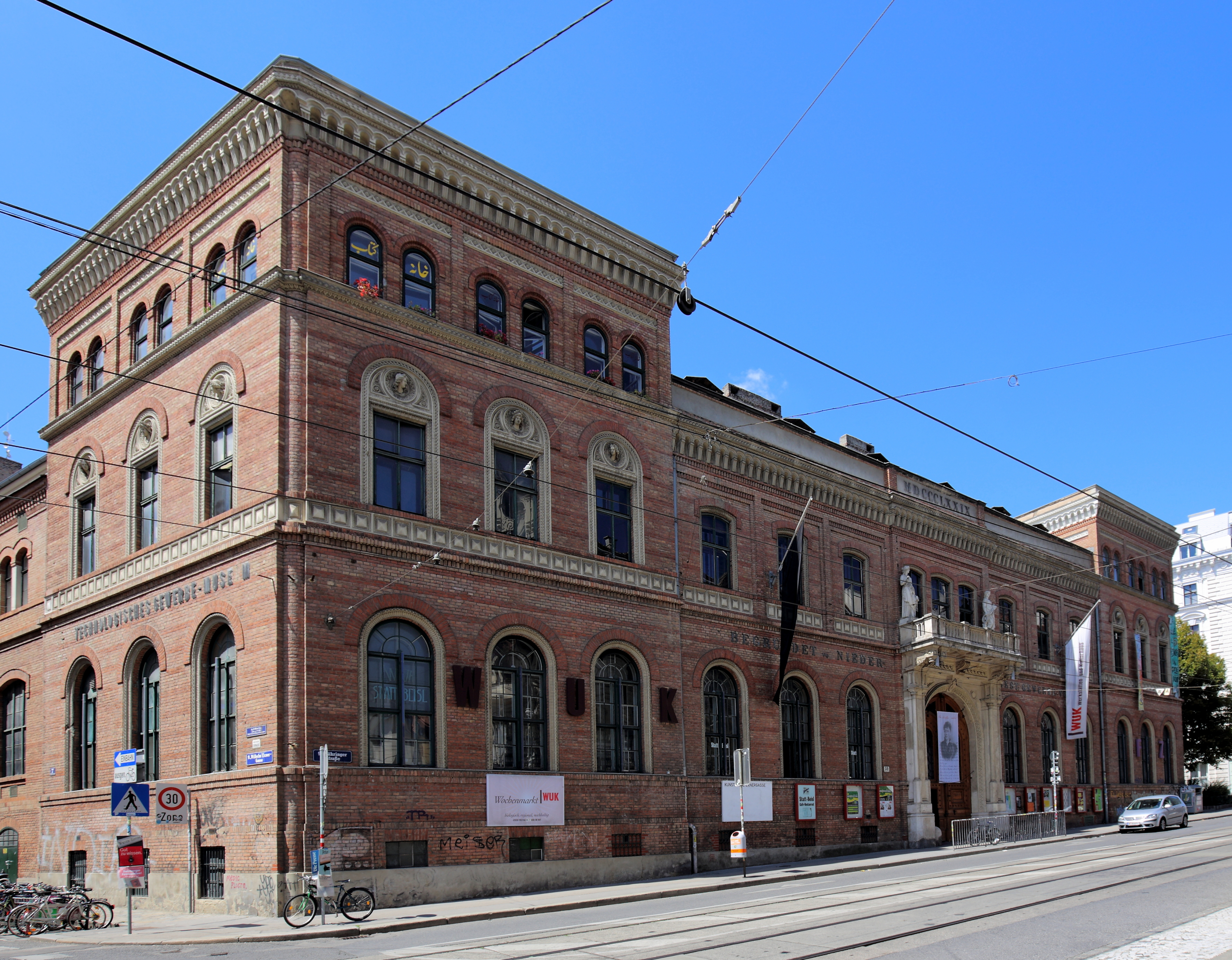
The factory on Währinger Straße (designed by Carl Tietz), now home to the Werkstätten- und Kulturhaus

- On 11 February 1870, he became an Honorary Citizen of Vienna.
- In 1888, a street in Alsergrund was renamed the Georg-Sigl-Gasse.
- In 2011, the Österreichische Post issued a commemorative stamp for his 200th birthday.

== Sources ==
- Karl Gölsdorf: Lokomotivbau in Alt-Österreich. 1837–1918. Verlag Slezak, Wien 1978, ISBN 3-900134-40-5 (Schriftenreihe internationales Archiv für Lokomotivgeschichte 26).
- B. Köfler-Tockner – J. Mentschl: "Sigl Georg". In: Österreichisches Biographisches Lexikon 1815–1950 (ÖBL). Vol. 12, Austrian Academy of Sciences, Vienna 2005, ISBN 3-7001-3580-7, p. 252 f. (Direct links to "p. 252", "p. 253")
- Dietmar Hübsch u. a.: Georg Sigl und seine Gasse in Wien-Alsergrund. Festschrift vom 120. Todesjahr. Bezirksmuseum Alsergrund, Wien 2007, ISBN 3-902140-04-6.
