= Komárek =

Komárek (feminine: Komárková) is a Czech surname. It is a diminutive of the word komár (meaning 'mosquito') and the surname Komár. Notable people with the surname include:

- Božena Komárková (1903–1997), Czech philosopher and theologian
- Jaroslava Komárková (1927–2010), Czech athlete
- Josef Komarek (born 1992), American musician
- Karel Komárek (born 1969), Czech businessman
- Konstantin Komarek (born 1992), Austrian ice hockey player
- Lukáš Komárek (born 1982), Slovak ice hockey player
- Martin Komárek (born 1984), Czech footballer
- Miroslav Komárek (1924–2013), Czech linguist
- Valtr Komárek (1930–2013), Czech politician
- Vera Komarkova (1942–2005), Czech-American mountaineer
