= BNB VIb =

BNB VIb kkStB 265 ČSD 312.7
Type and origin
- Builder: Erste Böhmisch-Mährische Maschinenfabrik, Prague
- Build date: 1907
- Total produced: 2
Specifications
- Configuration
  - Whyte: 0-6-2T
- Gauge: 1,435 mm (4 ft 8 1/2 in) standard gauge
- Driver dia.: 930 mm (36 5/8 in)
- Carrying wheel diameter: 840 mm (33 1/8 in)
- Wheelbase
  - Overall: 4,800 mm (15 ft 9 in)
- Length
  - Over beams: 9,836 mm (32 ft 3 1/4 in)
- Adhesive weight: 35.2 t (5.1 long tons; 5.7 short tons)
- Empty weight: 32.3 t (31.8 long tons; 35.6 short tons)
- Service weight: 44.6 t (43.9 long tons; 49.2 short tons)
- Fuel capacity: 4.7 m^{3} (170 cu ft) of coal
- Water cap.: 7.0 m^{3} (1,500 imp gal; 1,800 US gal)
- Boiler
- No. of heating tubes: 192
- Boiler pressure: 12 kgf/cm^{2} (1,180 kPa; 171 lbf/in^{2})
- Heating surface
  - Firebox: 1.66 m^{2} (17.9 sq ft)
  - Radiative: 6.1 m^{2} (66 sq ft)
  - Tubes: 79.6 m^{2} (857 sq ft)
  - Evaporative: 85.7 m^{2} (922 sq ft)
- Cylinders: 2
- Cylinder size: 420 mm (16 9/16 in)
- Piston stroke: 480 mm (18 7/8 in)
- Loco brake: Vacuum brake
Performance figures
- Maximum speed: 45 km/h (28 mph)
- Indicated power: 352 PS (259 kW; 347 hp)
Career
- Numbers: BNB: 126, 127; kkStB: 265.01, 265.02; ČSD: 312.701, 312.702; DRB: 90 301, 90 302
- Retired: 1949

The BNB VIb (six-B) was a class of two branch line tank locomotives of the Bohemian Northern Railway Company (Böhmische Nordbahn-Gesellschaft) for use on the Česká Lípa–Kamenický Šenov railway line. They later passed to the Imperial Austrian State Railways, who classified them as kkStB 265.

The two locomotives were built in Prague in 1907 by the Erste Böhmisch-Mährische Maschinenfabrik (later part of ČKD).

The locomotives spent their entire lives on their home line. In 1924 the Czechoslovak State Railways (ČSD) grouped the engines into their ČSD Class 312.7. After the Second World War the Deutsche Reichsbahn gave them the designation DR Class 90.3.

On the introduction into service of new ČSD Class M 131.1 railcars, these locomotives were retired in 1949.

== See also ==
- List of DRG locomotives and railbuses
