= Lokomotivfabrik der StEG =

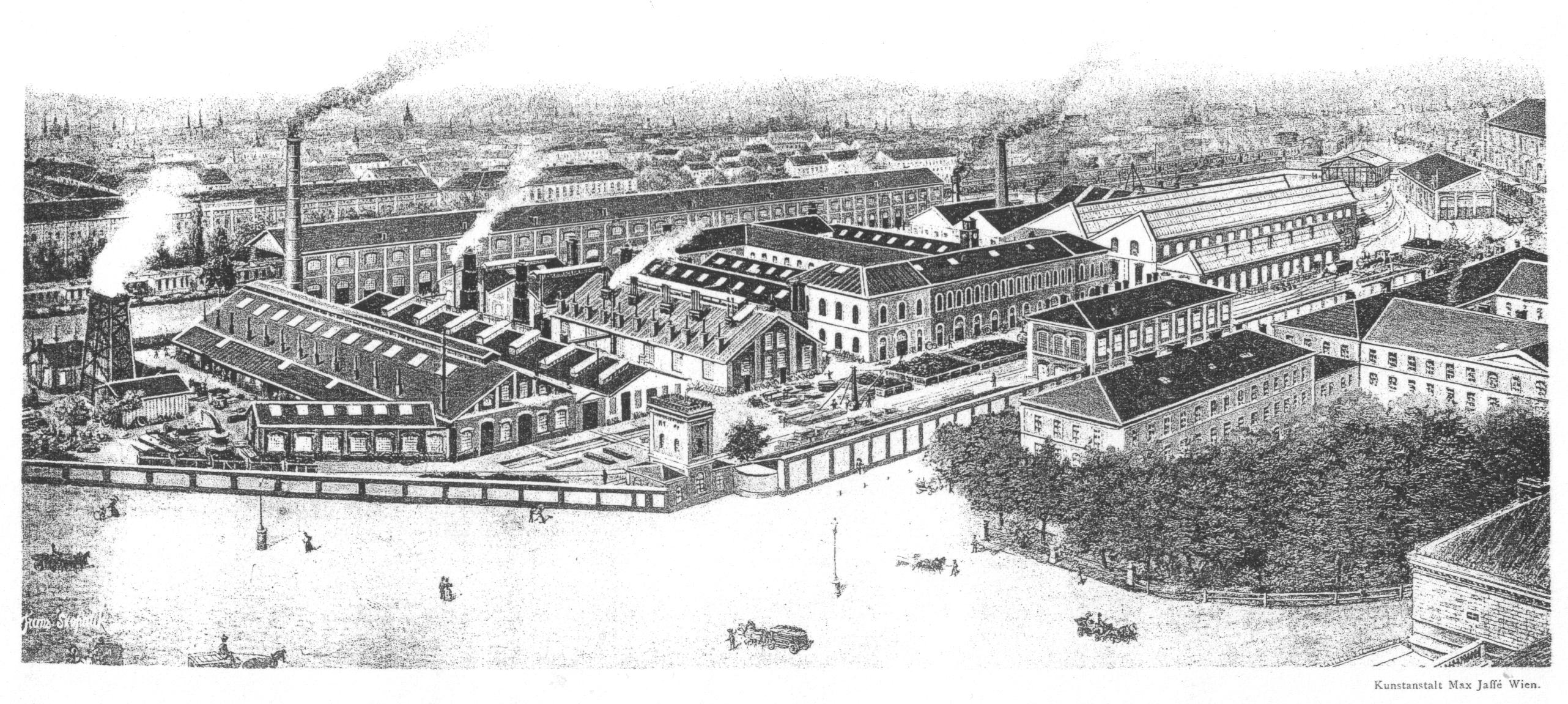
The StEG Factory in 1902

In 1839 the Lokomotivfabrik der StEG became the first Austrian locomotive works to be founded and it produced many influential locomotive designs.

The factory was built in 1839 by the Vienna-Raab Railway between the Vienna Südbahnhof and Vienna Ostbahnhof and stocked with machinery, much of which was from England. The first locomotives and coaches were built in 1840 based on American prototypes. These were also the first railway vehicles to be built in Austria. The manufacture of railway vehicles was difficult because at that time in Austria there were still no iron foundries and none of the workers had the training for this type of work.

One of the biggest influences on the development of locomotive construction in Austria was the first manager of the factory, John Haswell, who led it from 1840 to 1882.

In 1855, the factory went into the ownership of the Staats-Eisenbahn-Gesellschaft (State Railway Company) or StEG (full title: k.k. landesbefugte Maschinen-Fabrik in Wien der privilegirten österreichisch-ungarischen Staats-Eisenbahn-Gesellschaft), which had the factory expanded in size.

Amongst the trail-blazing locomotives, which this factory produced, was the first six-coupled locomotive on the continent, the FAHRAFELD, the Semmering competition engine, VINDOBONA, and the first eight-coupled locomotive, WIEN-RAAB.

The company runs a subsidiary today in Romania's Reşiţa. Until 1918, however only 7 steam engines were built there.

Due mainly to the consequences of the First World War, there was only a low demand for locomotives within the reduced Austrian national territory. This was able to be compensated for a time by orders from abroad, nevertheless in 1930 the factory had to shut its gates.

== Gallery ==
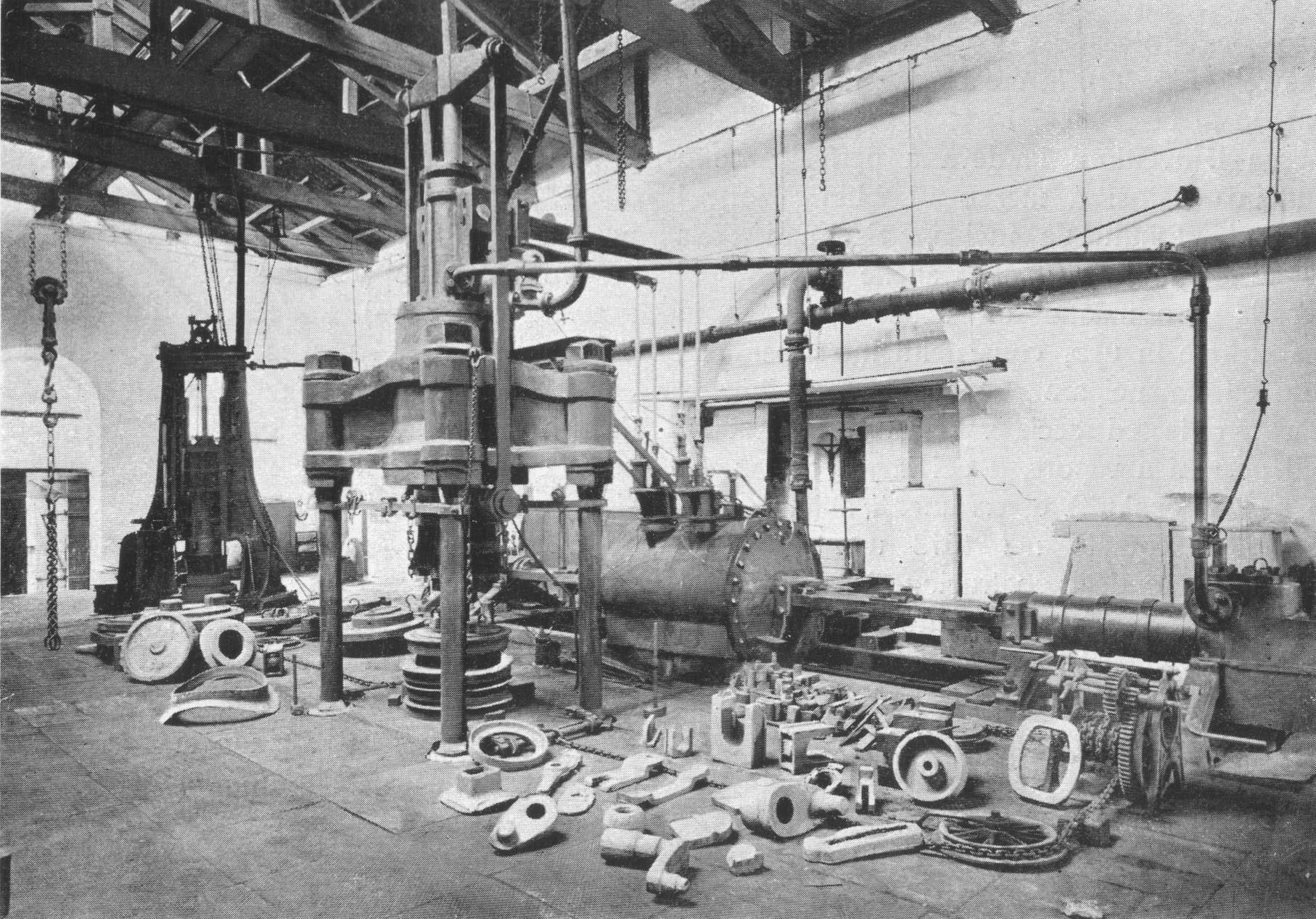
A press in the StEG factory in 1873

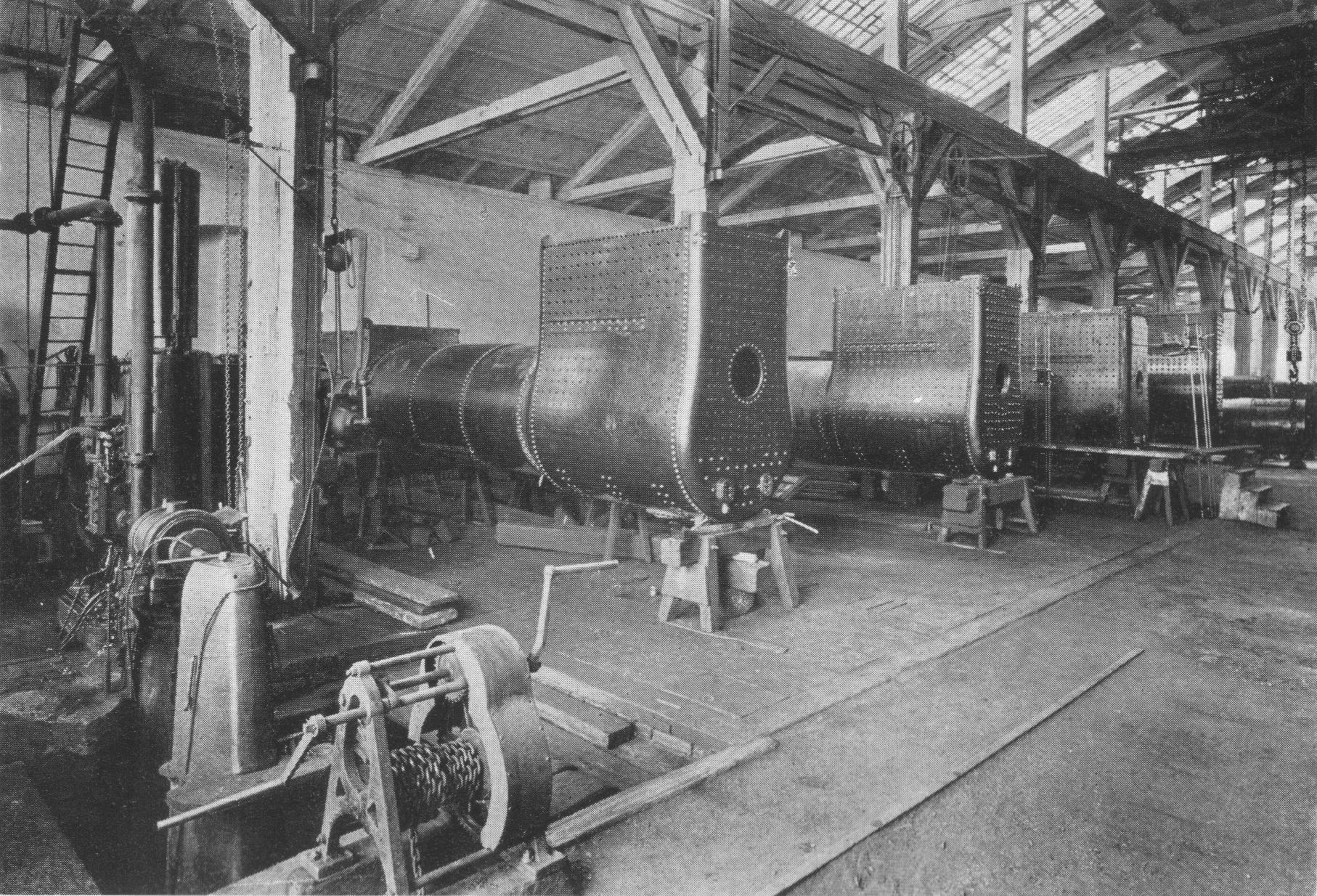
Boiler smithy

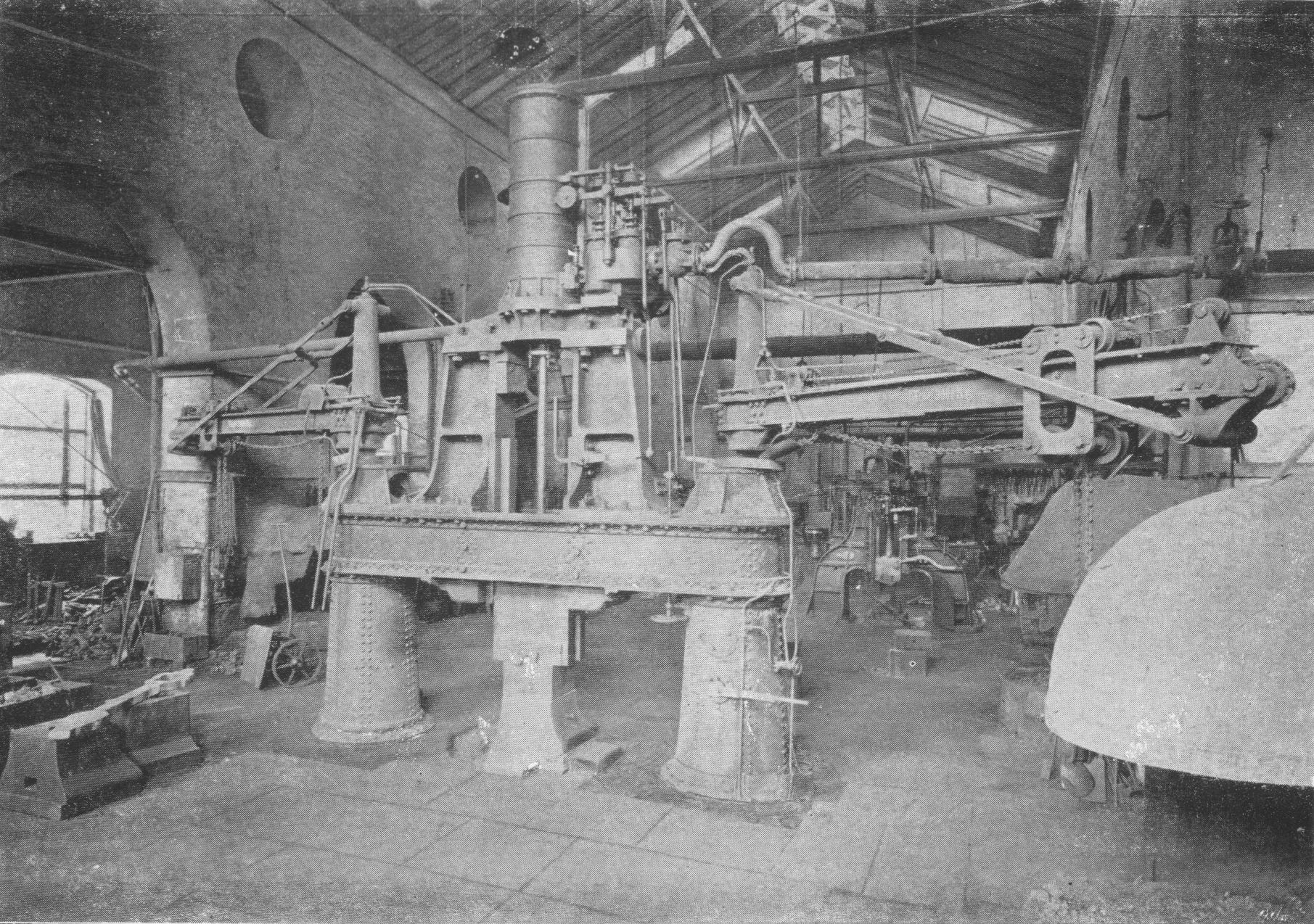
Smithy

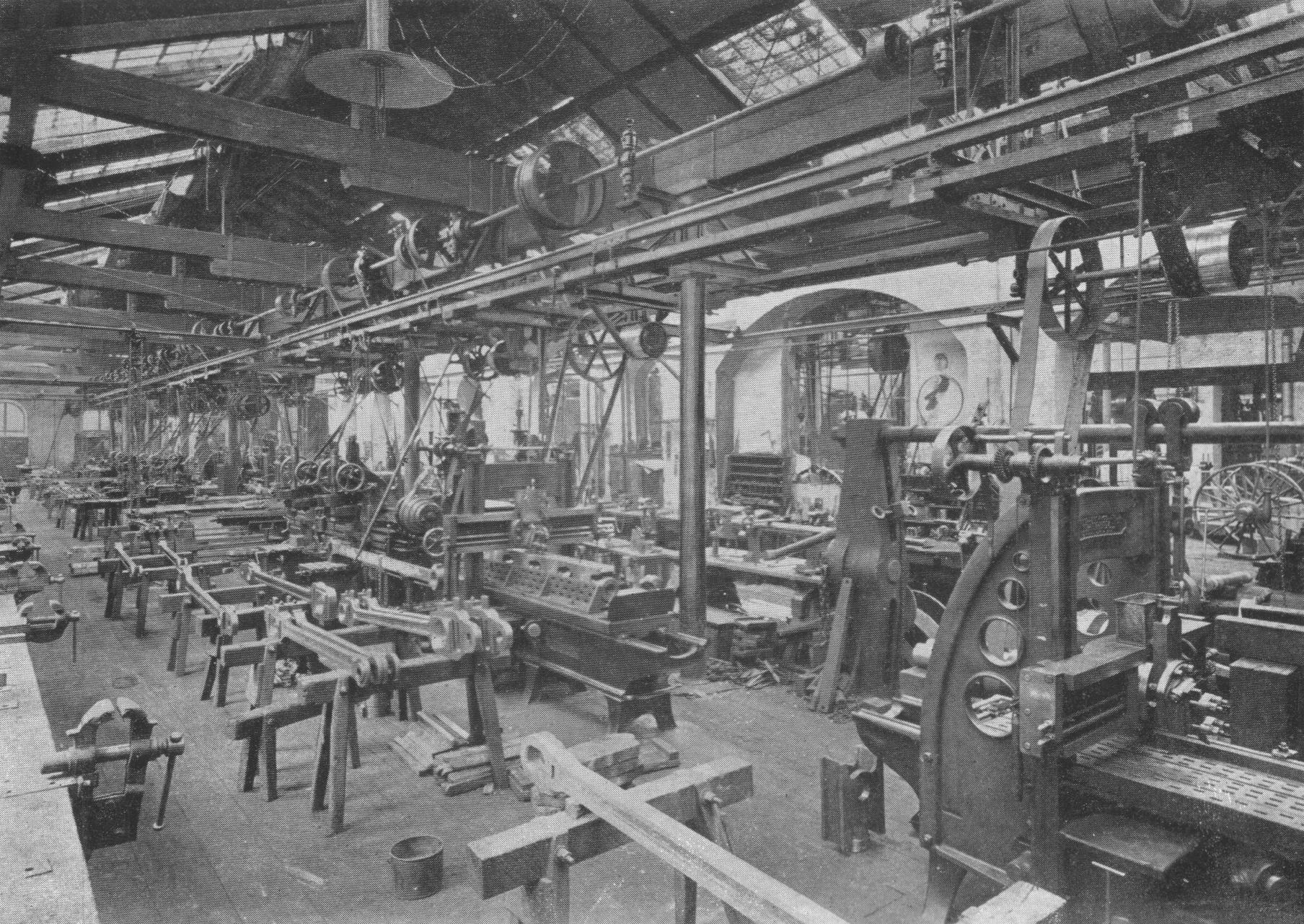
Mechanical workshop for the production of coupling rods

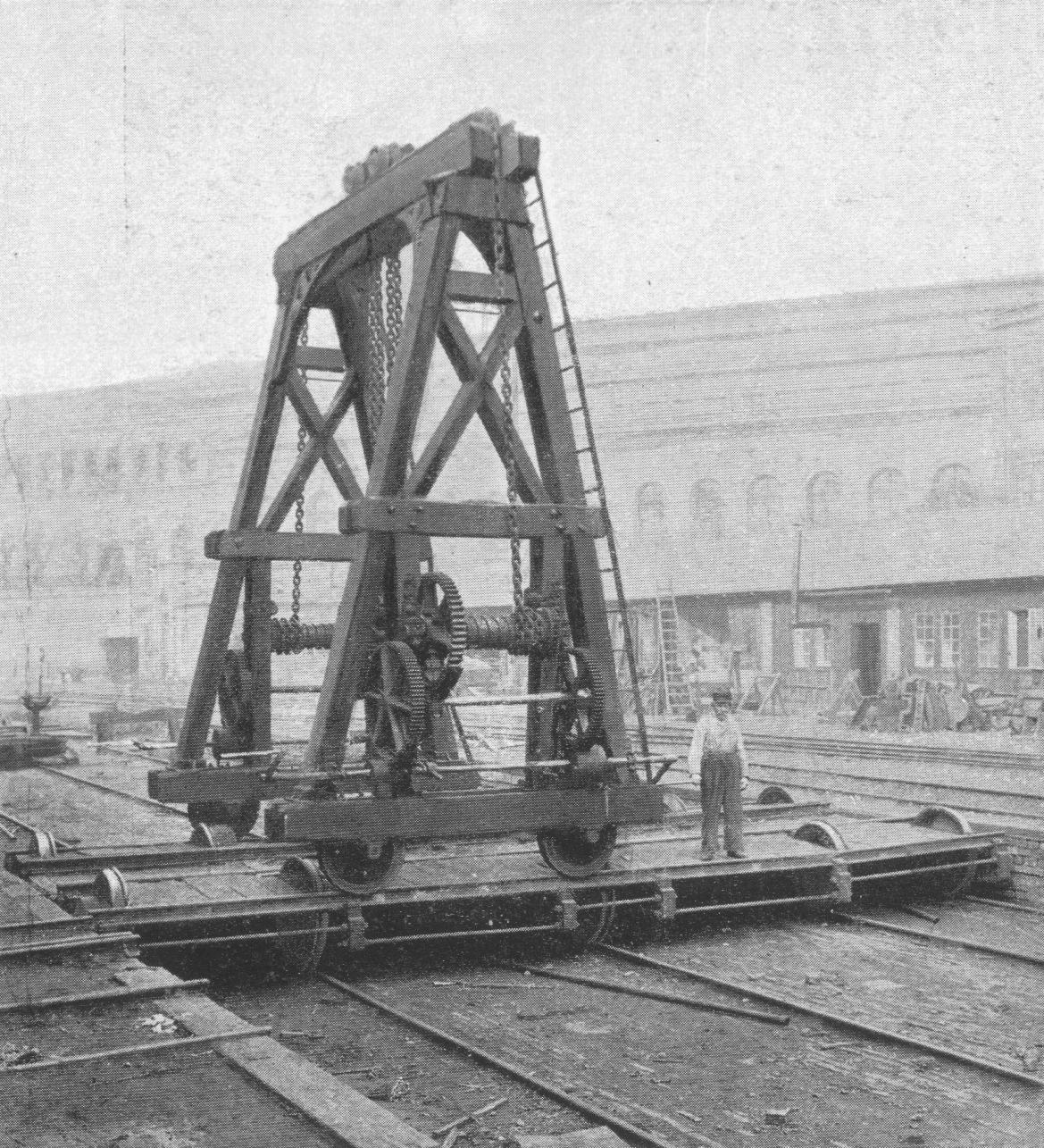
Assembly crane in 1857

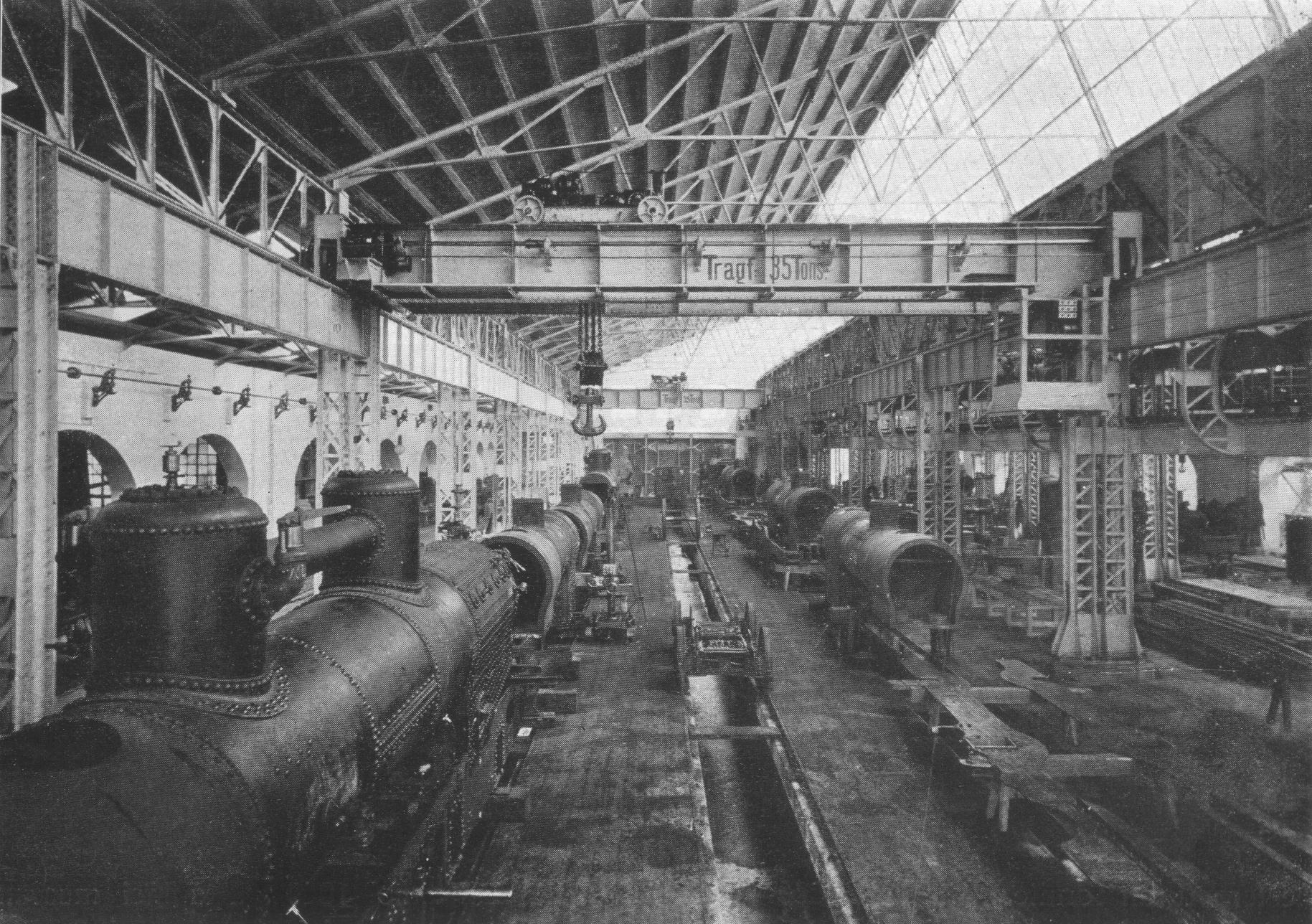
Assembly hall in 1901

== See also ==
- Imperial Royal Privileged Austrian State Railway Company
- List of existing locomotives built by StEG

== Literature ==
- Lokomotive Typen der k. k. landesbef. Maschinen-Fabrik in Wien der k. k. priv. Österr. Staats-Eisenbahn-Gesellschaft. Herausgegeben aus Anlaß der Wiener Weltausstellung im Jahre 1873 unter der Redaktion von John Haswell. Wien, J. Weiner, 1873
- Stroh, E., Die achtzehn Millionen der Staats-Eisenbahn-Gesellschaft, Wien u. a., Jahoda & Siegel, 1912
