= 1898 in South Africa =

- Decades: 1870s; 1880s; 1890s; 1900s; 1910s
- See also: List of years in South Africa

The following lists events that happened during 1898 in South Africa.

== Incumbents ==
- Governor of the Cape of Good Hope and High Commissioner for Southern Africa:Alfred Milner.
- Governor of the Colony of Natal: Charles Bullen Hugh Mitchell.
- State President of the Orange Free State: Martinus Theunis Steyn.
- State President of the South African Republic: Paul Kruger.
- Prime Minister of the Cape of Good Hope: John Gordon Sprigg.
- Prime Minister of the Colony of Natal: Henry Binns.

== Events ==
March

- 26 – The Sabie Game Reserve, renamed to Kruger National Park in 1926, is proclaimed in the Official Gazette of the South African Republic, the first officially designated game reserve.

Unknown date

- Benjamin Jennings Caddy, militant trade unionist, immigrates to South Africa from Australia at the age of 17.

== Births ==
- 6 June – Jim Fouché, second State President of South Africa, in Wepener, Orange Free State. (died 1980)

== Deaths ==
- - 26 March William Guybon Atherstone, medical practitioner, naturalist and geologist, (born 1814)

== Railways ==
=== Railway lines opened ===
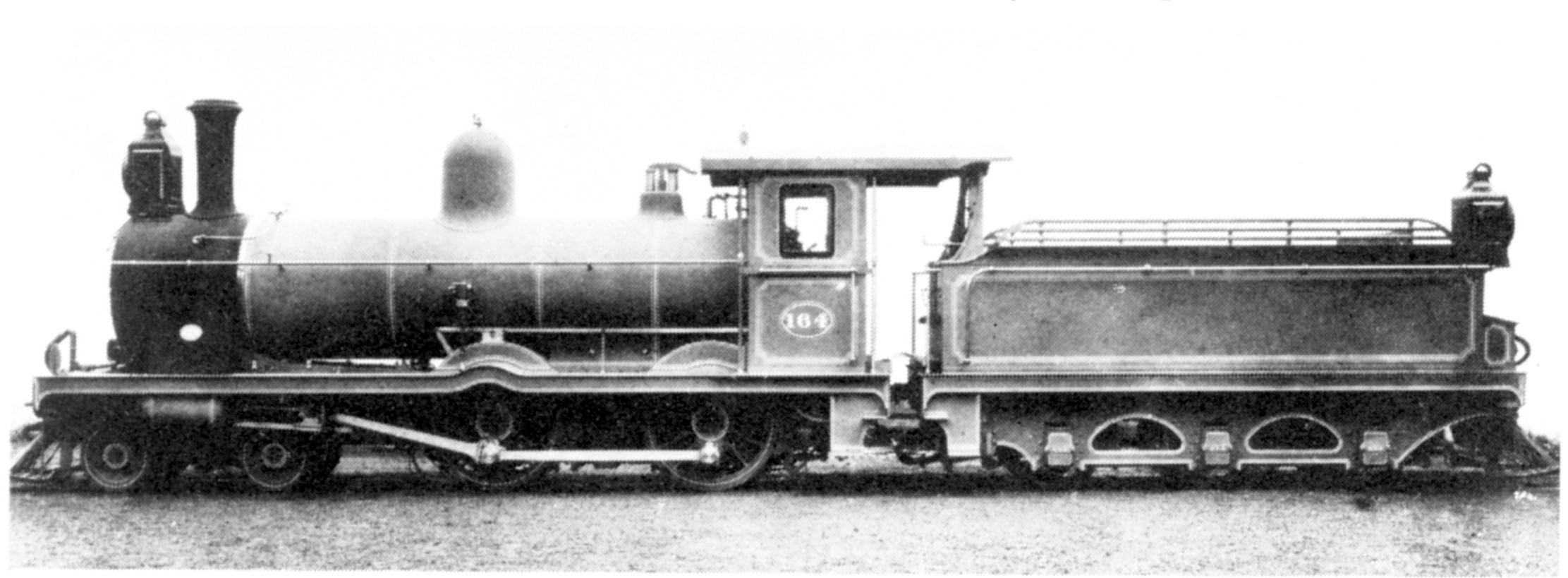
CGR 3rd Class Wynberg Tender

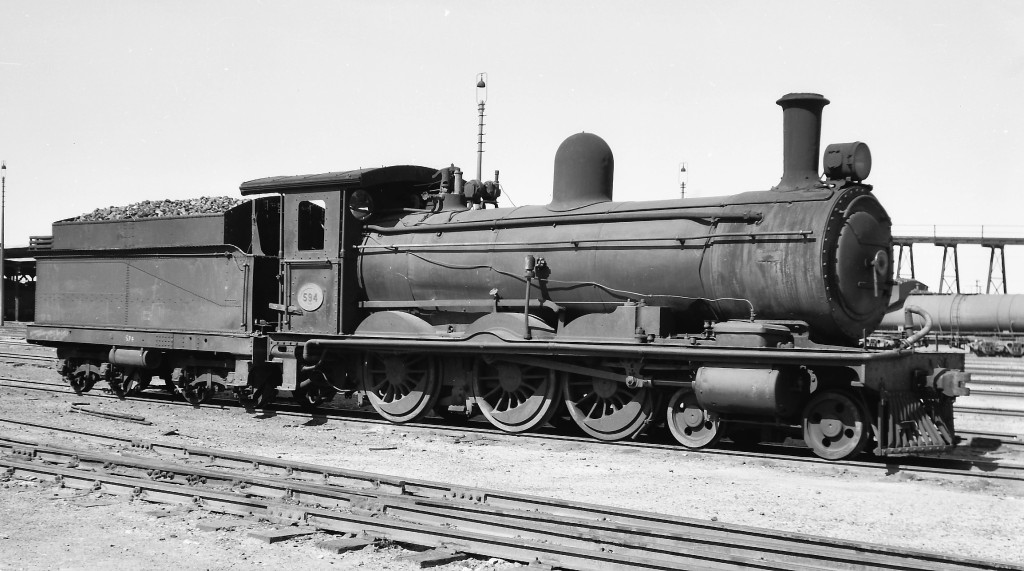
CGR 6th Class

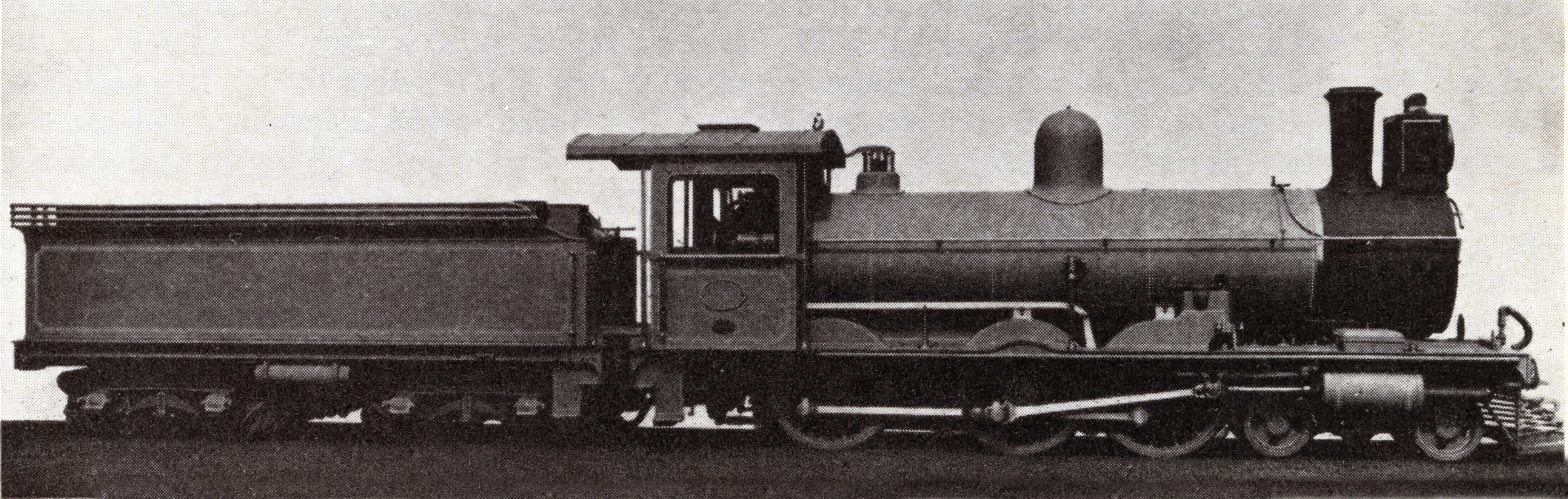
OVGS Class 6L-3

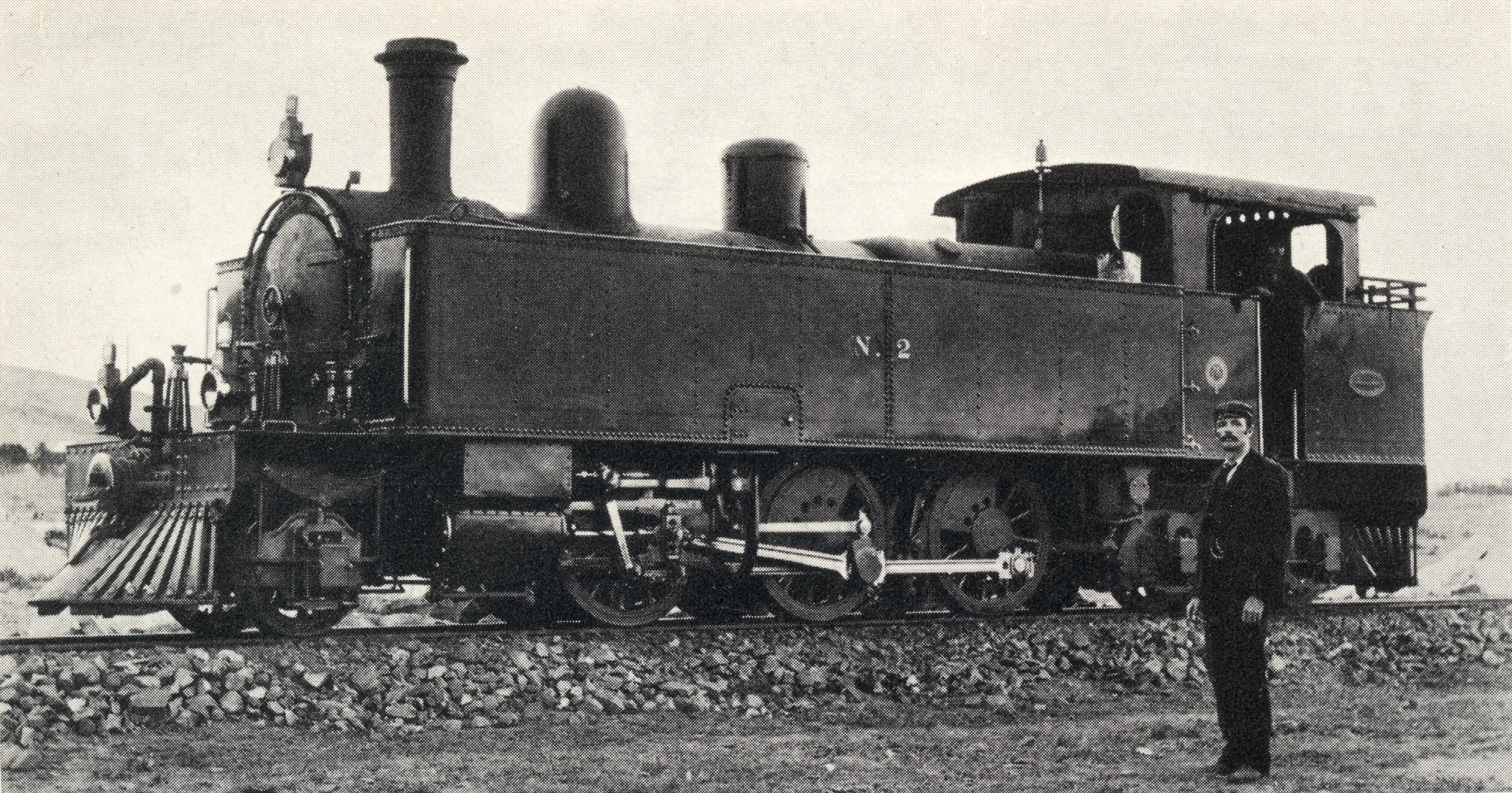
PPR 55 Tonner

- Cape Midland – Bamboo Junction to Cape Collieries, 16 miles (25.7 kilometres).
- 3 March – Cape Midland – Middelburg to Graaff-Reinet, 91 miles (146.5 kilometres).
- 13 June – Natal – Clairwood to Wests in Durban, 6 miles 45 chains (10.6 kilometres).
- 1 October – Transvaal – Pretoria to Potgietersrus, 138 miles (222.1 kilometres).
- 15 October – Namaqualand – Garracoop Junction to Nababeep, 8 miles (12.9 kilometres).
- 1 November – Free State – Theunissen to Winburg, 28 miles 10 chains (45.3 kilometres).
- 1 December – Natal – Tongaat to Tugela, 39 miles (62.8 kilometres).

=== Locomotives ===
Cape

- Two new Cape gauge locomotive types enter service on the Cape Government Railways (CGR):
  - Six 4-4-0 3rd Class Wynberg Tender locomotives in passenger service on the suburban lines in Cape Town.
  - A fourth batch of thirty-three 6th Class 4-6-0 steam locomotives. In 1912 they will be designated Class 6D on the South African Railways (SAR).

Free State

- The Oranje-Vrijstaat Gouwerment-Spoorwegen takes delivery of three of its final six new Cape 6th Class locomotives before its railway operations are taken over by the Imperial Military Railways. In 1912 they will be designated Class 6E on the SAR.

Transvaal

- The independent Pretoria-Pietersburg Railway in the Zuid-Afrikaansche Republiek (Transvaal Republic) places five 55 Tonner 2-6-4T tank locomotives in service. In 1912 they will be designated Class D on the SAR.
