= Gölsdorf Adriatics =

kkStB 210
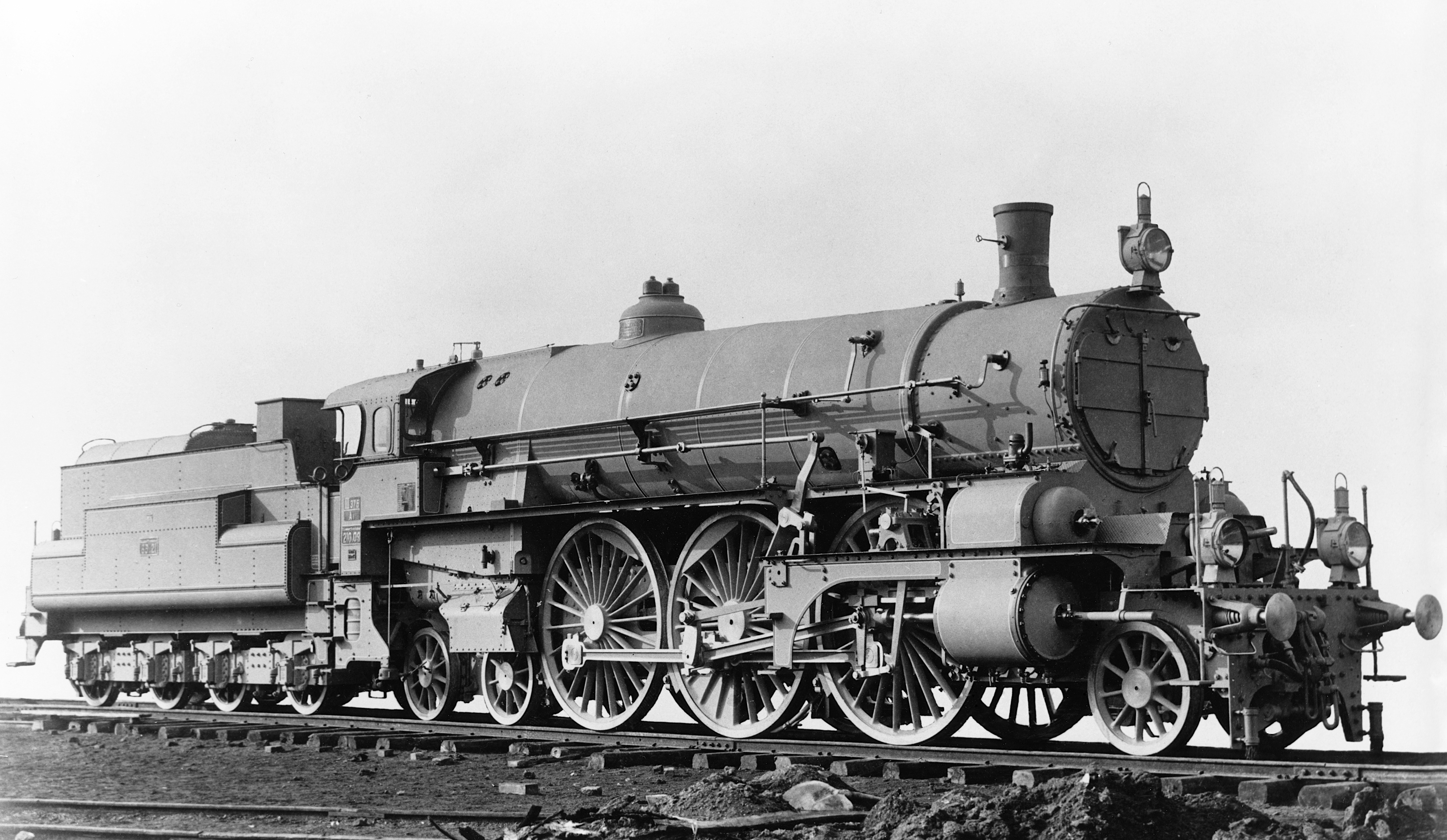
- Works photo
Type and origin
- Power type: Steam
- Designer: Karl Gölsdorf
- Builder: Lokomotivfabrik Floridsdorf (6), BBMF, Prague (5)
- Build date: 1908
- Total produced: 11
Specifications
- Configuration
  - Whyte: 2-6-4
  - UIC: 1′C2′ h4v
- Driver: 2nd
- Gauge: 1,435 mm (4 ft 8 1/2 in)
- Leading dia.: 1.034 m (3 ft 4.7 in)
- Coupled dia.: 2.140 m (7 ft 0.3 in)
- Trailing dia.: 1.034 m (3 ft 4.7 in)
- Wheelbase
  - Engine: 10.450 m (34.28 ft)
  - Coupled: 4.440 m (14.57 ft)
  - incl. tender: 18.226 m (59.80 ft)
- Length
  - Over buffers: 21.530 m (70.64 ft)
- Height: 4.510 m (14.80 ft)
- Adhesive weight: 43.8 t
- Empty weight: 77.1 t
- Service weight: 83.8 t
- Total weight: 138.6 t
- Tender type: 56 (57) (one), 86 (production)
- Fuel type: coal
- Fuel capacity: 8.7 t
- Water cap.: 21 m^{3} (740 cu ft)
- Firebox
  - Grate area: 4.62 m²
- Boiler
  - Small tubes: 291 x 53 mm
- Boiler pressure: 15 bar (1,500 kPa)
- Safety valve: Two Coale pop valves
- Heating surface
  - Firebox: 14.72 m²
  - Tubes: 181.00 m²
- Superheater
  - Type: Gölsdorf-Clench steam dryer
  - Heating area: 69.9 m²
- Cylinders: 4, high pressure inside, low pressure outside
- High-pressure cylinder: 390 mm × 720 mm (15 in × 28 in)
- Low-pressure cylinder: 660 mm × 720 mm (26 in × 28 in)
- Valve gear: Heusinger-Walschaerts
- Valve type: piston
Performance figures
- Maximum speed: 100 km/h (62 mph)
Career
- Number in class: kkStB: 11 (as built); PKP: 9 (transferred from kkStB); SŽD: 1 (transferred from PKP)
- Numbers: kkStB: 210.01–11; PKP: Pn11-1–9; DR: 16 051–056 12; SŽD: Пн11-4
- Retired: 1950 (PKP)

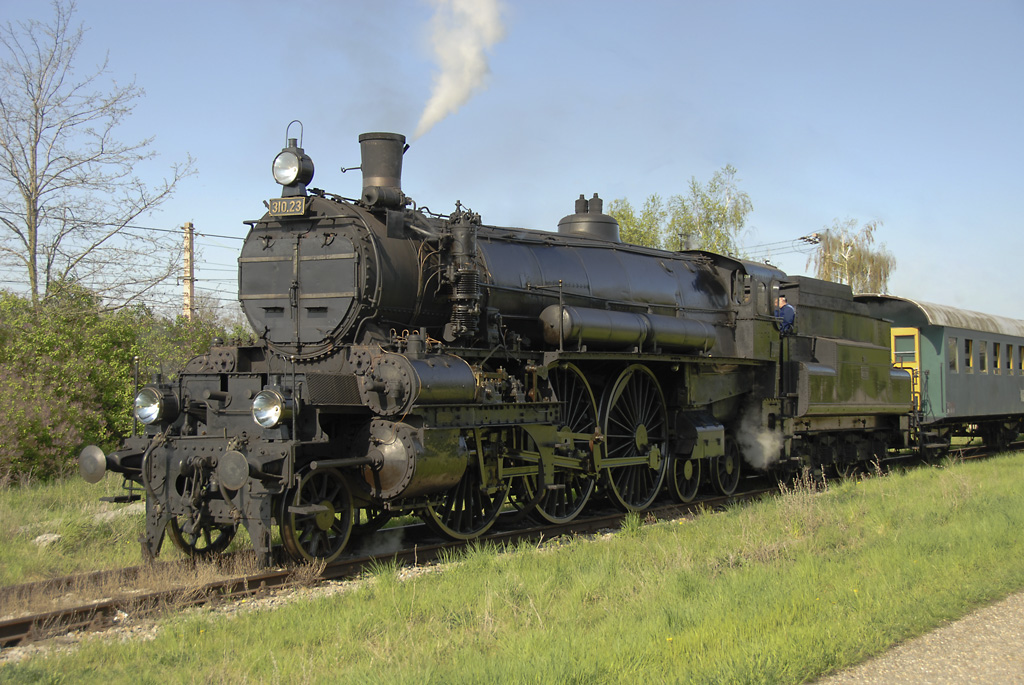
310.23 in preserved service in 2008

The kkStB 210 and 310 classes are a group, that consist of 2-6-4 Adriatic express passenger locomotives of the Imperial Royal Austrian State Railways (kaiserlich-königlichen österreichischen Staatsbahnen or kkStB). They were designed by Karl Gölsdorf and the first engine was built in 1908.

Gölsdorf's goals were to provide a powerful locomotive for the increasingly heavy passenger trains over the mountain routes of Central Europe, but also to keep the axle loading within Austria's low 14.5 ton limit. The requirement was to transport 400-ton express trains at a speed of 100 km/h (62 mph) on flat tracks and 60 km/h (37 mph) on 10‰ gradients. Additionally the poor coal available in Austria required a large grate area.

Although 2-6-4 tank engines became a common layout for large tank locomotives, 2-6-4 tender locomotives were rare. As the first well-known example, Gölsdorf's locomotives gave their name to the arrangement as Adriatics, after the destination that they frequently worked to.

Typically for Gölsdorf, this design was one of a developed sequence across several classes. The 210 locomotives were considered broadly successful, if not without limitations, and gave rise to an improved later series, Gölsdorf's 'masterpiece', the 310 class. The Adriatics were successful overall and operated Austria premier express train The Orient Express.

== Design ==
Gölsdorf was known for his aphorism, "you can't save a tonne of weight on a locomotive - but you can save a kilo in a thousand places" (Note: Man kann an einer Lokomotive nicht eine Tonne Gewicht einsparen - wohl aber an tausend Stellen ein Kilo.) and this was evident here in both the major choices and the minor details. Like many engines of Gölsdorf's designs, the need for high power and yet light weight led him to use a compound design. His first designs had been two cylinder compounds, but he was now designing four cylinder locomotives. Overall the 210 engine represented an intermediate step between the 110 and the 310, with the same use of a four cylinder compound system, but an increasing degree of superheat.

=== 108 and 110 classes ===
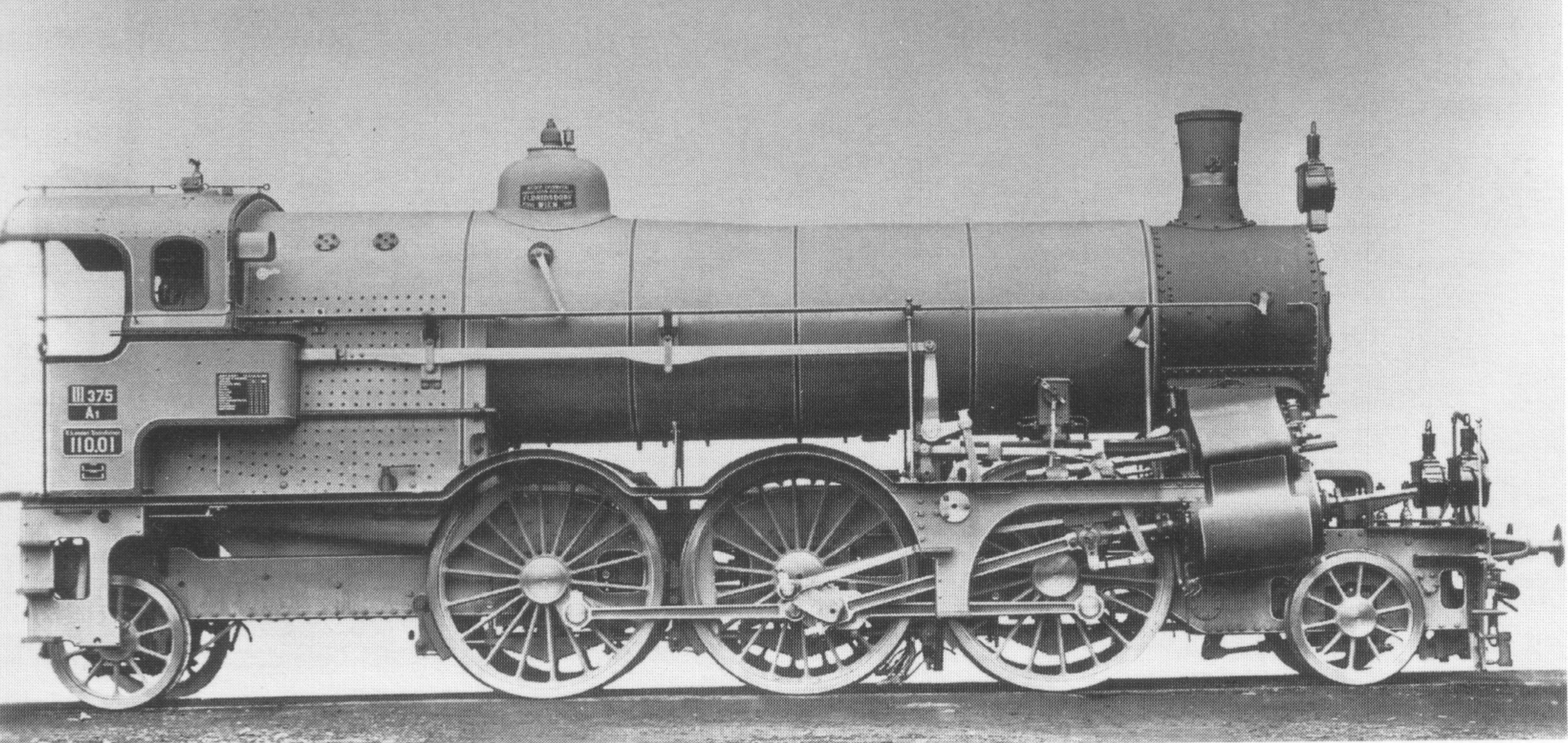
kkStB 110

The 210 engine was an evolutionary development of Gölsdorf's 108 class class of 1901 and 110 class of 1905. These kinds of engines were also four cylinder compounds, but the 110 engine was of 2-6-2 wheel arrangement and with slide valves. The firebox was long to give enough grate area for the poor Austrian coal and the rear trailing truck was thus set a long way behind the coupled wheels. The 110 engine had achieved a short overall wheelbase of 15m, and so fitted onto the 16 m turntables then in use, but this had required the outside low pressure cylinders to be set at a steep angle, risking increased hammer blow.

Their distinctive appearance was a result partly of Gölsdorf's extreme weight saving efforts, and the high pitch of the boiler as he was also convinced that this had no harmful effect on ride quality. The high set boiler above large driving wheels, with a prominent gap between them would be a distinctive aspect of the appearance of all three locomotive classes. This was accentuated by the footplate being cut away in front of the splashers around the driving wheels, as well as the conical boiler barrel allowing a thin forward section to the boiler.

==== Clench steam dryer ====
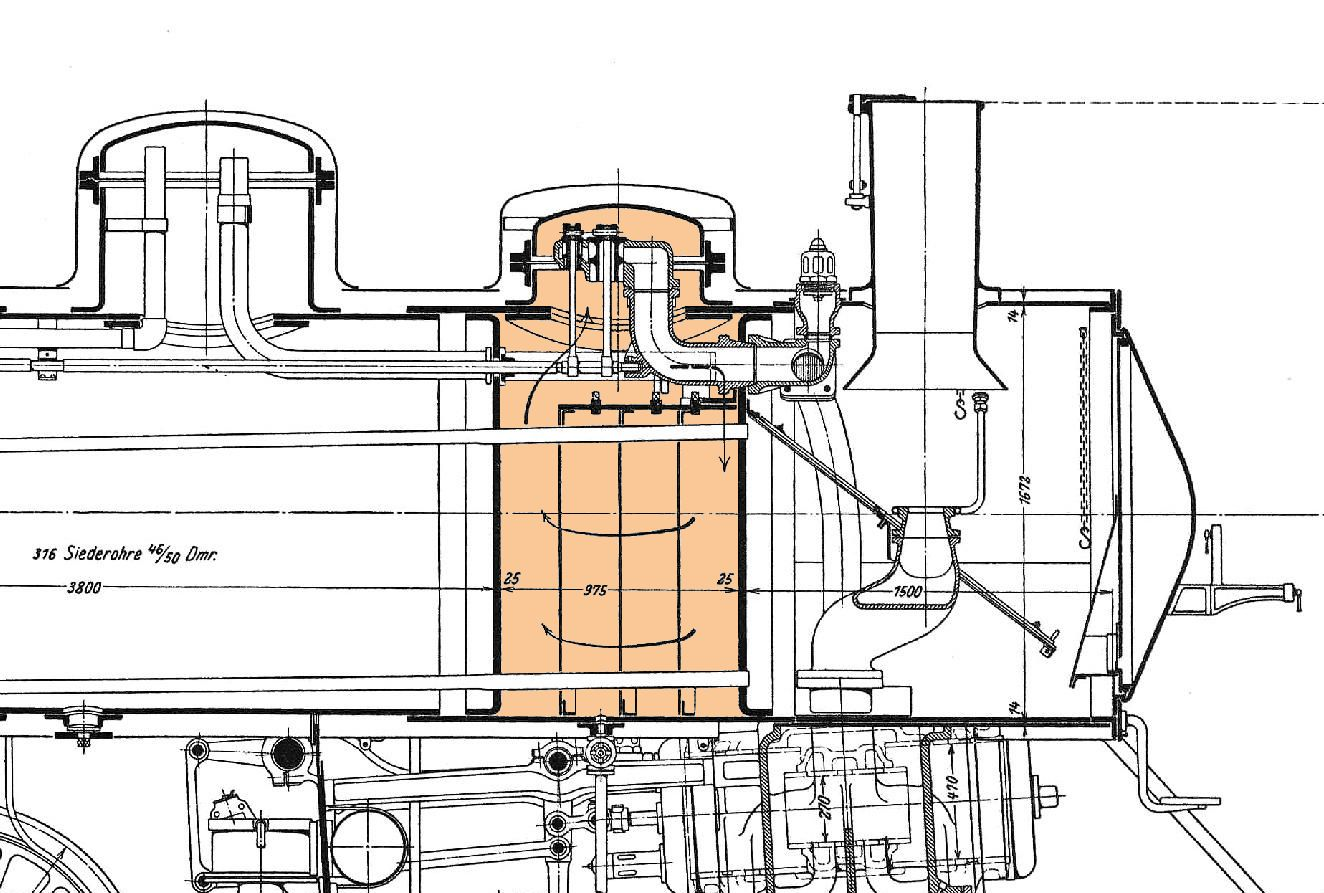
The Crawford–Clench steam dryer of a SBB A 3/5 (931–938 series). The steam space of the dryer is shaded.

From 1907, the 110.5 series were built, fitted with a Gölsdorf-Clench steam dryer. (Note: Also known as a Crawford–Clench steam dryer) This was intended to give some of the efficiency advantage of a superheater, but at a lower steam temperature and so avoiding the technical problems. The 110.5 had slide valves, and these often gave trouble when superheated. Some improvement could be had by using the latest developments in lubricating oil with a mineral base rather than vegetable, but as a mostly American import, this was expensive at the time.

The Clench steam dryer is often described as being smokebox-mounted, but is actually inside the pressure vessel of the boiler barrel. The boiler may be lengthened slightly and an additional tubeplate is mounted inside the smokebox end, making a closed compartment with the far end of the firetubes passing through it. This compartment is filled with saturated steam through a pipe from the main boiler barrel, taken from the usual place high in the dome. An internal cylindrical baffle contra-flows the saturated steam along the firetubes, then to the regulator valve and the cylinders.

For the system fitted to the 210 locomotives, the moisture content of the saturated steam was reduced to a negligible amount and its temperature was raised by about 30–40 °C. This was enough to reduce condensation in the cylinders, but not to cause lubrication problems and oil breakdown.

=== 210 class ===
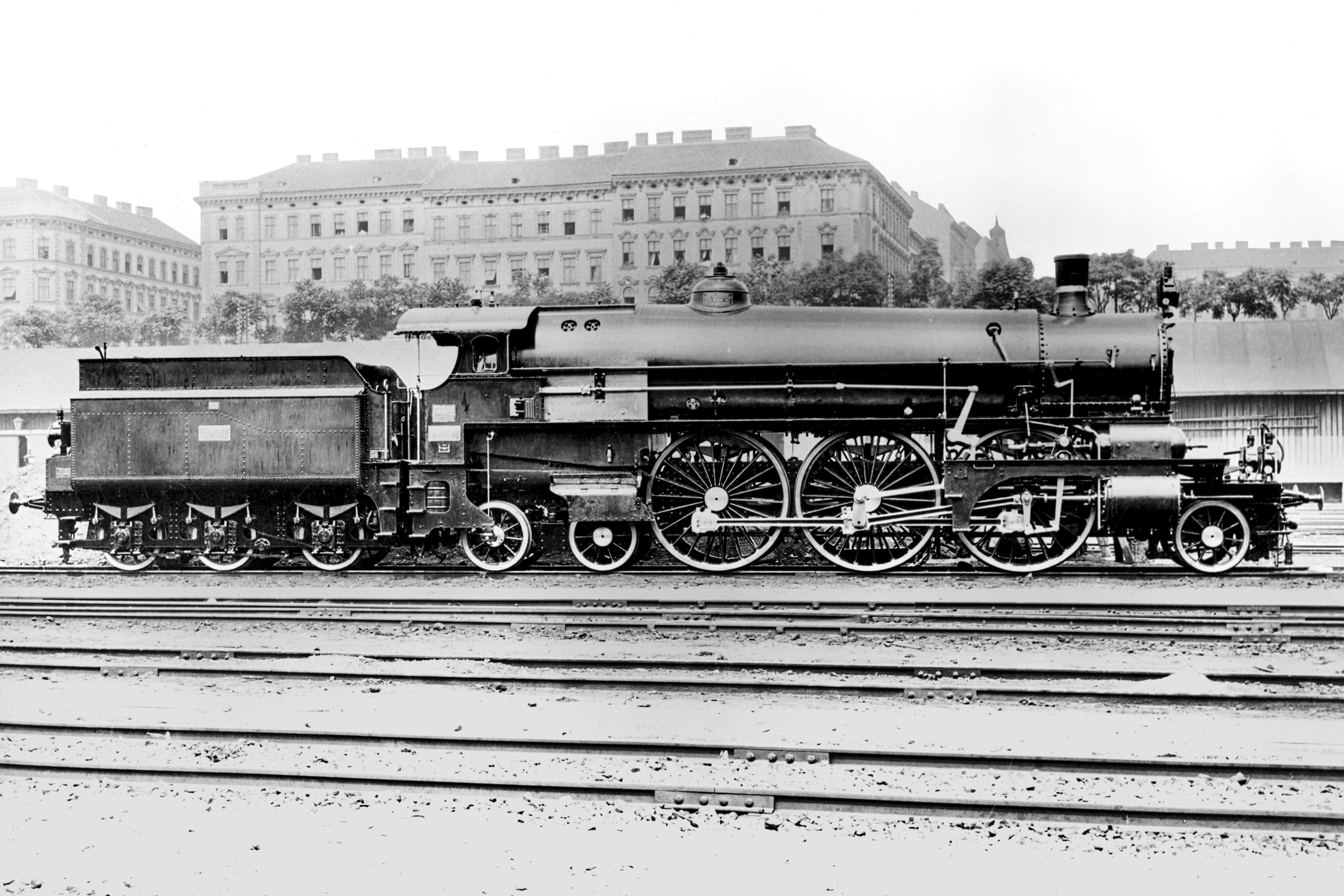
The first engine, 210.01, at Vienna West station in 1908

The next class was an enlargement of the 110, but followed the same principles. It retained the Clench steam dryer but the boiler was enlarged and the cylinders now used piston valves, which were more suitable for use with higher steam temperatures.

==== Cylinders ====
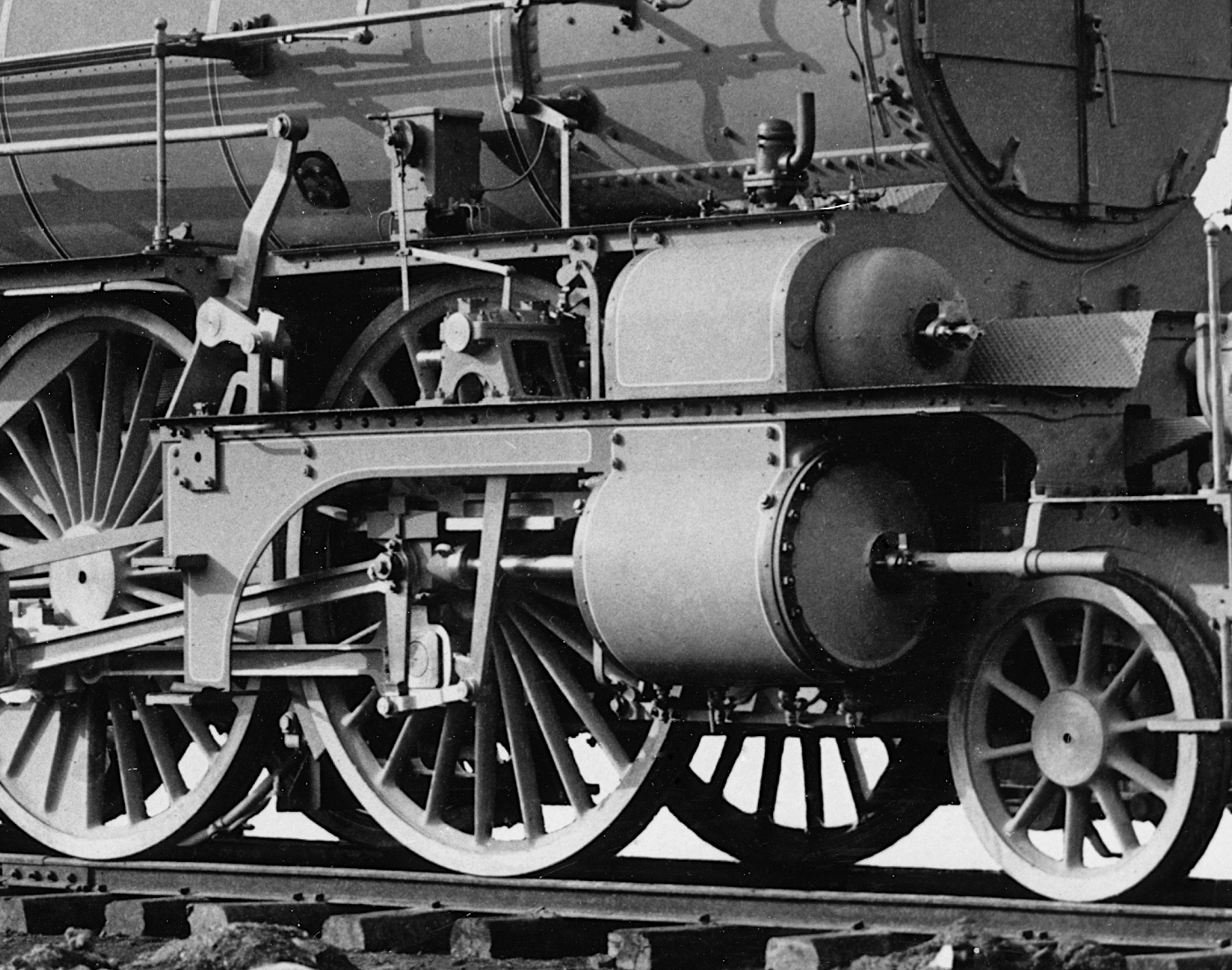
Cylinders of a 210

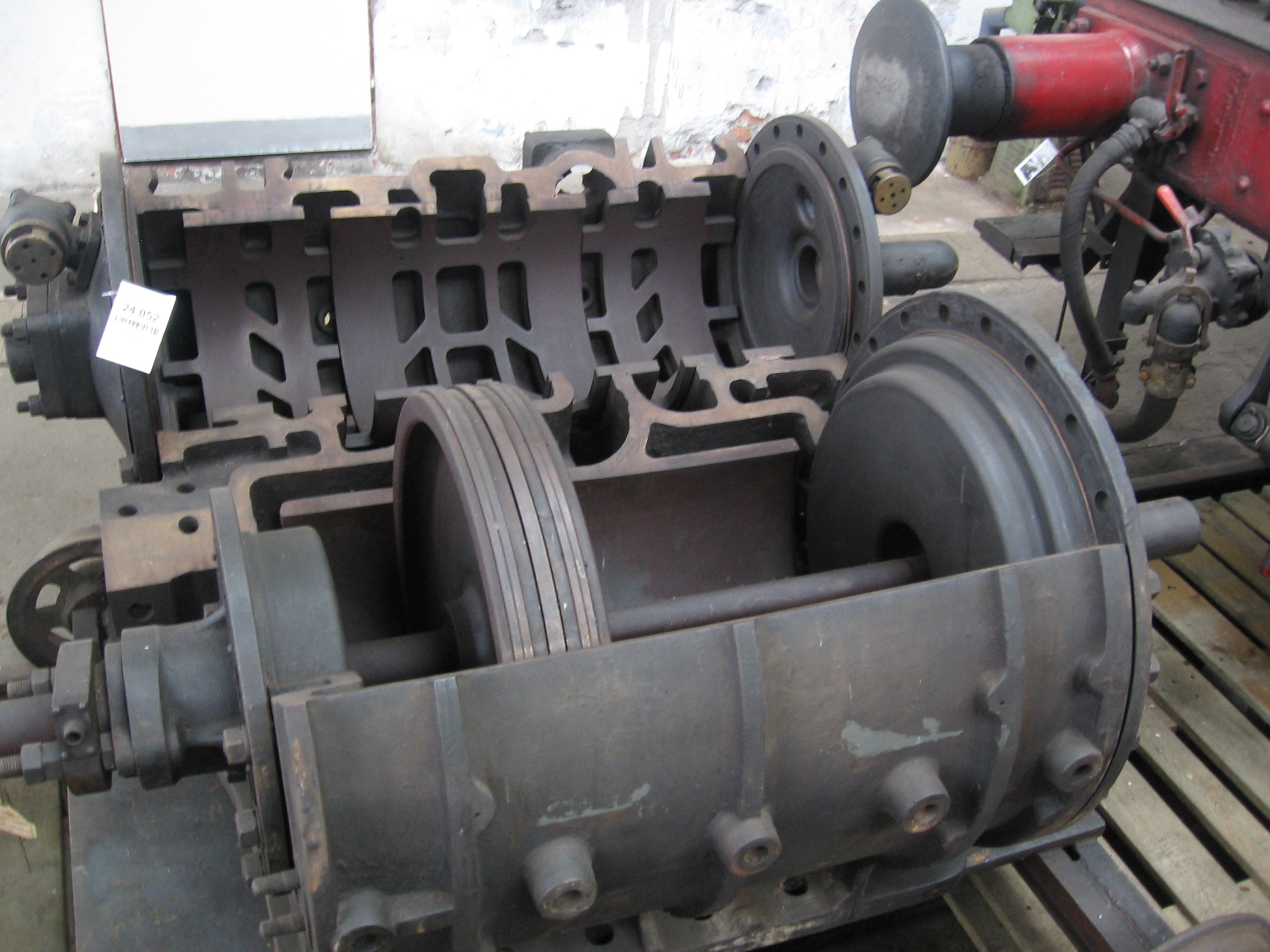
Low pressure cylinder and valve chest of a 310

In order to provide enough power at high speeds, the 210 engine, like its immediate predecessors, was a four-cylinder compound. The two high-pressure cylinders were mounted inside the frames, with the low-pressure ones outside; both drove the second coupled axle. Unlike its predecessor, the two outer cylinders were now located horizontally, helping to reduce hammer blow; the inner ones were still located at an angle of 1:8.5 to the horizontal, to avoid the first coupled axle. The cylinders on each side were quartered at 180° to each other.

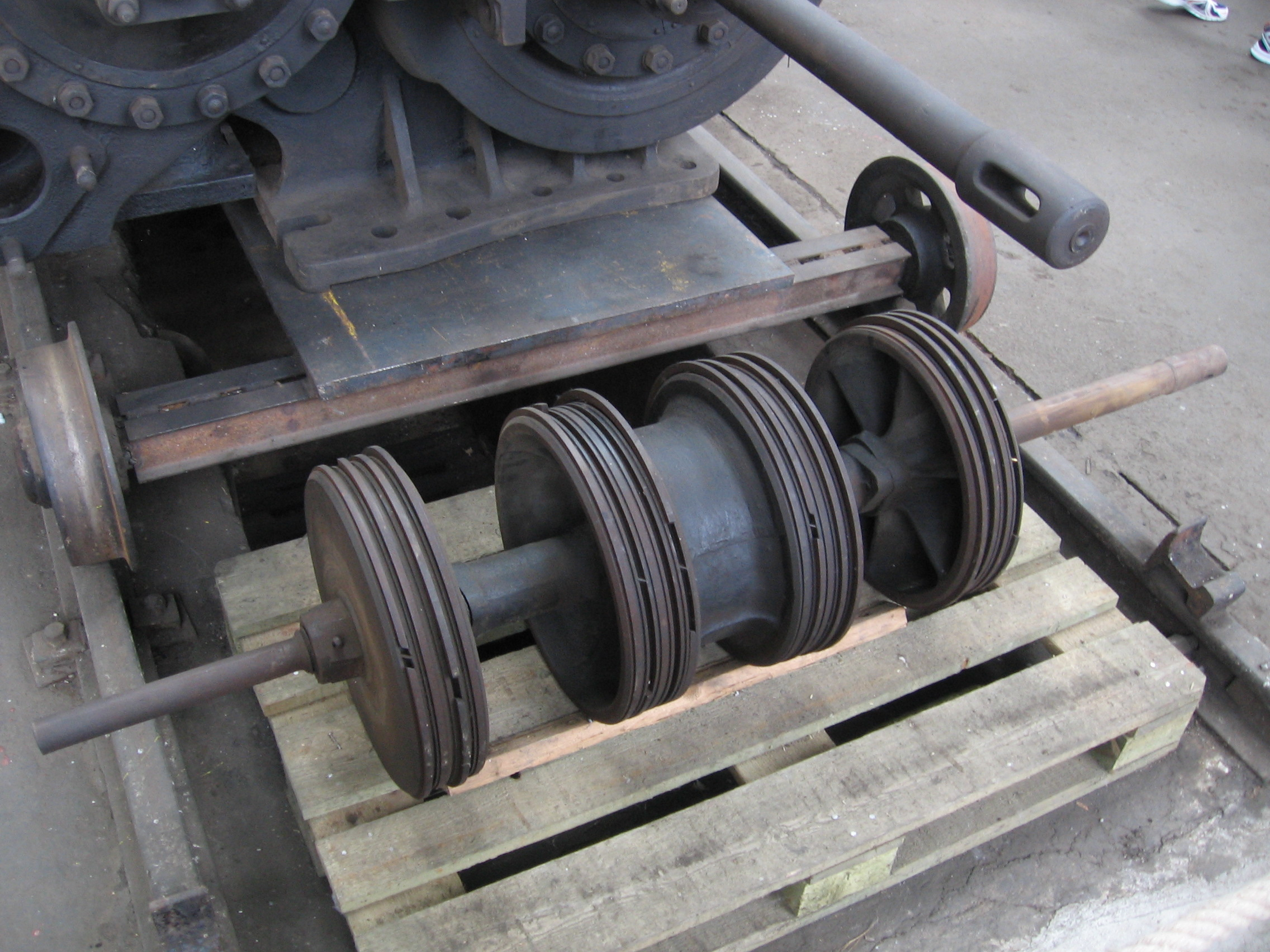
Piston valve of a 310

A single piston valve on each side served both the high- and low-pressure cylinders, with the high-pressure cylinder supplied from the front of the valve and the low-pressure from the rear. As the ports and passages were thus concentrated into the length of a single valve, the valves needed to be large in diameter and so are obvious, above the outside cylinders. The 340 mm diameter high-pressure valve was located at the front of the valve box and the 338 mm low-pressure valve located at the rear. The slight difference in diameter made it easier to withdraw the valve pistons from the front of their valve chest. Gölsdorf chose this rather complicated system because of the simpler external control and the overall lower weight achieved. Unlike his two-cylinder compounds, no simpling valve was needed for starting.

For the 310 engine, Gölsdorf redesigned the piston valve and re-arranged the tandem valve. HP steam now entered at the ends of the valve chest and was controlled by the valves at each end. LP steam was returned to the two spaces between the ends and middle two pistons of the valve, the body of which was cast hollow to connect these two spaces and let the space function as a receiver. The LP exhaust was controlled by the middle pistons and the circumferential space between them. This system was simpler overall, but it required the LP valve chest ports to be crossed over between the ports on the valve chest and the cylinder, as the HP exhaust from one end had to supply the LP inlet at the other.

The valves were driven by Heusinger–Walschaerts valvegear. The shared valves meant that only a single set was required for each side. As the return crank was positioned 90° ahead of the crank, when running forwards the die block was in the lower part of the expansion link. A screw reverser was fitted and the reversing rod was forwards for forward running, with a lifting link ahead of the expansion link. The valve chests also had a Ricour air snifting valve on top, combined with a safety valve.

The crossheads were single-bar, as the lightest option for a locomotive that would run predominantly in one direction. The connecting and coupling rods were made with an I-shaped cross-section. Although this would become typical later on, at this time it was another of Gölsdorf's weight-saving innovations.

==== Boiler ====
The boiler was to the design developed for the 280 class of 1906, another of Gölsdorf's four cylinder compounds intended for express passenger service. They were built for the steeply-graded Arlberg Railway, and later used on the Brenner Pass as well, so had an especially light axle load limit of 13.8 t. They were thus built with a 2-10-0 wheel arrangement to spread the load across more axles. The resultant small wheels also gave greater tractive effort for the same power.

The main boiler drum was made of three rings of steel plates. The front ring was 1.66 m (5 ft 5 in) in diameter and rolled from 18mm plate, the rear ring was 1.8 m (5 ft 11 in) and of 21.5mm plate. The middle ring was conical and tapered between the rear and front rings. As was customary for Austrian locomotives, the steam dome was placed on the rear boiler ring, directly above the third coupled axle. Two 4″ Coale direct spring-loaded safety valves were mounted on the cover of the dome. Tapered boilers were in widespread use by this time and gave weight savings that would appeal to Gölsdorf. The larger diameter at the firebox gave the most steam space where it was needed and a smaller, lighter boiler toward the chimney. Especially with the steam dryer, as this needed even less diameter. There were 291 fire tubes of 53 mm outside diameter but no flues. The forward ring was where the steam dryer was located, so the additional tubeplate was at the rear of this, leaving a steam space 1.45 m long.

The sliding flat-plate regulator was placed in the steam dryer chamber; its actuating rod and bellcrank emerged through the right hand side of the boiler and can easily be seen on photos. Some Clench steam dryers had an additional dome above the dryer chamber to house the regulator, but the 210 engine fitted it within the diameter of the boiler and there were merely two access manholes in the top of the drum, hidden beneath the boiler cladding.

The rear wall of the boiler sloped forwards to reduce weight, by making the upper part of the firebox smaller in relation to the grate area. The length of the firebox placed in the boiler was approximately 2.7 meters, while its width was 1.67 m at the top and slightly widened at the bottom, so that the grate width was 1.89 meters. The surface area of the grate, consisting of two parts, was thus considerable, 4.62 m². The ashpan could be emptied through prominent chutes on either side, above the leading wheel of the rear bogie. The smokebox door was of the typical Austrian design, with two side-hinged flat leaves and multiple lever latches.

==== Running gear ====
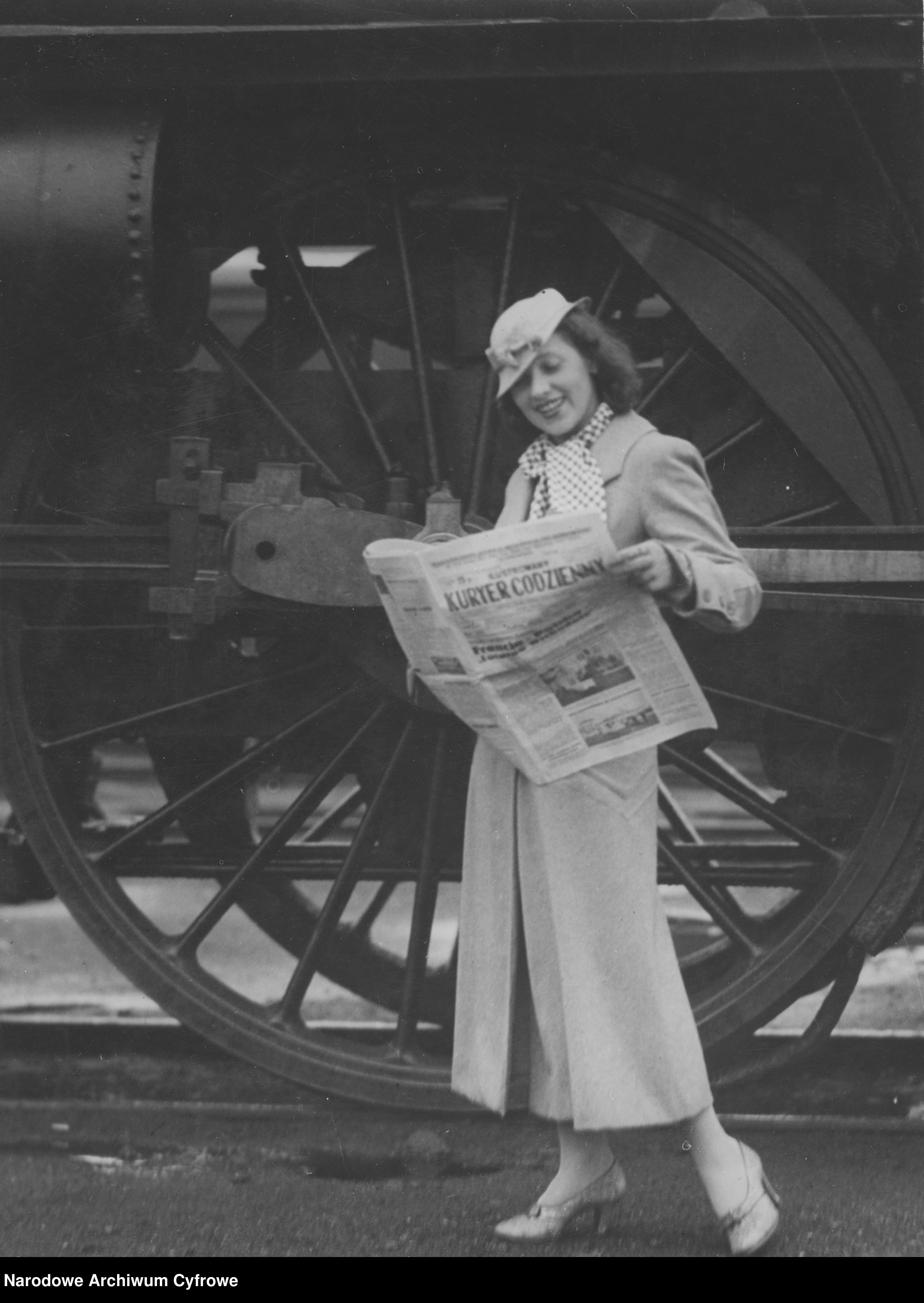
Polish actress Helena Grossówna poses in front of the wheel of a Pn12 locomotive in 1934

As an express passenger loco, the 210s were given notably large driving wheels of 2,140 mm (84 in) diameter. Both wheels and axles were made of a nickel alloy steel for strength and lightness and the non-crank axles were also drilled through.

The earlier 108 class of 1901 had used the widespread 4-4-2 Atlantic engine wheel arrangement with a four-wheeled leading bogie. This was a popular choice at the time for express locomotives running at high speeds and needing to support a large firebox. When this expanded to need three driving axles, most designers chose either the 4-6-0 engine or the 4-6-2 Pacific engine wheel arrangement

To keep a short wheelbase and low weight, from the 110 class of 1905 onwards, there was only a single front carrying axle rather than the two axle bogie used previously. To run well at high speeds, this wheel and the first coupled wheel were combined as a Krauss-Helmholtz bogie, with a fixed pivot between the two axles and the coupled wheels able to move sideways. This gave a 2-6-2 or 1′C1′ Prairie arrangement, although its articulation was in some ways still similar to the 4-4-2.

The 210 class maintained this same Krauss-Helmholtz leading bogie as the 110, but the increased fire grate area from 3.67m² to 4.67m² needed more support at the rear and so a four-wheeled trailing Bissel bogie was used, giving the first 2-6-4 or 1′C2′ Adriatic express layout. (Note: South Africa had previously converted the small 6Z class from a 2-6-2 to 2-6-4 layout.)

The Adriatic layout never became popular for tender locomotives and only Gölsdorf's two classes made significant use of it. Outside Austria's constraints on length and weight, express locomotives nearly all adopted a two-axle leading bogie for the Pacific or 4-6-4 Baltic (Note: Hudson in the US.) layout. The complexity of a Krauss-Helmholtz bogie was more than that of a simple bogie and so they were not widely used.

==== Tender ====
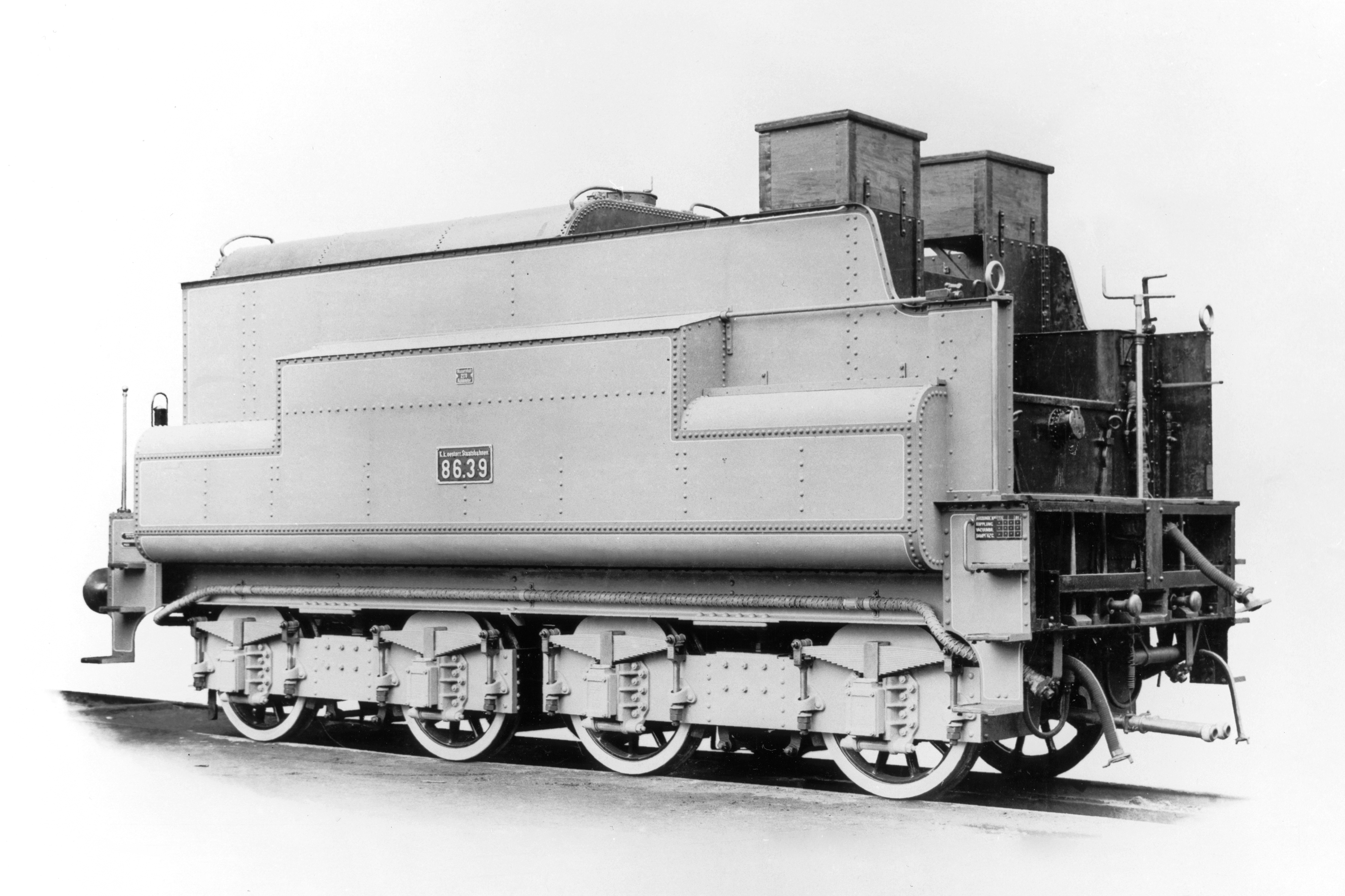
Type 86 tender

The original tender for 210.01 was the last of the widespread, small flat-sided six-wheel type 56 tenders that had been introduced in 1894 with Gölsdorf's first locomotive design, the class 6. As this example had been built with a lower empty weight, reduced from 17 tonnes to 15.5 tonnes, it was numbered as 57.01. (Note: It is shown with this 57.01 tender in the photo here at Vienna in 1908) In 1910 it was renumbered 56.342, as it was otherwise identical to the rest of the series. The 56 tender looked a little disproportionate behind the new locomotive as it was quite short and the spacing of the rear two axles was closer than between the first two.

For the production locomotives, the tender was replaced with the longer 86 four-axle, bogie tender developed for the class 108 engine. This was heavier, at 22.2 tonnes empty, and contained only a little more coal at 9.0 m³ rather than 8.5 m³. Water capacity though was increased to 21.0 m³ from 16.7 m³, giving the tender its distinctive 'pannier' look.

== Construction ==
=== 210 ===
The first example of the type (210.01) engine was built in 1908 by Lokomotivfabrik Floridsdorf as works number 1789. Test runs reached a top speed of over 100 km/h (62 mph) when hauling a 406-tonne train on level track.

From 1910, five more (210.02–06, works numbers 1926–1930) were built by Lokomotivfabrik Floridsdorf, and five (210.07–11, 356–359) by the Bohemian-Moravian Machine Factory in Prague. The production locomotives were close to the prototype with minimal differences.

=== 310 ===
From 1911, the fully superheated version of the locomotive, the 310 series, was delivered. The changes apart from the boiler were relatively small and they were produced by the same production plant.

== Service history ==
=== 210 ===
They were capable of hauling 406-ton trains at speeds of 100 to 110 km/h in regular service. Their initial service importantly included The Orient Express.

They were used on the Franz-Josefs-Bahn and the Northern Railway. When the class 310 was acquired from 1911 onwards, all but three of the class 210s went to Lviv in Galicia, which would later become part of Poland.

==== Post-War service and the Pn11 ====
Two engines (210.01 and 210.10) had to be written off as war losses during the First World War after they were captured by Russia in 1914.

Before the War, a major route for the Adriatics had been The Orient Express through Vienna and Budapest. (Note: Austria-Hungary imposed the constraint on international through services that they would pass through the capitals. This was cancelled by the Treaty of Saint Germain.) After the War, a new route began for this, the Simplon Orient Express. This ran South of the Alps instead of North, using the Simplon Tunnel and a route through Milan, Venice and Trieste. (Note: Trieste had been part of the Austrian Littoral before the War, but its history post-War is infamously complex and outside the scope of this article.) This reduced Austria's involvement with the route and their demand for top link passenger locos.

After the breakup of Austria-Hungary and the 1919 Treaty of Saint Germain, 210 and 310 locos, already in Lviv, came to the Polish PKP as class Pn11. Bundesbahnen Österreich kept 43 of the best condition 310s and the 210s transferred appear to have been the oldest. The Polish 210 transferees were later fitted with more conventional superheated boilers, following the design of the 310 engine.

During the Second World War, the German Reichsbahn designated the captured locomotives of this class as 16 051–056. After the end of the war, the surviving vehicles returned to Poland (via the ČSD, the ÖBB and the DR), where they were again classified as class Pn11, but without their original PKP running numbers. The former 210.05 (Pn11-4) went to the USSR as Пн11-4.

All eight survivors were scrapped in 1950.

== See also ==
- 2-8-4 Berkshire layout, also with a single leading truck but two rear axles, except with four coupled axles.
