= South African Class 6Z 2-6-4 =

1901 design of steam locomotive

CGR 6th Class 2-6-4 South African Class 6Z 2-6-4
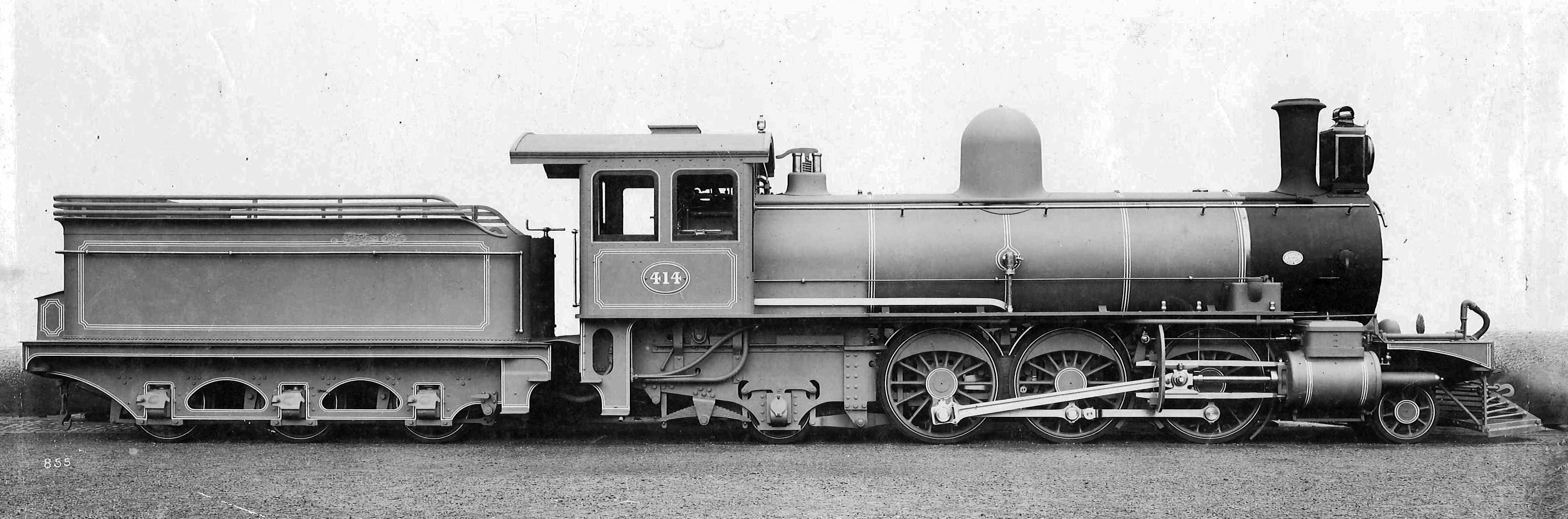
- CGR 6th Class 2-6-2 Prairie as built, before modification to 2-6-4 Adriatic
Type and origin
- Power type: Steam
- Designer: Cape Government Railways (H.M. Beatty)
- Builder: Neilson, Reid and Company
- Serial number: 5867–5870, 6075–6078
- Model: CGR 6th Class 2-6-4
- Build date: 1901
- Total produced: 8
- Rebuilder: Cape Government Railways
- Rebuild date: 1902
- Number rebuilt: 4 from 2-6-2 (Prairie)
Specifications
- Configuration
  - Whyte: 2-6-4 (Adriatic)
  - UIC: 1′C2′ n2
- Driver: 3rd coupled axle
- Gauge: 3 ft 6 in (1,067 mm) Cape gauge
- Leading dia.: 28 1/2 in (724 mm)
- Coupled dia.: 54 in (1,372 mm)
- Trailing dia.: 28 1/2 in (724 mm)
- Tender wheels: 37 in (940 mm)
- Wheelbase: 45 ft 9 1/8 in (13,948 mm)
  - Axle spacing (Asymmetrical): 1-2: 5 ft 1 in (1,549 mm); 2-3: 4 ft 9 in (1,448 mm)
  - Engine: 28 ft (8,534 mm)
  - Coupled: 9 ft 10 in (2,997 mm)
  - Trailing: 5 ft (1,524 mm)
  - Tender: 10 ft (3,048 mm)
- Length
  - Over couplers: 55 ft 7 1/4 in (16,948 mm)
- Height: 12 ft 10 in (3,912 mm)
- Frame type: Bar
- Axle load: 12 LT 17 cwt (13,060 kg)
  - Leading: 5 LT 19 cwt (6,045 kg)
  - 1st coupled: 12 LT 17 cwt (13,060 kg)
  - 2nd coupled: 11 LT 3 cwt (11,330 kg)
  - 3rd coupled: 12 LT 1 cwt (12,240 kg)
  - Trailing: 12 LT 8 cwt (12,600 kg)
  - Tender axle: Axle 1: 10 LT 8 cwt (10,570 kg); Axle 2: 10 LT 15 cwt (10,920 kg); Axle 3: 10 LT 17 cwt (11,020 kg)
- Adhesive weight: 36 LT 1 cwt (36,630 kg)
- Loco weight: 54 LT 8 cwt (55,270 kg)
- Tender weight: 32 LT (32,510 kg)
- Total weight: 86 LT 8 cwt (87,790 kg)
- Tender type: YE (3-axle)
- Fuel type: Coal
- Fuel capacity: 5 LT 10 cwt (5.6 t)
- Water cap.: 2,825 imp gal (12,800 L)
- Firebox
  - Type: Round-top
  - Grate area: 25.5 sq ft (2.37 m^{2})
- Boiler
  - Pitch: 6 ft 10 in (2,083 mm)
  - Diameter: 4 ft 7 in (1,397 mm)
  - Tube plates: 13 ft 10 7/8 in (4,239 mm)
  - Small tubes: 188: 2 in (51 mm)
- Boiler pressure: 170 psi (1,172 kPa)
- Safety valve: Ramsbottom
- Heating surface
  - Firebox: 96 sq ft (8.9 m^{2})
  - Tubes: 1,366 sq ft (126.9 m^{2})
  - Total surface: 1,462 sq ft (135.8 m^{2})
- Cylinders: Two
- Cylinder size: 18 in (457 mm) bore 26 in (660 mm) stroke
- Valve gear: Stephenson
- Couplers: Johnston link-and-pin
Performance figures
- Tractive effort: 19,890 lbf (88.5 kN) @ 75%
Career
- Operators: Cape Government Railways; South African Railways
- Class: CGR 6th Class 2-6-4; SAR Class 6Z
- Number in class: 8
- Numbers: CGR 270–277, SAR 713–720
- Delivered: 1901–1902
- First run: 1901
- Withdrawn: 1934

The South African Railways Class 6Z 2-6-4 of 1901 was a steam locomotive from the pre-Union era in the Cape of Good Hope.

In 1901, the Cape Government Railways placed four 6th Class steam locomotives with a 2-6-2 or 1′C1 Prairie type wheel arrangement in service. The engines were soon modified to a 2-6-4 Adriatic type wheel arrangement. In 1902, another four locomotives were placed in service, built with the 2-6-4 wheel arrangement. These latter four were the first tender locomotives in the world to be built with this wheel arrangement. In 1912, when they were assimilated into the South African Railways, these eight locomotives were renumbered and designated Class 6Z.

== Design ==
The Cape 6th Class 2-6-4 locomotive was designed at the Salt River works of the Cape Government Railways (CGR). It was a further development of the very successful 6th Class 4-6-0 locomotive, based on the experience gained with the several British and American versions of the Class and incorporating features from both. The design began as an experimental redesign of the 6th Class with a bar frame and wide firebox and with a 2-6-2 Prairie type wheel arrangement.

=== Bridle casting ===
Good though the 6th Class 4-6-0 locomotives were, the requirement grew for larger and more powerful engines. At the time, it was becoming increasingly apparent that such locomotives would require fireboxes with appreciably larger grate areas. This was not possible with the existing type of frame on a Cape gauge locomotive where the firebox was arranged between the rearmost coupled wheels. Longer fireboxes were impractical since it would be accompanied by greater fatigue to firemen as well as difficulties in design. To arrange the firebox over the coupled wheels would be unsuitable for adoption on larger locomotives, given the limitation on the maximum height of the boiler centreline above the railhead which was in vogue at the time.

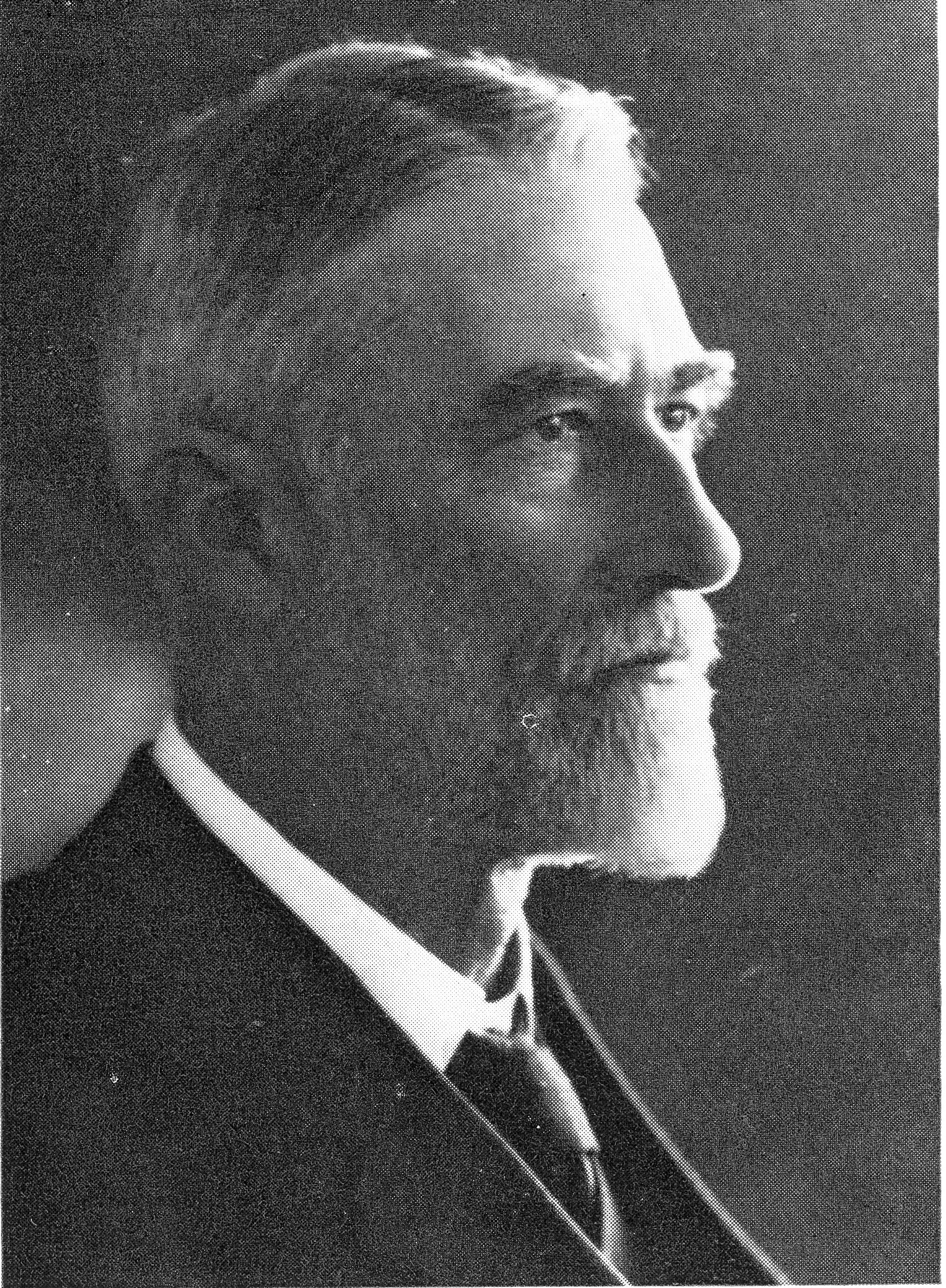
H.M. Beatty

To overcome this problem, CGR Chief Locomotive Superintendent H.M. Beatty prepared designs for a new locomotive with a 2-6-2 wheel arrangement of which the frame terminated in front of the firebox, where it connected to a casting termed the 'bridle casting'. This casting extended out on either side and had wider spaced frames attached to its rear, which allowed a wider and deeper firebox with an interior width of 49 1/4 inches (1,251 millimetres).

Because of the widened frames, trailing carrier wheels were incorporated to take the weight of the firebox. Unlike usual practice, they were not arranged as a bissel truck, but the outside axle boxes worked in hornblocks bolted to the frames. The arrangement (in UIC terms) was thus a 1′C1 rather than a 1′C1′. The result was that the fixed wheelbase was extended backwards beyond that of the coupled wheels. Since the coupled wheels were also located further forward to accommodate the deeper firebox, the two-axle pilot bogie was replaced by a single axle bissel truck.

This was the first time that such a method of widening the frame had been used and it proved to be so successful that it was copied widely by both the Natal Government Railways (NGR) and the Central South African Railways (CSAR) in their subsequent locomotive designs. The one disadvantage of the bridle casting was that it proved prone to serious damage in even minor collisions. The design was applied to South African locomotives for many years to come, until boiler centre lines were raised to a height which permitted the main frames to be reduced in depth and therefore to continue right through to the rear buffer beam.

=== Redesign ===
The first order for four locomotives was placed with Neilson, Reid and Company in 1901 and delivered in that same year. These locomotives introduced the type YE three-axle tender. They were numbered in the range from 270 to 273 for the Western System of the CGR and subjected to exhaustive testing during which it was found that, while they were good locomotives, they were inclined to be unsteady at speed. The locomotive design was therefore modified by replacing the trailing carrier wheels with a two-axle bogie.

Another four locomotives incorporating this modification were ordered from Neilson, Reid later in 1901. They were numbered in the range from 274 to 277 upon delivery in 1902. The change in design was found to have made a marked improvement in the locomotive's stability at speed and the first four locomotives were therefore also modified accordingly.

=== Characteristics ===
The shell plates of the boiler and firebox were of mild steel, the tubes were of brass and the firebox of copper. The grates were of the finger-bar rocking type. The bar frame was 4 1/2 inches (114 millimetres) thick and was machined from solid mild steel slab. Steel castings were provided for the front buffer, knees at the motion plate, spring and compensating beam brackets, axlebox guides, wheel centres and eccentric sheaves. The cylinders were each cast in one piece with half of the boiler saddle.

In spite of their totally different appearance and wheel arrangement, the CGR designated these locomotives as 6th Class as well, possibly because they were intended as an "Improved 6th Class".

== First Adriatic tenders ==
The 2-6-4 wheel arrangement was usually used only on tank locomotives, with only three known exceptions. These eight locomotives were the world's first tender engines with the 2-6-4 wheel arrangement. They remained unique in the world until 1908, when the Austro-Hungarian kkStB class 210 express locomotives appeared, followed by their 310 class in 1911, both designed by Karl Gölsdorf. The 2-6-4 type therefore became known as the Adriatic wheel arrangement, named for the Adriatic Sea which bordered Austria-Hungary.

== South African Railways ==
When the Union of South Africa was established on 31 May 1910, the three Colonial government railways (CGR, NGR and CSAR) were united under a single administration to control and administer the railways, ports and harbours of the Union. Although the South African Railways and Harbours came into existence in 1910, the actual classification and renumbering of all the rolling stock of the three constituent railways were only implemented with effect from 1 January 1912.

When they were assimilated into the South African Railways (SAR) in 1912, these locomotives were renumbered in the range from 713 to 720 and designated Class 6Z.

The rest of the CGR's 6th Class locomotives, together with the CSAR's Classes 6-L1 to 6-L3 locomotives which had been inherited from the Oranje-Vrijstaat Gouwerment-Spoorwegen (OVGS) via the Imperial Military Railways (IMR), were grouped into thirteen more sub-classes by the SAR. The 4-6-0 locomotives became Classes 6, 6A to 6H and 6J to 6L, and the 2-6-2 locomotives became Class 6Y.

== Service ==
In SAR service, the eight Class 6Z locomotives gave good service on the Cape mainline and later in suburban service. In their last years, Class 6Z engines were employed to haul mainline passenger trains between Cape Town's Monument Station and the mailship pier in Table Bay harbour. They were withdrawn and scrapped in 1934.

== Illustration ==
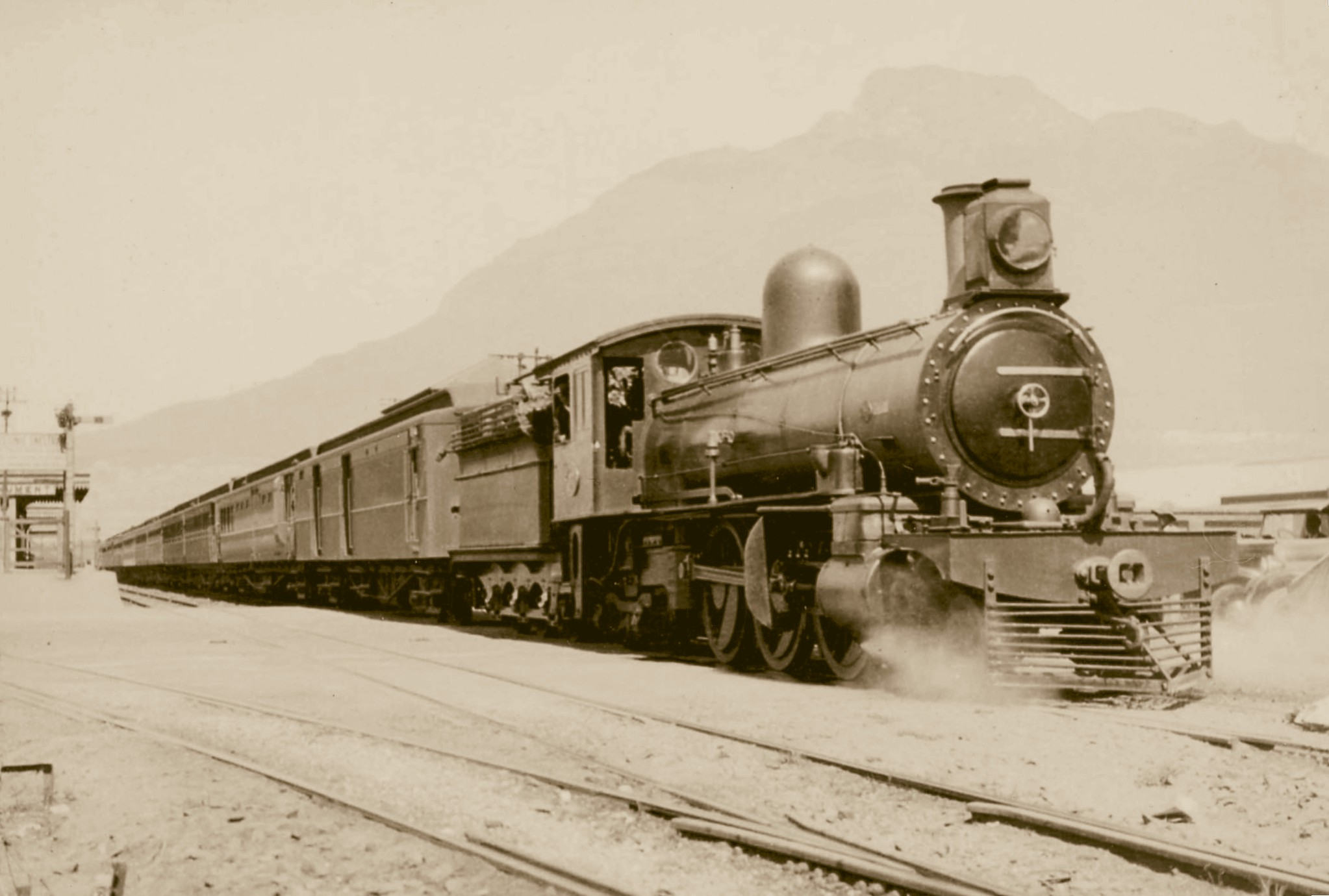
No. 717 on the Union Limited at Monument station, c. 1932

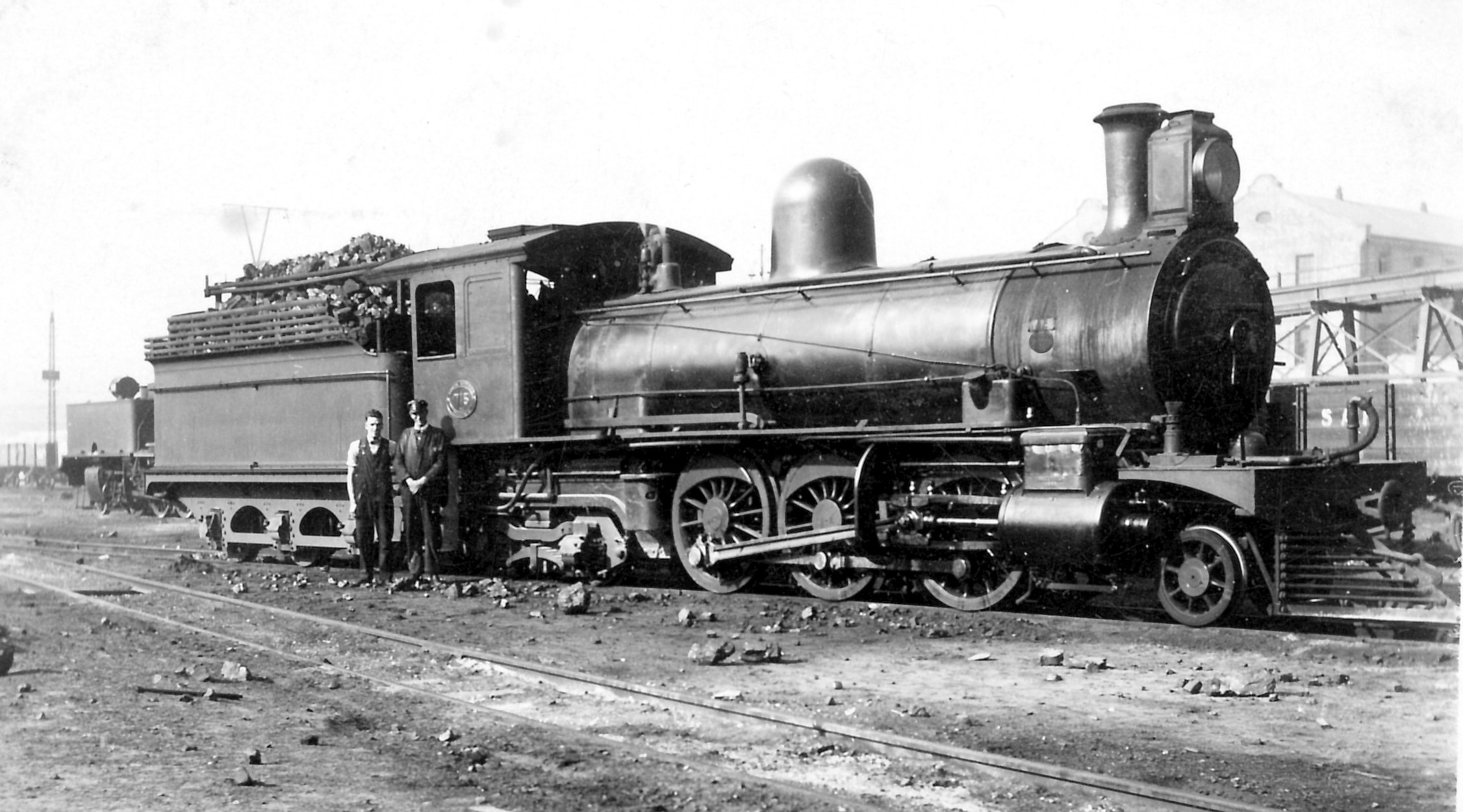
No. 715 with crew, c. 1930
