= Dona Joaninha =

Brazilian steam locomotive

Coordinates: 23°28′24″S 46°31′48″W

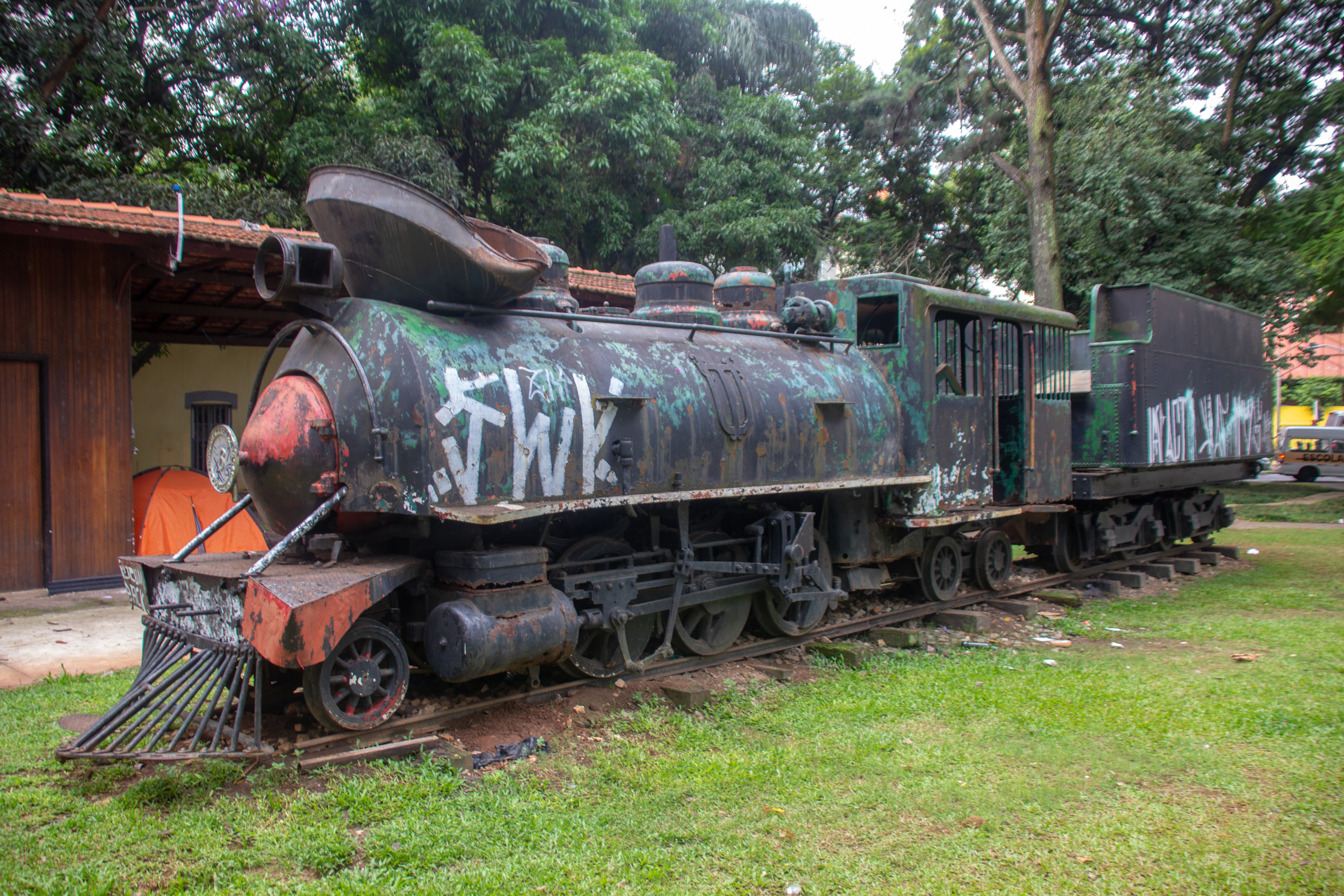
Type and origin
- Power type: Steam
- Builder: Bottene & Filhos
- Build date: 1940
Specifications
- Gauge: 1 metre (3.3 ft)
- Loco weight: 150 tonnes (150 long tons; 170 short tons)
Career
- Retired: 1960s
- Restored: 2020
- Disposition: Static display in Praça IV Centenário, Downtown of Guarulhos, State of São Paulo, Brazil

Dona Joaninha or Estrada de Ferro Sorocabana 6 is a steam locomotive (with the uncommon 2-6-4 wheel arrangement) that is now on static display in Guarulhos, State of São Paulo, Brazil. Constructed in 1940, it was used to move sugar cane across Brazil until the 1960s. A scrap dealer purchased it around 1976, and it was then put on static display around 2000. After falling into disrepair, it was restored in 2020.

== Construction ==
It was the second locomotive constructed by João Bottene of Bottene & Filhos. It was built around the chassis, wheels, and steam pipes of an EFS locomotive, with a new boiler, water tank, cabin, rear bogie, and firewood bunker, assembled in a workshop at Usina Monte Alegre. It used a 1 metre (3.3 ft) gauge, and weighed 150 tonnes, with a pulling capacity of 1300 tonnes. It was named Dona Joaninha after Dona Joana Morganti, who owned the workshop. It was inaugurated in January 1940.

== Operation ==
The locomotive was used to move sugar cane on the Usina Tamoio private railroad, in Araraquara, which ended at the Tamoio station near São Carlos. It was in use until the line closed in the mid-1960s.

== Static display ==
After the line closed, the locomotive was kept on the railroad's premises until around 1976, when it was purchased by a scrap dealer based in Guarulhos. After being moved there, the scrap dealer partnered with the Guarulhos city hall to put the locomotive on display around 2000 in Praça IV Centenário (now known as Praça Paschoal Thomeu), which is at the former location of the Guarulhos Station of the Cantareira Tramway.

While on display in the park, it fell into disrepair, with a tree falling on the chimney, denting it, along with rust and decay due to a lack of maintenance. It is not protected against people climbing on it. Originally painted green when it was installed in the park, it turned black, and then multicoloured through graffiti. Nearby Portuguese pavement was left as a rubble heap. The local government started seeking private funding to repair the locomotive in 2017.

Restoration work started in July 2020, funded by local companies, with coordination by the Secretaria de Meio Ambiente (Sema) but with no funding from the city. Rusted parts were replaced, the chimney repaired, and graffiti removed, before it was repainted and lights installed. It was also enclosed by railings.
