= 2-6-4 =

Locomotive wheel arrangement

2-6-4 (Adriatic)
- Front of locomotive at left

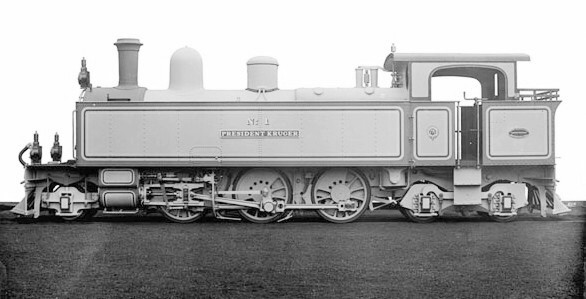
- PPR 55 Tonner 2-6-4T, SAR Class D
Equivalent classifications
- UIC class: 1C2, 1'C2'
- French class: 132
- Turkish class: 36
- Swiss class: 3/6
- Russian class: 1-3-2
First known tank engine version
- First use: 1898
- Country: South Africa
- Locomotive: PPR 55 Tonner
- Railway: Pretoria-Pietersburg Railway
- Designer: Beyer, Peacock & Company
- Builder: Beyer, Peacock & Company
First known tender engine version
- First use: 1901
- Country: Cape of Good Hope
- Locomotive: CGR 6th Class 2-6-4
- Railway: Cape Government Railways
- Designer: Hazlitt Beatty
- Builder: Neilson, Reid & Company
- Evolved from: 2-6-2

Under the Whyte notation for the classification of steam locomotives, a 2-6-4 locomotive has two leading wheels, six coupled driving wheels and four trailing wheels.

== Overview ==
With only a few known exceptions, the Adriatic wheel arrangement was usually used on tank locomotives, for which various suffixes to indicate the type of tank would be added to the wheel arrangement, for example 2-6-4T for an engine with side-tanks.

=== Tender locomotives ===
The earliest known example was the South African Class 6Z, designed by Cape Government Railways (CGR) Chief Locomotive Superintendent Hazlitt Beatty in 1901. The first engines of the class were modified 2-6-2 Prairie locomotives which were equipped with two-axle trailing bogies. In 1902, more were placed in service, but built with the 2-6-4 wheel arrangement. The latter were the first known tender locomotives in the world to be built with this wheel arrangement.

=== Tank locomotives ===
Tank engines with the 2-6-4T wheel arrangement were produced for many different railway systems worldwide and were mainly used for freight and suburban passenger working. They have been less successful on express passenger trains. The earliest known example also originated in South Africa, the Pretoria-Pietersburg Railway's 55 Tonner of 1898.

== Usage ==
=== Austria ===
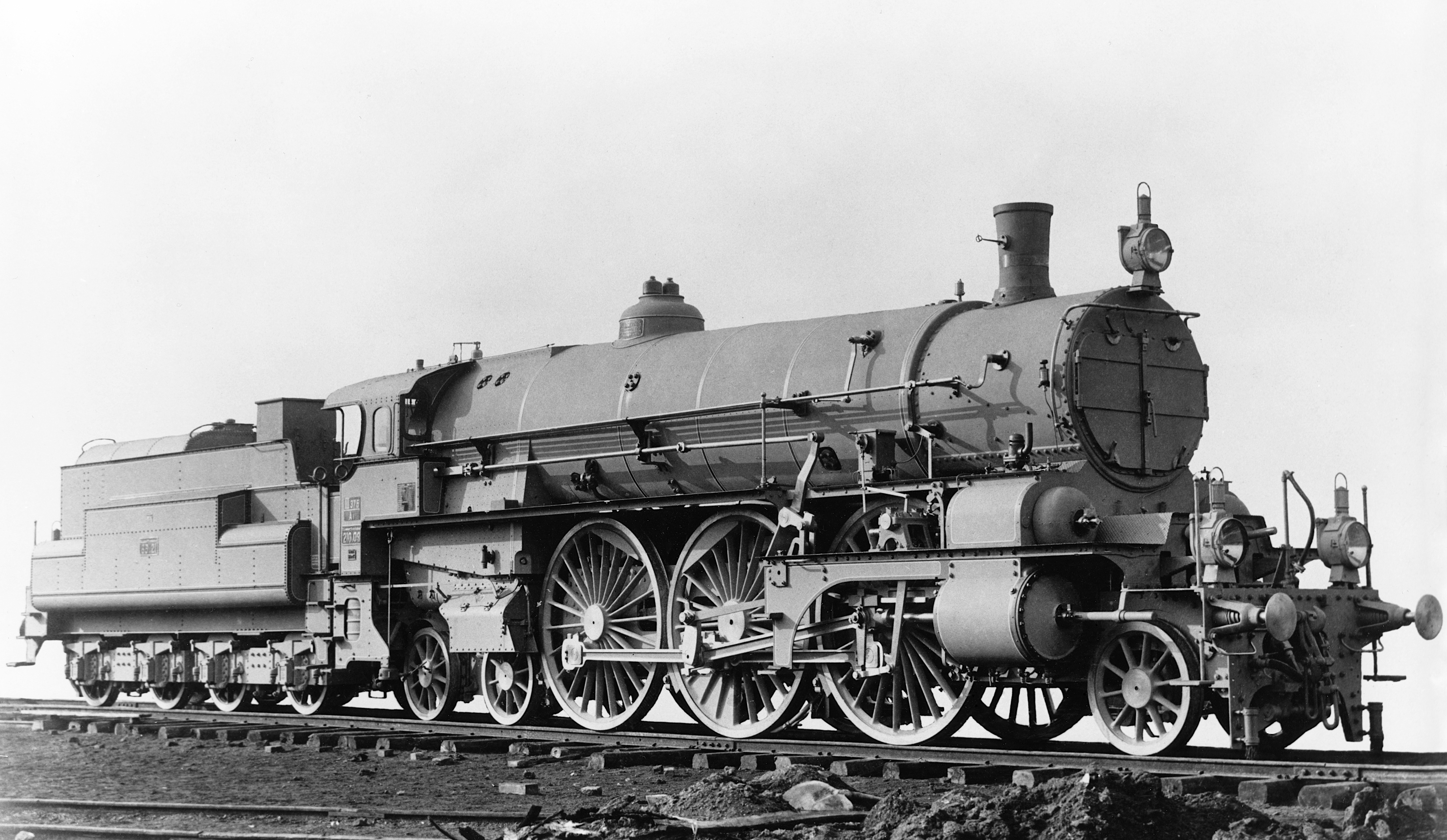
Austrian class 210

Two Austrian express tender locomotive types were of this wheel arrangement, the 210 class of 1908 and 310 class of 1911 designed by Karl Gölsdorf. The type therefore became known as the Adriatic arrangement, named for the Adriatic Sea which bordered Austria-Hungary.

=== Brazil ===
Preserved meter gauge locomotive Dona Joaninha, built to haul sugar cane in Brazil, uses the 2-6-4 wheel arrangement.

=== Finland ===
Class Vk1 2-6-4T no. 305 of the Finnish State Railways

Finland had three locomotive classes with a 2-6-4T wheel arrangement, the Classes Vk1, Vk2 and Vk3. All three classes were nicknamed Iita.

The Class Vk1, numbered 301 to 305, were delivered in 1900 from Baldwin Locomotive Works of Philadelphia, Pennsylvania. The Class Vk1 Iita were also nicknamed Amerikan because they were built in the United States.

The Class Vk2 were numbered 454 to 455.

The Finnish Steam Locomotive Class Vk3 were numbered 456 and 487 to 492. They were built in 1915 by Tampella, a Finnish heavy industry manufacturer, and were used for local passenger duties. One of them, Vk3 No 489, is preserved at the Finnish Railway Museum.

=== Germany ===
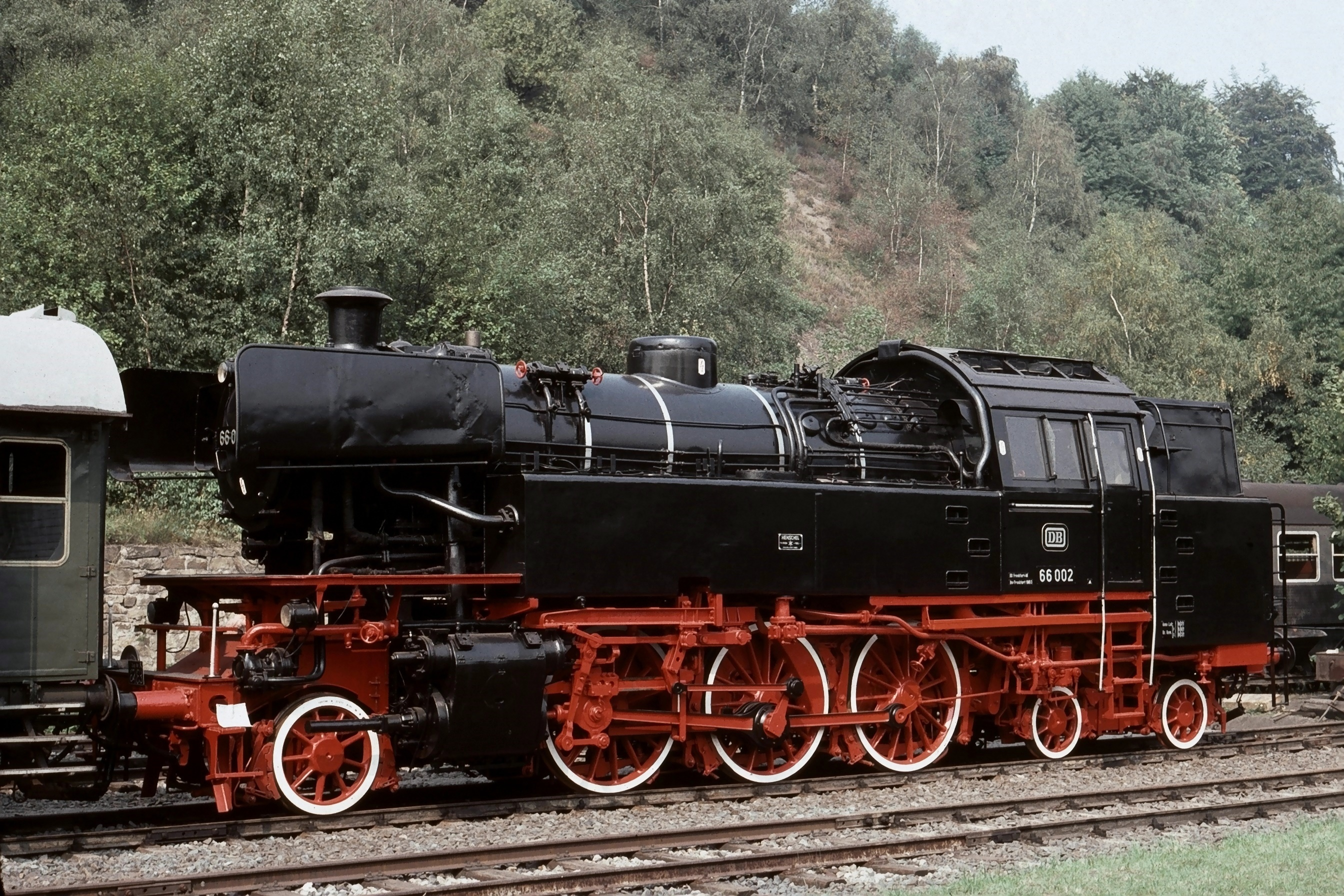
Preserved DB Class 66 002

Two Deutsche Bundesbahn (DB) 2-6-4T Class 66 locomotives, designed for fast goods train and passenger train service, were built in 1955 as part of the DB's Neubaulok construction programme. They were both withdrawn from service in 1968. One, DB 66 002, has been preserved at the Bochum-Dahlhausen Railway Museum.

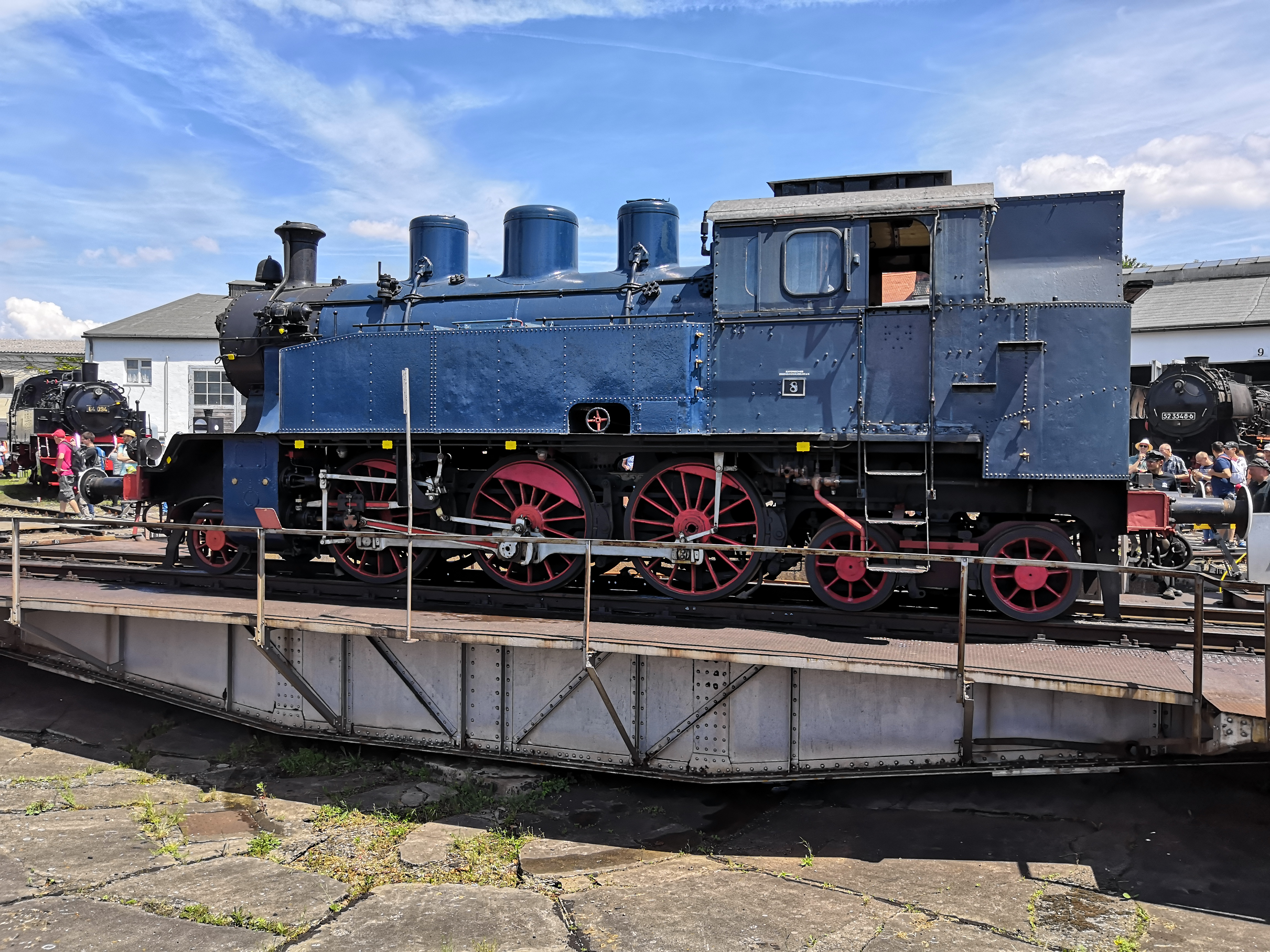
TAG 8

For the private TAG, which operated the railway line from Schaftlach to Tegernsee, the 2-6-4T steam locomotive TAG 8 was built in 1942, using wheels from DRG Class E 79. It was in service until 1970 and has been preserved in the Bavarian Railway Museum.

=== Jamaica ===
Jamaica had two 2-6-4T locomotives built for the Jamaican Government Railway in 1894 by the Rhode Island Locomotive Works numbered 21 and 22. 22 was scrapped in 1907 and 21 was scrapped the following year.

=== Sweden ===
SJ type SB with driving wheels 1.75 m diameter for passenger use, built Motala 1917, one preserved.

SJ type J with driving wheels 1.3 m diameter for mixed traffic use, built Atlas, Motala and Nohab, 1914–1918. Four preserved.

=== Switzerland ===
2-6-4 tank locomotives were built by SLM in 1913 for use on the Berne-Neuenberg railway. They were still in use at Basel in 1956. Of slightly British appearance, at that time they were used to transfer stock between the French and Swiss systems, the former having not yet been electrified.

=== New Zealand ===
The Ferrymead Railway in Christchurch, New Zealand, has a 3 ft 6 in (1,067 mm) gauge 2-6-4T locomotive that was in regular operation until taken off-line for boiler repairs around 2009. It was built by Baldwin Locomotive Works in 1901.

The Wf class of the New Zealand Government Railways was built between 1903 and 1928 and was a general purpose tank design. It was used all over New Zealand and identical locomotives were also in service as the Ds class of the Tasmanian Government Railways. Three Wf class locomotives survived in preservation:

- Wf386, one of the engines used on the first Wellington to Auckland train, is preserved at Paekakariki.
- Wf392 was sold to the Tasmanian Government Railways and used as a Ds class locomotive. Its boiler is on display at Don River Railway
- Wf393 is preserved at Ferrymead Railway.
- Wf403 is preserved at Nelson Railway Society.

=== South Africa ===
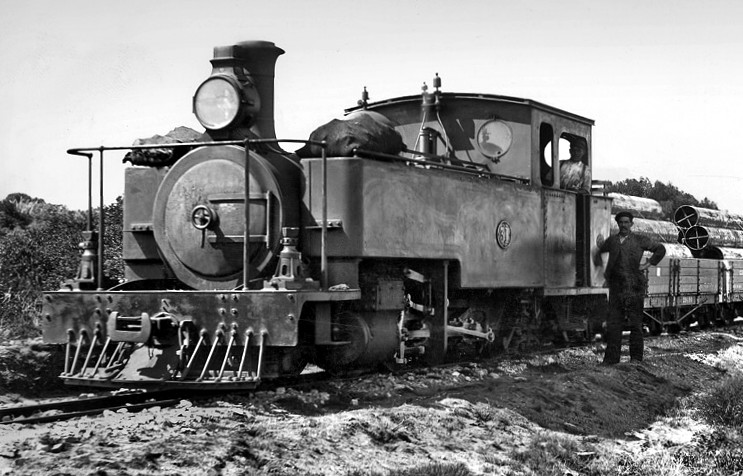
CGR Type A 2-6-4T

Between 1898 and 1900, the Pretoria-Pietersburg Railway (PPR) placed six 2-6-4T locomotives in service, built by Beyer, Peacock & Company. During the Second Boer War, they were first taken over by the Nederlandsche-Zuid-Afrikaansche Spoorwegmaatschappij (NZASM) and then by the Imperial Military Railways (IMR). After the war, they were taken onto the roster of the Central South African Railways (CSAR) and in 1912 they were assimilated into the South African Railways (SAR) as Class D.

In 1901, the CGR placed four 6th Class 2-6-2 Prairie tender steam locomotives in service, designed at the Salt River works of the CGR and built by Neilson, Reid & Company. During trials, it was found that they were inclined to be unsteady at speed and the locomotive design was therefore modified to a 2-6-4 wheel arrangement by replacing the trailing carrier wheels with a two-axle bogie. Another four locomotives incorporating this modification were ordered later in 1901 and delivered in 1902, the first tender locomotives in the world to be built with this wheel arrangement. The change in design resulted in a marked improvement in the locomotive's stability at speed and the first four locomotives were therefore also modified accordingly. In 1912, when they were assimilated into the SAR, these eight locomotives were all designated Class 6Z.

In 1902, the CGR placed two Type A Adriatic narrow gauge locomotive in construction service on the Avontuur branch, which was being built out of Port Elizabeth through the Langkloof. They were built by Manning Wardle and, at a width of 7 feet 9 inches (2.362 metres), they were the widest locomotives to see service on any of the 2 feet (610 millimetres) narrow gauge lines in South Africa.

=== United Kingdom ===
The first British examples of the 2-6-4T wheel arrangement were two locomotives built for the narrow-gauge Leek & Manifold Valley Light Railway in 1904. The first 4 ft 8 1/2 in (1,435 mm) standard gauge examples were the class 1B of the Great Central Railway, built in 1914.

Richard Maunsell of the South Eastern and Chatham Railway (SECR) designed the K class in 1914 for express passenger duties, and in 1925 introduced a three-cylinder variant K1 class for the Southern Railway. These locomotives proved to be unsteady at speed and, following the Sevenoaks railway accident in 1927, they were rebuilt as 2-6-0 tender locomotives. Maunsell did however use the type more successfully for his W class freight locomotives of 1930.

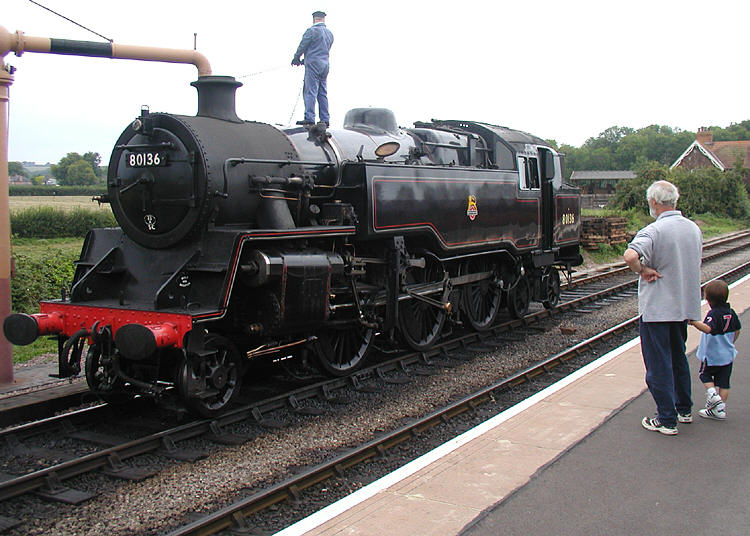
BR Standard Class 4 2-6-4T No. 80136

Between 1927 and 1947, the London, Midland and Scottish Railway (LMS) built nearly five hundred 2-6-4Ts for suburban passenger work to four similar designs (see LMS/BR Class 4 2-6-4T locomotives). The last of these, the LMS Fairburn, continued to be built by British Railways (BR) until 1951. Fairburn's LMS design also formed the basis of the very successful BR Standard Class 4, which continued to be produced until 1957.

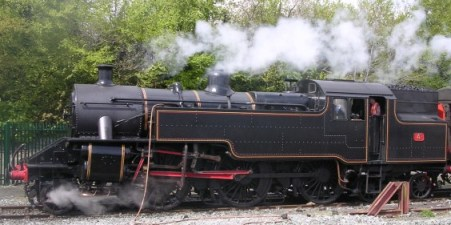
Preserved NCC WT class no. 4

Between 1946 and 1950, George Ivatt of the LMS also built eighteen 5 ft 3 in (1,600 mm) examples of a very similar design at Derby Works, for use in Northern Ireland. These later became the Northern Counties Committee WT class.

A prototype of the London and North Eastern Railway (LNER) L1 class, designed by Edward Thompson, was built in 1945. The remaining 99 members of the class were built under British Railways administration during the period from 1948 to 1950.

=== United States ===
The 2-6-4 wasn't a very popular wheel arrangement in the United States, but a few railroads were known to have used it at certain points.

The Reading Railroad used three similar classes of 2-6-4RT locomotives for commuter service classed as Q-1b, Q-1c and Q-1d built by the Baldwin Locomotive Works between 1903-1904 and 1920. 11 were built numbered from 376-385.

The Illinois Central Railroad used 2-6-4T locomotives for use on commuter service in three classes. The 1422 class (formerly the 231 class), two of which were built in 1892 by the American Locomotive Company at their Schenectady Works, the 1441 class built in 1912 by the IC themselves, eight of which were rebuilt from earlier 2-6-0 locomotives, and the 1449 class built in 1920, eight of which were built by the Rogers Locomotive and Machine Works.

The Chattanooga and Lookout Mountain Railway used a 2-6-4T built by the Brooks Locomotive Works in 1888. It was numbered 1 and was the only locomotive to be used on the C&LM. Not much else regarding this locomotive is known.

== Model railroading ==
The Lionel Corporation used the 2-6-4 wheel arrangement in many of its model steam locomotives, including the 2037 used in the infamous pastel-coloured Girls' Train. Their 2-6-4 model was based on the Pennsylvania Railroad’s K4 class Pacific, even though this was a 4-6-2 rather than a 2-6-4.
