= KkStB 6 =

Class of 68 passenger locomotives

kkStB 6 BBÖ 6 / ČSD 264.0 / PKP Pd12
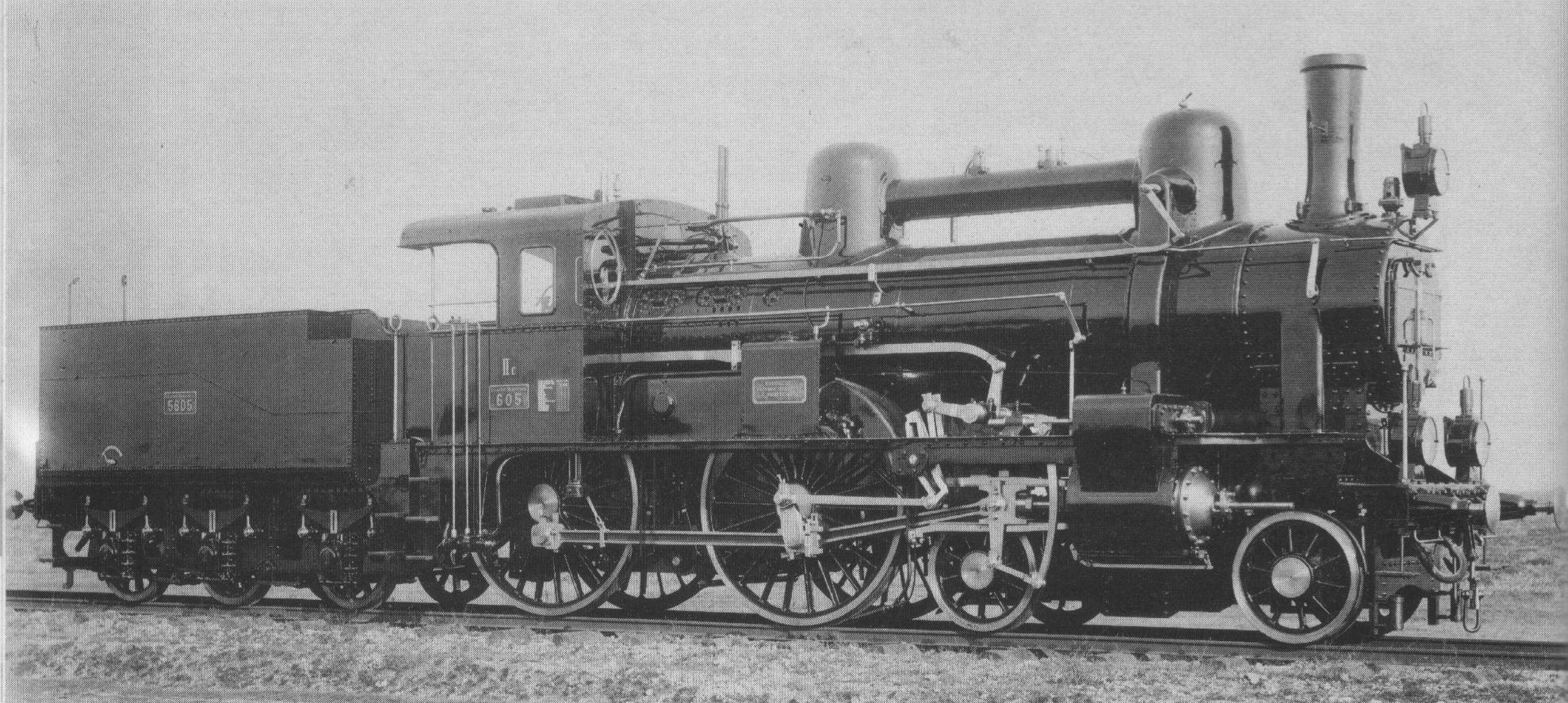
- kkStB 6.05
Type and origin
- Builder: Lokomotivfabrik Floridsdorf (24); Wiener Neustädter Lokomotivfabrik (20); Lokomotivfabrik der StEG (24)
- Build date: 1894–1898
- Total produced: kkStB: 68; BBÖ: 20 (from kkStB); ČSD: 28 (from kkStB); PKP: 9 (from kkStB)
Specifications
- Configuration
  - Whyte: 4-4-0
- Gauge: 1,435 mm (4 ft 8 1/2 in)
- Leading dia.: 1,024 mm (3 ft 4 3/8 in)
- Driver dia.: 2,120 mm (6 ft 11 1/2 in)
- Wheelbase
  - Overall: 7,300 mm (23 ft 11 1/2 in)
- Length: 10,007 mm (32 ft 10 in)
- Adhesive weight: 28.8 t (28.3 long tons; 31.7 short tons)
- Empty weight: 50.1 t (49.3 long tons; 55.2 short tons)
- Service weight: 56.1 t (55.2 long tons; 61.8 short tons)
- Boiler
- No. of heating tubes: 205
- Boiler pressure: 13 kgf/cm^{2} (1,270 kPa; 185 lbf/in^{2})
- Heating surface
  - Firebox: 2.90 m^{2} (31.2 sq ft)
  - Radiative: 11.00 m^{2} (118.4 sq ft)
  - Tubes: 144.50 m^{2} (1,555.4 sq ft)
- Cylinders: 2
- High-pressure cylinder: 500 mm (19 11/16 in)
- Low-pressure cylinder: 740 mm (29 1/8 in)
- Piston stroke: 680 mm (26 3/4 in)
Performance figures
- Maximum speed: 90 km/h (56 mph)
Career
- Numbers: kkStB 6.01–6.68; BBÖ 6.15…6.58 (from kkStB, with gaps); ČSD 264.001 – 264.028; PKP Pd12-1 – Pd12-9
- Retired: BBÖ: by 1932; ČSD: by 1938

The kkStB 6 was a class of 68 express passenger 4-4-0 locomotives of the Imperial Royal Austrian State Railways (kaiserlich-königliche österreichische Staatsbahnen or kkStB).

== History ==
The kkStB 6 war the first design by Karl Gölsdorf in kkStB drawing office. Since the express train locomotives used in the 1890s were too weak due to increasing train weights, Gölsdorf designed the considerably more powerful 6 series as a compound locomotive to replace the kkStB 4. The boiler pitch was 500 mm (19 3/4 in) higher on the 6 series compared to the 4. The 6 series was a resounding success; they could be driven at 130 km/h (81 mph) without problem, continuous power output was 800 PS (588 kW; 789 hp) and peak output was 1,000 PS (735 kW; 986 hp). On the level, they could pull 210 t (210 long tons; 230 short tons) at 100 km/h (62 mph); on a 10‰ grade (1% or 1:100) the speed did not drop below 58 km/h (36 mph). The maximum permitted speed was set at 90 km/h (56 mph). A total of 68 locomotives were delivered by Lokomotivfabrik Floridsdorf (24), Wiener Neustädter Lokomotivfabrik (20) and Lokomotivfabrik der StEG (24).

With the 6 series, the travel time between Vienna and Prague could be reduced from twelve to eight hours. The locomotives were also used on the Vienna–Eger, Prague–Linz and Vienna–Salzburg routes. They also hauled the Orient-Express, the Ostend-Vienna Express and the spa trains to Karlovy Vary.

After the First World War, 20 locomotives passed to the Federal Railways of Austria (Bundesbahnen Österreich, BBÖ). 28 locomotives went to the Czechoslovak State Railways (ČSD) as their class 264.0. The Polish State Railways (PKP) inherited 9 locomotives as class Pd12. The remaining locomotives were war losses or were eliminated before they were included in the series schemes of the various railway companies. The BBÖ retired its last locomotive in 1932, the ČSD its last in 1938.
