= South African Class D 2-6-4T =

1898 design of steam locomotive

PPR 55 Tonner 2-6-4T NZASM 55 Tonner 2-6-4T IMR 55 Tonner 2-6-4T CSAR Class D 2-6-4T South African Class D 2-6-4T
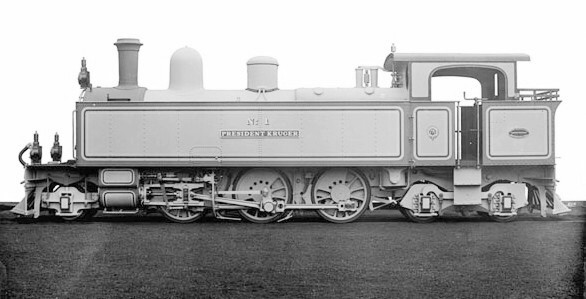
- Pretoria-Pietersburg Railway no. 1 President Kruger, CSAR Class D no. 209, SAR Class D no. 56
Type and origin
- Power type: Steam
- Designer: Beyer, Peacock & Company
- Builder: Beyer, Peacock & Company
- Order number: 8210, 8491
- Serial number: 3943–3946, 3948, 4127
- Model: PPR 55 Tonner
- Build date: 1897, 1900
- Total produced: 7
Specifications
- Configuration
  - Whyte: 2-6-4T
- Driver: 2nd coupled axle
- Gauge: 3 ft 6 in (1,067 mm) Cape gauge
- Leading dia.: 30 in (762 mm)
- Coupled dia.: 46 in (1,168 mm)
- Trailing dia.: 30 in (762 mm)
- Wheelbase: 28 ft 3 1/2 in (8,623 mm)
  - Coupled: 10 ft 2 in (3,099 mm)
  - Trailing: 5 ft 3 in (1,600 mm)
- Length
  - Over couplers: 35 ft 6 3/4 in (10,839 mm)
- Height: 12 ft 3 in (3,734 mm)
- Frame type: Plate
- Axle load: 11 LT 10 cwt (11,680 kg)
  - Leading: 7 LT 15 cwt (7,874 kg)
  - Coupled: 11 LT 10 cwt (11,680 kg)
  - Trailing: 13 LT 5 cwt (13,460 kg)
- Adhesive weight: 34 LT 10 cwt (35,050 kg)
- Loco weight: 55 LT 10 cwt (56,390 kg)
- Fuel type: Coal
- Fuel capacity: 3 LT (3.0 t)
- Water cap.: 1,540 imp gal (7,000 L)
- Firebox
  - Type: Belpaire
  - Grate area: 16.8 sq ft (1.56 m^{2})
- Boiler
  - Pitch: 6 ft 6 in (1,981 mm)
  - Diameter: 4 ft 3/4 in (1,238 mm)
  - Tube plates: 10 ft 3 11/16 in (3,142 mm)
  - Small tubes: 185: 1 3/4 in (44 mm)
- Boiler pressure: 170 psi (1,172 kPa)
- Safety valve: Ramsbottom
- Heating surface
  - Firebox: 94.7 sq ft (8.80 m^{2})
  - Tubes: 871.9 sq ft (81.00 m^{2})
  - Total surface: 966.6 sq ft (89.80 m^{2})
- Cylinders: Two
- Cylinder size: 16 in (406 mm) bore 22 in (559 mm) stroke
- Valve gear: Walschaerts
- Valve type: Slide
- Couplers: Johnston link-and-pin
Performance figures
- Tractive effort: 15,610 lbf (69.4 kN) @ 75%
Career
- Operators: Pretoria-Pietersburg Railway; NZASM; Imperial Military Railways; Central South African Railways; South African Railways
- Class: PPR 55 Tonner; CSAR & SAR Class D
- Number in class: 6
- Numbers: PPR 1-6; CSAR 209-214; SAR 56-61
- Delivered: 1898, 1900
- First run: 1898
- Withdrawn: 1930

The South African Railways Class D 2-6-4T of 1898 was a steam locomotive from the pre-Union era in Transvaal.

Between 1898 and 1900, the Pretoria-Pietersburg Railway placed six 55 Tonner 2-6-4T "Adriatic" type tank steam locomotives in service. During the Second Boer War, the Transvaal government took possession of the railway and it was operated as part of the Netherlands-South African Railway Company, until the Imperial Military Railways took over all railway operations in the Zuid-Afrikaansche Republiek.

At the end of the war, these locomotives were taken onto the roster of the Central South African Railways, renumbered and designated Class D. In 1912, when these engines were assimilated into the South African Railways, they were renumbered once again, but retained their Class D classification.

== The Pretoria-Pietersburg Railway ==
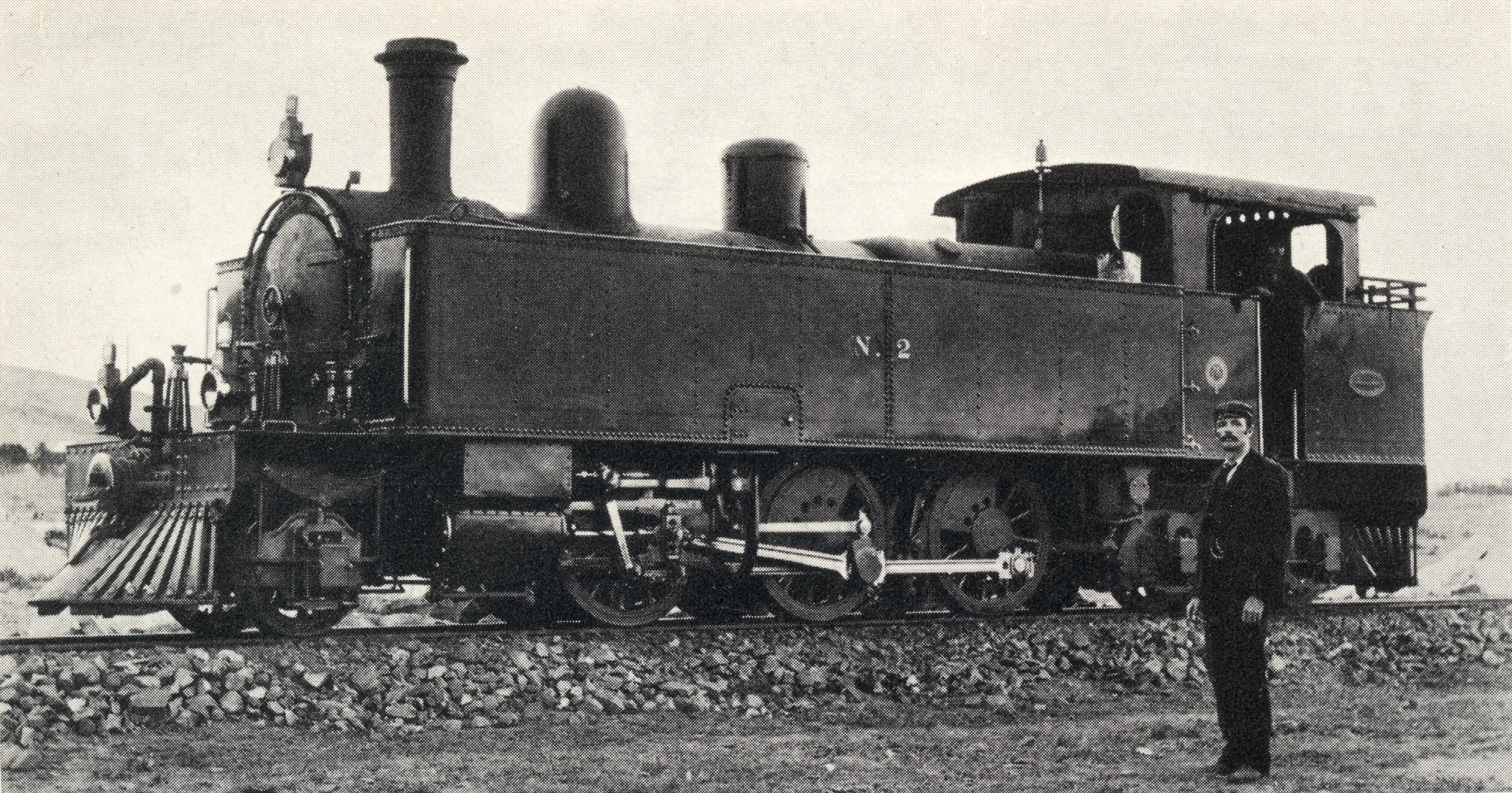
Pretoria-Pietersburg Railway no. 2 in service, c. 1898

The Pretoria-Pietersburg Railway (PPR) was a private railway which operated between Pretoria West via Warmbad and Nylstroom to Pietersburg. It was constructed under a concession granted by the government of the South African Republic (ZAR) to Hendrik Jacobus Schoeman on 30 October 1895. Construction commenced in 1897 and the railway was opened to traffic as far as Nylstroom by 1 July 1898. Potgietersrus was reached on 1 October 1898 and Pietersburg on 1 May 1899.

== Manufacturer ==
In 1897, the PPR ordered six 2-6-4T locomotives from Beyer, Peacock & Company. At the time, these locomotives were amongst the most advanced designs yet to be seen in South Africa.

== Characteristics ==
The locomotives were the first in South Africa to be equipped with Belpaire fireboxes. The cylinders were arranged outside the plate frames, while the valves were arranged above the cylinders and actuated by Walschaerts valve gear.

== Service ==
=== Pretoria-Pietersburg Railway ===
Five of the six locomotives were delivered to the PPR in 1898. They were to be numbered in the range from 1 to 6, but no. 5 was lost at sea. No. 6 was therefore renumbered to no. 5 to rectify the gap in the numbering sequence and a replacement for the lost locomotive was ordered from Beyer, Peacock & Company.

Of these locomotives, no. 1 was the only one to be named. It bore the name President Kruger in cast brass plates on the tank sides.

=== NZASM ===
As a result of the outbreak of the Second Boer War in 1899, the ZAR government took possession of the PPR and its rolling stock in October 1899, just five months after completion of the railway. The line was then briefly worked by the Nederlandsche-Zuid-Afrikaansche Spoorweg-Maatschappij (NZASM), until that railway was itself seized by the Imperial Military Railways (IMR) by the end of the same year.

With these locomotives being the only mainline engines to actually see service on the PPR, and with the railway only being in existence for five months before it was taken possession of by the NZASM, it was not officially classified. For lack of a classification, they are referred to as 55 Tonners, since the NZASM also classified its own locomotives according to their weight.

=== Imperial Military Railways ===
At the outbreak of the war, control of all railways in the Cape of Good Hope and Colony of Natal was taken over by the invading British military. It was operated by the IMR, which was established on 7 October 1899 upon the appointment of Lieutenant Colonel E.P.C. Girouard KCMG DSO RE as Director of Railways for the South African Field Forces. While Girouard largely left control of the Cape Government Railways (CGR) and the Natal Government Railways (NGR) in the hands of the civilian staff, the railway lines of the Oranje-Vrijstaat Gouwerment-Spoorwegen (OVGS) in the Orange Free State and of the NZASM and its recently seized PPR in the ZAR came under the IMR's control as possession was obtained of their lines.

The replacement sixth locomotive was delivered to the IMR in 1900 and became the new no. 6.

=== Central South African Railways ===
Hostilities ceased on 1 June 1902. On 1 July 1902, the IMR was transferred to civilian control and became the Central South African Railways (CSAR). These six locomotives were taken onto its roster, designated the CSAR's Class D and renumbered in the range from 209 to 214.

During 1904, all six locomotives were upgraded by the CSAR by having their cylinder diameter increased by 1 inch (25 millimetres), which improved their hauling capacity by 15%. This resulted in the engines being able to haul the same load as a 7th Class locomotive.

=== South African Railways ===
When the Union of South Africa was established on 31 May 1910, the three Colonial government railways (CGR, NGR and CSAR) were united under a single administration to control and administer the railways, ports and harbours of the Union. Although the South African Railways and Harbours came into existence in 1910, the actual classification and renumbering of all the rolling stock of the three constituent railways were only implemented with effect from 1 January 1912.

In 1912, these six locomotives retained their Class D designation on the South African Railways (SAR), but they were renumbered once again, in the range from 56 to 61. In SAR service, the Class D was used on suburban traffic on the Witwatersrand and in the Western Cape. They gave good service until they were withdrawn from service and scrapped in 1930.

== Works numbers ==
The Class D works numbers and renumbering are listed in the table.

Class D 2-6-4T
Works no.	Year built	PPR no.	IMR no.	CSAR no.	SAR no.
3943	1897	1	1	209	56
3944	1897	2	2	210	57
3945	1897	3	3	211	58
3946	1897	4	4	212	59
3948	1897	5	5	213	61
4127	1900		6	214	60
