= Karl Gölsdorf =

Austrian railway engineer

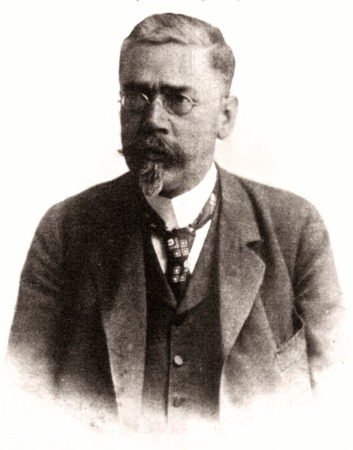
- Born: 8 June 1861; Vienna
- Died: 18 March 1916 (aged 54); Wolfsbergkogel, Semmering, Austria
- Occupation(s): engineer and locomotive designer

Karl Gölsdorf (8 June 1861 – 18 March 1916) was an Austrian engineer and locomotive designer.

== Early life ==
Karl Gölsdorf was born on 8 June 1861 in Vienna, the son of Louis Adolf Gölsdorf. Even as a schoolboy he was introduced to locomotive design by his father, the chief mechanical engineer (Maschinendirektor) of the Imperial and Royal Southern Railway (k.u.k. Südbahn). From 1880 to 1884, he attended the Vienna Technical High School and completed his diploma with distinction. In 1885, he joined the Wiener Maschinenfabrik (Vienna engineering works) as a chief design engineer. In 1889, he became head of assembly for locomotive construction. On 1 November 1891, he joined the design office of the Austrian State Railway as an engineer-Adjunkt and began his creative work there.

== Inventions ==
In 1893, he invented an effective starting system for compound locomotives. Until then, the locomotive starting systems in common use in Austria, with its sometimes taxing railway lines, didn't enable trains to be started reliably. Also thanks to Gölsdorf was the practical idea that a higher boiler pitch on steam locomotives had no real disadvantages. A study visit to England in 1899 was to heavily influence the use of form in his designs.

Gölsdorf became especially well known as a result of his inventing the radially-sliding coupled axle for steam locomotives, the so-called Gölsdorf axle. The first steam engine to be equipped with this was an eight-coupled steam locomotive in 1897, the class 170.The ten-coupled class 180, whose first, third and fifth axles were all able to slide sideways in the frame, demonstrated that, in almost all cases, locomotives with multi-part frames and complicated articulated designs would be superfluous. From that time forward, this type of construction became the standard for heavy goods locomotives.

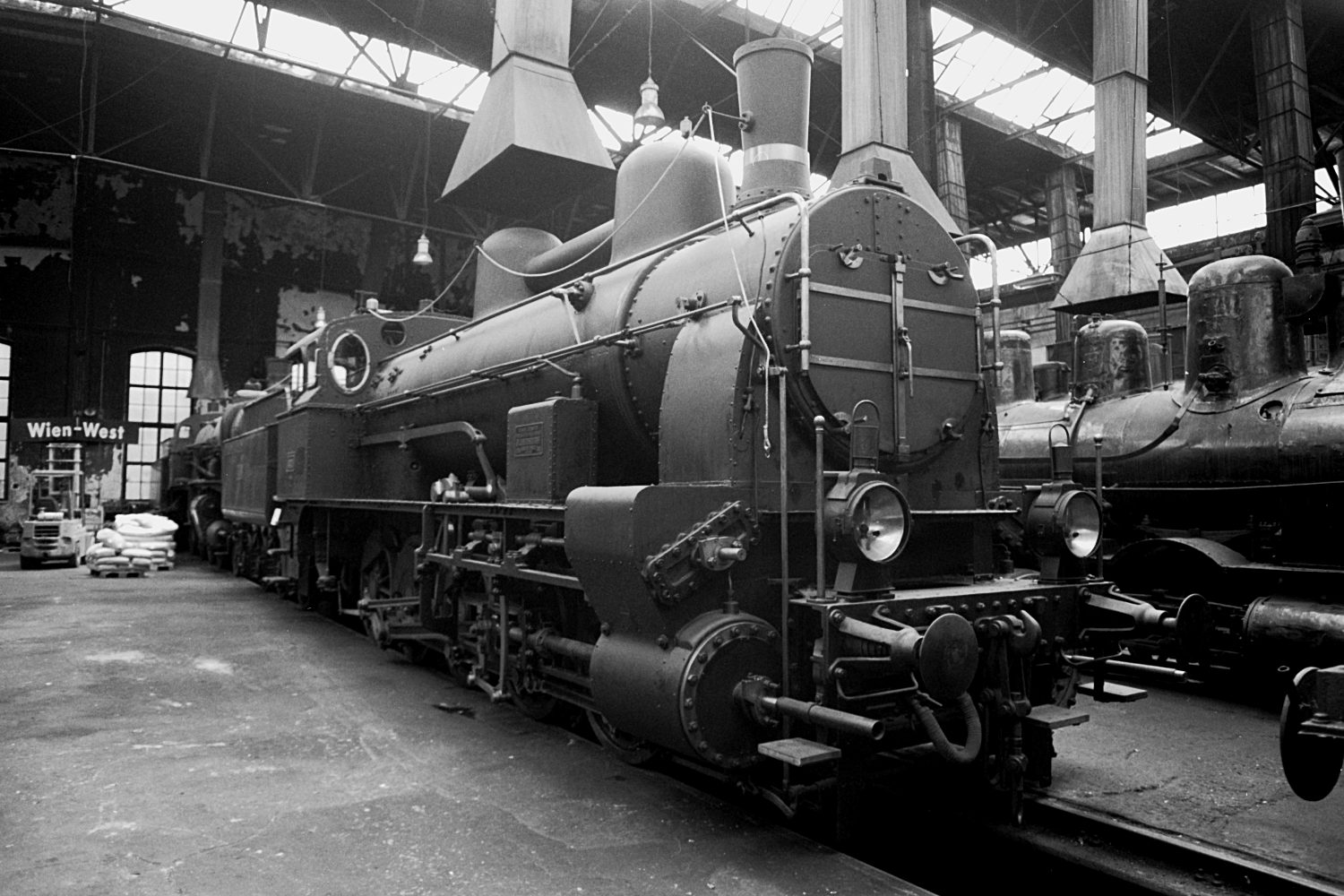
No. 180.01 in Strasshof Railway Museum

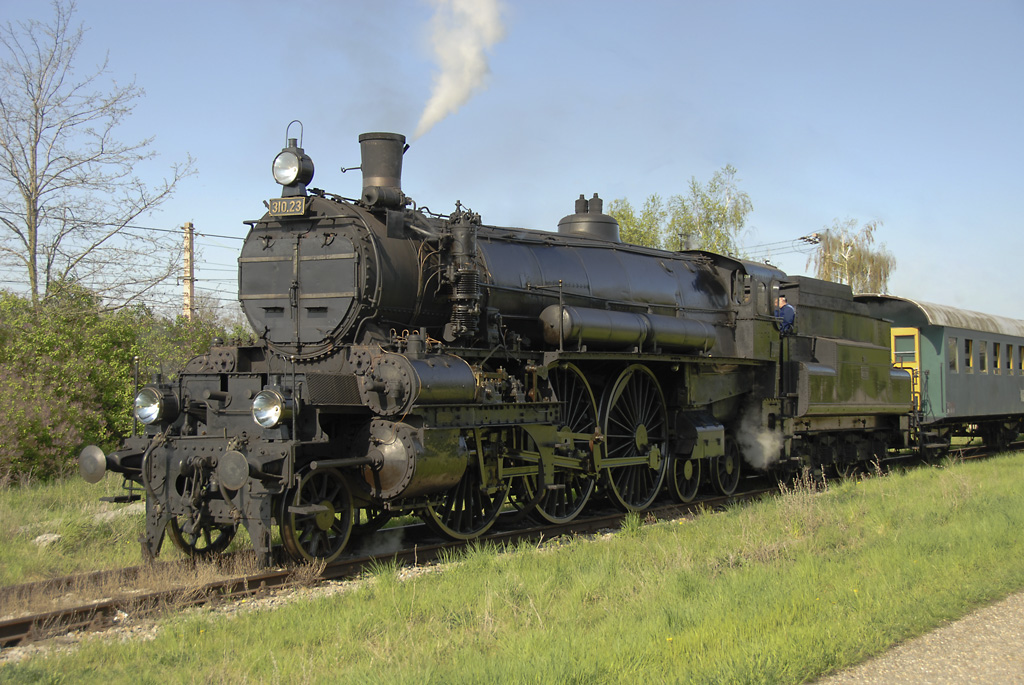
Gölsdorf's 'masterpiece', the kkStB 310, now preserved

From 1893 to 1916, Karl Gölsdorf was the chief design engineer of the Imperial Royal Austrian State Railways (kaiserlich-königlichen österreichischen Staatsbahnen or kkStB) and developed 25 different classes of steam locomotive (in 47 variants) during his career. Amongst his designs were such well-known types as the class 30 operated by the Vienna Stadtbahn, the Atlantics of classes 108 and 308, and the ten-coupled class 380. Notable 'special' designs included the rack railway steam locomotives of class 269 for the Erzbergbahn and the narrow gauge Yv for the Ybbstalbahn.

Karl Gölsdorf continually utilized the emerging technologies of the time. His class 310 locomotive of 1911, a six-coupled express locomotive with a four-cylinder, superheated compound engine, was one of the most elegant of its day and, since the reactivation of no. 310.23 in 1986, currently the most well-known product of the Austrian design engineer.

As a result of his inventions, in 1910, he was made a Doctor of Engineering at Hannover Technical University. In 1913, he was appointed as department head. Karl Gölsdorf was an active member of the German Railway Administrations Union and also brought his expertise to bear as the co-publisher of the paper Eisenbahntechnik der Gegenwart (Railway Technology Today). His collection of photographs earned special fame in connexion with this; it was owned today by the Deutsches Museum.

== Death ==
Karl Gölsdorf died unexpectedly on 18 March 1916 at Wolfsbergkogel whilst staying in Semmering, Austria, of an acute throat infection and not, as incorrectly reported in media at the time, from the consequences of an accident with a locomotive.

== Citations ==
The saying that "you can't save a tonne of weight on a locomotive - but you can save a kilo in a thousand places" (Man kann an einer Lokomotive nicht eine Tonne Gewicht einsparen - wohl aber an tausend Stellen ein Kilo) is attributed to Gölsdorf.

== Preservation ==
Two members of Gölsdorf's magnificent 310 class survive in preservation today, one of which is operational. 310.23 is owned and operated by the Strasshoff Railway Museum.

== See also ==
- List of railway pioneers
