= List of railway pioneers =

A railway pioneer is someone who has made a significant contribution to the historical development of the railway (US: railroad). This definition includes locomotive engineers, railway construction engineers, operators of railway companies, major railway investors and politicians, of national and international importance for the development of rail transport.

Where possible, inclusion in this list should be justified by an appropriate reference (see talk page).

== Technical development of the railways ==
=== Austria ===
Name	Notability	References
John Baillie	first sprung buffers (so-called Bailliesche Schneckenfeder or conical springs)	
Johann Brotan	inventor of the Brotan boiler, the only watertube boiler used in any number on the railways	
Anton Elbel	Gepäcklokomotive, locomotive with luggage compartment.	
Wilhelm Engerth	Engerth locomotive	
Franz Anton von Gerstner	worked on first railway in Austria; builder of Tsarskoye Selo Railway	
Carl Ritter von Ghega	builder of Semmering railway	
Adolph Giesl-Gieslingen	developer of the Giesl ejectors	
Karl Gölsdorf	first six-coupled steam locomotive and inventor of the Gölsdorf axle system	
Louis Adolf Gölsdorf	Gepäcklokomotive	
John Haswell	first steam brake, sheet steel firebox	
Hugo Lentz	inventor of award-winning improvements to steam engines, e.g. steam valve gear with oscillating and rotating cams to actuate poppet valves	
Julius Lott	chief construction engineer of the Arlbergbahn	
Franz Xaver Riepl	geologist, railway and metallurgical expert	
Johann Rihosek	classification scheme for the Imperial Royal Austrian State Railways (kkStB), brakes, spark arrestors	
Baron Albert von Rothschild	founder, Austria's first steam railway, 1839	
Rudolf Sanzin	measurement techniques	
Matthias Schönerer	railway pioneer	
Joseph Terlicher	railway pioneer	
Carl Wurmb	builder of the Tauernbahn	

=== Germany ===
Name	Notability	References
August von Borries	compound working and the first Prussian compound locomotive in 1880	
August Borsig	early locomotives built in Germany, Borsig-Werke	
Karl Gustav Brescius	railway construction in Saxony	
Friedrich Wilhelm Eckhardt	head of BMAG design office, chief designer of DRG Class 44 and 86 and inventor of Schwartzkopff-Eckhardt II bogie.	
Robert Garbe	Prussian mechanical engineer, many classic locomotive designs	
Richard Hartmann	German steam locomotive manufacturer, Sächsische Maschinenfabrik in Chemnitz	
Richard von Helmholtz	German engineer, designer of the Krauss-Helmholtz bogie	
Edmund Heusinger von Waldegg	independently designed the Walschaerts valve gear (hence aka the Heusinger valve gear)	
Hermann Kemper	patent for maglev train technology	
Georg Knorr	considerably improved compressed air brake	
Georg Krauss	founder of Lokomotivfabrik Krauss & Co. in Munich, later part of Krauss-Maffei	
Johann Friedrich Krigar	first locomotive built in the German states at the Königliche Eisengießerei Berlin in 1815	
Alfred Krupp	discovery of seamless tyres for railway wheels in 1852	
Adolf Klose	chief mechanical engineer of the Royal Württemberg State Railways, designer	
Franz Kruckenberg	engineer and designer of the Schienenzeppelin	
Alfred Lent	railway construction in Prussia (including the Magdeburg-Halberstadt railway), chief civil engineer for the Berlin Lehrter Bahnhof	
Joseph Anton von Maffei	German steam locomotive manufacturer	
Oskar von Miller	engineer, driving force for electrified lines in Bavaria, founder of the Deutsches Museum	
Walter Reichel	pantograph, electric locomotives	
Friedrich Sauthoff	Sauthoff's resistance formula for train motion	
Ferdinand Schichau	Schichau-Werke	
Wilhelm Schmidt	hot steam Schmidt, developer of the superheated steam technology	
Johann Andreas Schubert	first practical German steam locomotive Saxonia 1839	
Werner von Siemens	first electric locomotive, Siemens-Werke	
Moritz Stambke	development of the German state railway norms	
Johann Stumpf	best known for popularising the uniflow steam engine around 1909	
Max Maria von Weber	railway engineer and author	
Richard Paul Wagner	Chief of Design for Deutsche Reichsbahn 1922–1942; responsible for standard locomotive designs (Einheitslokomotiven)	
Hans Wendler	railway engineer in the GDR, Wendler coal-dust firing system	
Gustav Wittfeld	1855 – 1923, developments on steam locomotives and electric railway vehicles	
Johann Friedrich Ludwig Wöhlert	1797 – 1877l early German industrialist and locomotive manufacturer in Berlin.	

=== Switzerland ===
- Roman Abt, Abt rack railway system, points for funicular railways
- Jakob Buchli development of single-axle drive, Buchli drive
- Bruno Hildebrand, founder and CEO of the Swiss Northeastern Railway.
- Emil Huber-Stockar, pioneer of the electric traction with high-tension, low frequency AC
- Eduard Locher, rack with horizontal engagement
- Anatole Mallet, Mallet locomotive
- Niklaus Riggenbach, first mountain railway in Europe with rack system, steam locomotive braking system
- Emil Strub, Strub rack railway system
- René Thury, engineer, "King of DC", experimental rack railway in 1884 at Montreux, responsible for many inventions especially involving series coupling of electric motors

=== United Kingdom ===
- William Adams (1823–1904), locomotive superintendent of North London Railway, 1858–1873; Great Eastern Railway 1873–1878 and London & South Western Railway 1878–1895, inventor of Adams bogie
- William Bridges Adams (1797–1872), author, inventor and locomotive engineer. Inventor of Adams axle
- John Blenkinsop, first locomotives with rack system and rack rails
- Charles Beyer, designer, co-founder and manager of Beyer, Peacock & Company for many years
- Louis Brennan, inventor of a monorail
- Isambard Kingdom Brunel, railway pioneer, construction of the Great Western Railway
- Oliver Bulleid, unorthodox locomotive designer, CME of Southern Railway, designed the most powerful Pacifics in Britain
- Thomas Russell Crampton, Crampton locomotive
- Robert Francis Fairlie, Fairlie locomotive
- Sir John Fowler, 1st Baronet, London railway, locomotives
- Herbert William Garratt, inventor of the Garratt locomotive
- Nigel Gresley, designer of world-record holding locomotive, Mallard
- Timothy Hackworth, built Hedley's Puffing Billy and locomotives for the Stockton & Darlington Railway, Participant in the Rainhill trials
- William Hedley, designer of the Puffing Billy
- Charles Lartigue, Lartigue Monorail
- Joseph Locke, next to the Stephensons and Brunel, one of the most important English railway pioneers
- Thomas Newcomen, first practical static steam engine
- Benjamin Outram, civil engineer, surveyor and industrialist. Pioneer in the building of canals and tramways.
- John Ramsbottom, mechanical engineer who invented inter alia the Ramsbottom safety valve, the displacement lubricator, and the water trough
- Sir Vincent Litchfield Raven KBE, was CME of the North Eastern Railway from 1910 to 1922
- George Stephenson, first economically usable steam locomotive
- Robert Stephenson, son of George, winner of the Rainhill trials
- William Stroudley, one of Britain's most famous steam locomotive engineers of the 19th century, working principally for London, Brighton & South Coast Railway. Designed some of the most famous and longest lived steam locomotives of his era
- Patrick Stirling, CME of the Great Northern Railway where his famous 8 ft singles (4-2-2's) were the principal express engines for many years, achieving world-wide fame
- Richard Trevithick, "father of the locomotive", built first practical steam locomotive at Penydarran in Wales in 1804
- Charles Blacker Vignoles, inventor of the Vignoles rail profile
- James Watt, improvements to the steam engine
- Francis Webb, CME of the London & North Western Railway, a pioneer in the use of steel for locomotives
- William Wilson, first locomotive driver in Germany

=== United States ===
- Horatio Allen, designed world's first articulated locomotive in 1832
- Matthias William Baldwin, Baldwin Locomotive Works, the world's largest steam locomotive manufacturer
- Peter Cooper, first locomotive built in the US
- Charles F. Kettering, developed high-speed, 2-stroke diesel engines especially for rail traction
- William K. MacCurdy, developed the Hydra-Cushion in 1954 to ease stress on freight cars for Southern Pacific
- Sylvester Marsh, first mountain railway in the world with a rack system
- William Norris, founded the Norris Locomotive Works and pioneered the use of the 4-2-0 (Norris type) locomotive in America during the 1840s
- George Mortimer Pullman, Pullman Palace Car Company
- William Robinson, inventor of the track circuit
- Thomas Rogers, mechanical engineer and founder of Rogers Locomotive and Machine Works of Paterson, New Jersey
- Ephraim Shay, inventor of the Shay locomotive
- Frank Julian Sprague, "Father of electric traction" in the US, tramway, train safety system
- Robert L. Stevens, inventor of the Flanged T rail
- George S. Strong, introduced new locomotives types in American much in advance of their time
- Samuel M. Vauclain, Baldwin Locomotive Works, patented the Vauclain compound engine.
- Axel Vogt, mechanical engineer of the Pennsylvania Railroad 1887–1919, responsible for many of the beautifully proportioned and elegantly designed Pennsylvania classes, considerable influence on modern U.S. locomotive design
- George Westinghouse, designed the first through compressed air brake in trains
- Ross Winans, prolific inventor and builder of early American locomotives

=== Other countries ===
- Alfred Belpaire, Belgium, CME and Administrative President of Belgian State Railway. Inventor of Belpaire firebox
- Gaston du Bousquet, France, CME (ingénieur en chef traction) of the Chemin de Fer du Nord
- Dobrivoje Božić, Serbia, mechanical engineer, inventor and constructor of the first air brakes for trains
- Arturo Caprotti, Italy, invented rotating cam valve gear for locomotives, the Caprotti valve gear
- André Chapelon, France, built the most powerful steam locomotives in Europe
- Nicholas Cugnot, France, steam coach
- Alfred de Glehn, France, first compound locomotive with 4 cylinders in 1894
- Attilio Franco and Piero Crosti, Italy, invented the Franco-Crosti boiler
- Abraham Ganz, Austria-Hungary, founder of the Hungarian Ganz & Cie, railway wheels, coach building and electrical railway vehicles
- Jean Jacques Meyer, French locomotive designer, inventor of the articulated Meyer locomotive
- Carl Abraham Pihl, Norway, developer of the CAP Spur alias Kapspur
- Marc Seguin, France, first French locomotive engineer; independent inventor of the fire-tube boiler and blast pipe
- Hideo Shima, Japanese engineer and overseer of the first Shinkansen line.
- Egide Walschaerts, Belgium, engineer and inventor of the Walschaerts valve gear (also called the Heusinger valve gear)

== Infrastructure and politics ==
=== Austria ===
- Carl Ritter von Ghega, Semmering railway
- Baron Albert von Rothschild

=== Germany ===
- Philipp-August von Amsberg, first German state railway
- Herrmann Bachstein, initiated with his Centralverwaltung for Secundairbahnen a large number of branch lines
- Johann Adam Beil, manager of the Taunus railway from 1840 to 1852
- Otto von Bismarck, networking of competing private railways by nationalisation and political pressure, political concept behind the Deutsche Reichsbahn
- Julius Dorpmüller, general manager of the Deutsche Reichsbahn 1926–1945 and Reich Transport Minister from 1937 to 1945, planning of railway construction.
- Paul Camille von Denis, Bavarian Ludwigsbahn from Nuremberg-Fürth
- Karl Etzel, architect and railway pioneer (built, inter alia, the Brennerbahn, the Geislinger Steige and the Bietigheim railway viaduct
- Robert Gerwig, Schwarzwaldbahn, Gotthardbahn
- David Hansemann banker, politician, vice president of the Rhenisch railway company
- Friedrich Harkort, Prinz-Wilhelm railway
- August von der Heydt, head of the Prussian state railways from 1848 to 1869
- Michael Knoll, Geislinger Steige
- Claus Koepcke, engineer and responsible for the development of the Saxon narrow gauge railways as the Geheimer Finanzrat from 1872
- Gustav Kröhnke, engineer, pushed for the construction of the Vogelfluglinie
- Friedrich List, German economist
- Albert von Maybach, head of the Prussian state railways from 1879
- Helmuth Karl Bernhard Graf von Moltke, field marshal, strategist
- Louis Victor Robert Schwartzkopff, German businessman, founded L Schwartzkopff, later Berliner Maschinenbau
- Bethel Henry Strousberg, numerous routes in former Prussia and central Europe

=== Switzerland ===
- Alfred Escher, Swiss railway law, Swiss Northeastern Railway, Gotthardbahn
- Adolf Guyer-Zeller, Jungfraubahn
- Alois Negrelli von Moldelbe, first Swiss railway from Baden to Zürich
- Willem Jan Holsboer, initiator of the Rhaetian Railway

=== United Kingdom ===
- Thomas Brassey, railway entrepreneur, built railways on every continent
- Isambard Kingdom Brunel, numerous British railway lines, broad gauge
- Edward Pease, initiator and operator of the Stockton and Darlington Railway, co-founder of the railway town of Middlesbrough
- Sir Samuel Morton Peto, English railway entrepreneur (1809–1889)

=== United States ===
- John W. Barriger III, railway entrepreneur
- Henry Morrison Flagler, Florida East Coast Railway
- Jay Gould, railway tycoon
- E. H. Harriman, railway tycoon
- James J. Hill, railway tycoon
- David Moffat, railway entrepreneur
- William Jackson Palmer, railway entrepreneur
- van Sweringen brothers, railway entrepreneurs
- Cornelius Vanderbilt, railway tycoon, patented Vanderbilt boilers and tenders
- Daniel Willard, railway manager

=== Other countries ===
- Louis Armand, France, president of SNCF board of directors, president of UIC and inventor of water treatment process for steam locomotives
- Cecil Rhodes, railway construction in Africa
- William Cornelius Van Horne, responsible for the completion of the transcontinental route of the Canadian Pacific Railway
- Søren Hjorth, initiator of the first Scandinavian railway line from Copenhagen to Roskilde

== See also ==
- History of rail transport
