= Gölsdorf =

Gölsdorf may refer to:

- Louis Adolf Gölsdorf (1837–1911), Austrian engineer and locomotive designer, father of Karl
- Karl Gölsdorf (1861–1916), Austrian engineer and locomotive designer, son of Louis Adolf
- Gölsdorf axle, system used on railway locomotives invented by Karl Gölsdorf
