= Train buffer =

Train buffer may refer to:

- Buffer (rail transport)
- Buffer stop
