= Adolph Giesl-Gieslingen =

Austrian locomotive designer and engineer

Adolph Giesl-Gieslingen (7 September 1903 – 11 February 1992) was an Austrian locomotive designer and engineer.

Giesl-Gieslingen was born in 1903 in Trient, Tirol, and studied at the Technical College in Vienna. In 1924 he published a technical article on smokebox design and chimneys. In 1925 he received his diploma as an engineer, and began working as a design engineer at the Floridsdorf locomotive works, where he was involved in the construction of the Class 214 2-8-4s. While at Floridorf he continued his studies, being interested in developing the rectangular chimney design developed by Golsdorf in Austria, and finished his doctoral thesis on locomotive front-end design in 1929.

== To the United States ==
In 1929 the director, Arno Demmer, sent him to the United States, where he stayed until 1938, working on the New York Central Railroad testing a Kylala blastpipe. There he got to know his wife, whom he married in 1933 in New York.

== Return to Austria ==
After his return he became Demmer's assistant and, after the Second World War, chief engineer of the Floridsdorf company. In 1946 he took up his post as honorary professor at the Technical College in Vienna as the successor to Johann Rihosek.

== Giesl ejector ==
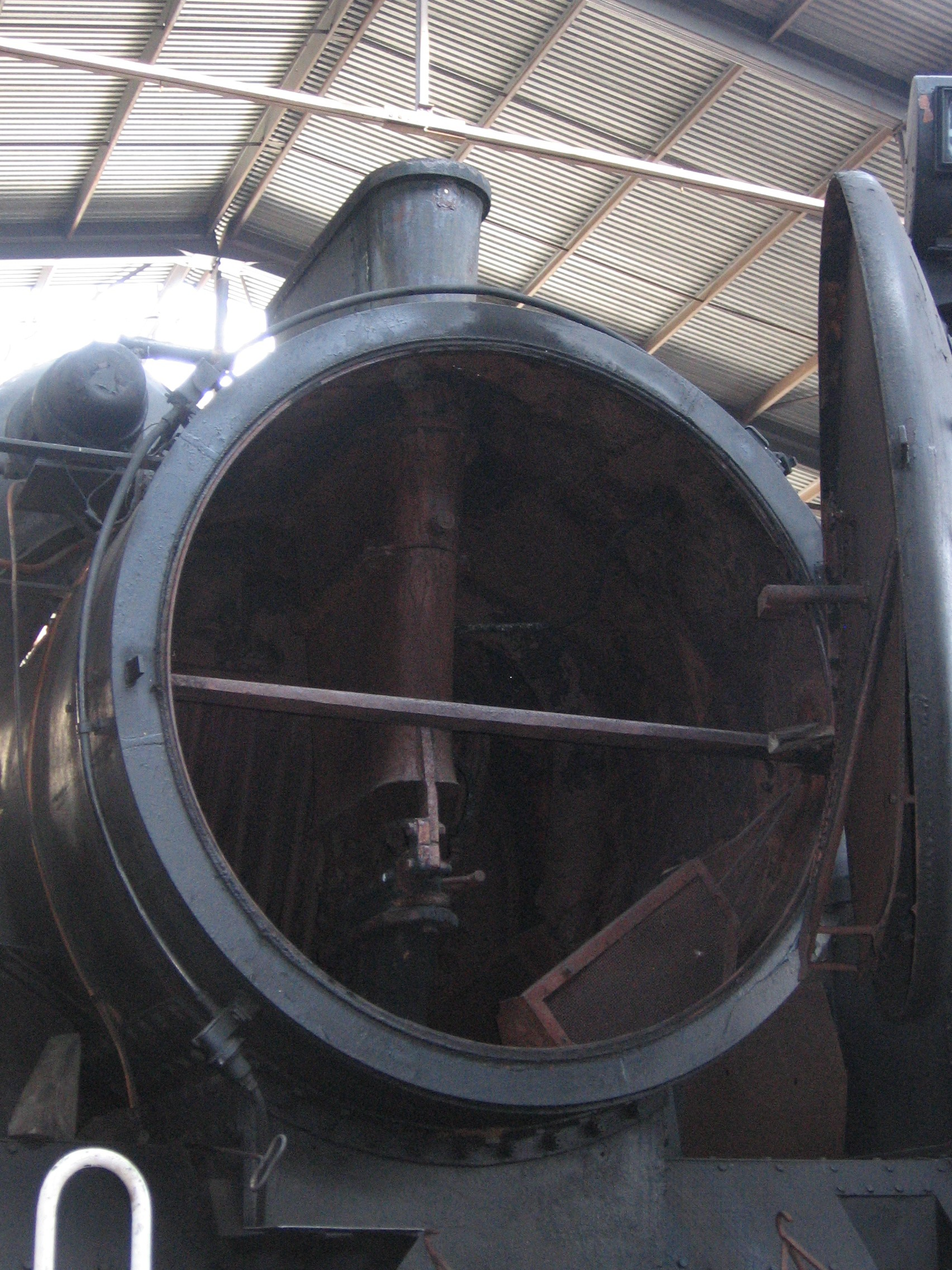
Smokebox with Giesl-ejector on the ČSD 534.0432 in museum Lužná u Rakovníka, Czech Republic

He developed the Giesl ejector for steam locomotives, which he patented and allowed to be sold by the Schoeller-Bleckmann works. The first notable application of this was to an Austrian 2-8-4 where fitting of the Giesl ejector produced a 25% increase in power output and a small saving in coal. As a result, Giesl ejectors were fitted to locomotives in Austria, East Germany, East Africa and Czechoslovakia. British Railways 9F locomotive No. 92250 was tested at Rugby with a Giesl ejector which demonstrated its effectiveness but due to imminent dieselisation no other locomotives were so fitted. Giesl later published several books on the subject of steam locomotive technology through the Viennese publishers of Verlag Slezak. The effectiveness of the Giesl ejector, being slightly better than the Kylchap exhaust, has led to two preserved locomotives in the UK being fitted with it; Bulleid Pacific No. 34092 City of Wells and BR standard class 2 2-6-0 No. 78022.

== Death ==
Adolph Giesl-Gieslingen died on 11 February 1992 in Vienna.

== Sources ==
- Ernst Kabelka, In memoriam Professor Giesl-Gieslingen, in Schienenverkehr aktuell, 4/1992, S. 8.
- Ingrid Trummer, Alexander Stollhof (Hrsg), "...Bei uns in der Lofag...", Erinnerungen an die Floridsdorfer Lokomotivfabrik - Wiens größter Industriebetrieb, Edition Volkshochschule, Wien 2005, ISBN 3-900799-67-9

== Literature ==
- Lokomotiv-Athleten. Geschichte, Leistung und Kurvenlauf der Sechs- und Siebenkuppler, Verlag Slezak, Wien 1976, ISBN 3-900134-27-8
- Die Ära nach Gölsdorf. Die letzten 3 Jahrzehnte des österreichischen Dampflokomotivbaus, Verlag Slezak, Wien 1981, ISBN 3-900134-37-5
- Anatomie der Dampflokomotive International, Verlag Slezak, Wien 1986, ISBN 3-85416-089-5
