= Anatole Mallet =

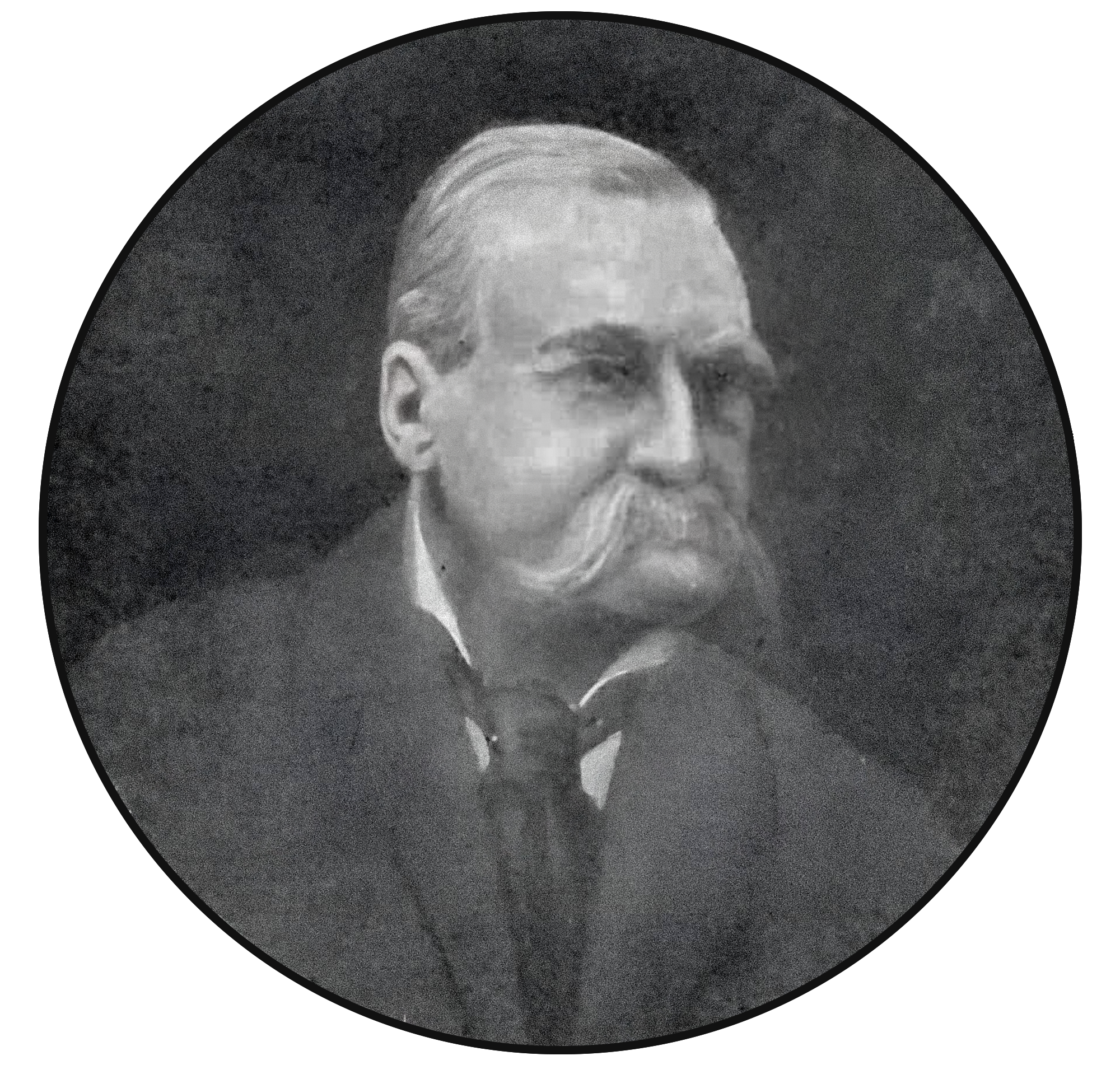
Anatole Mallet.

Jules Theodore Anatole Mallet (23 May 1837 – 10 October 1919) was a Swiss mechanical engineer, who was the inventor of the first successful compound system for a railway steam locomotive, patented in 1874. He is known for having invented three important forms of compound locomotive.

In 1876 he introduced a series of small two-cylinder compound 0-4-2T tank locomotives for the Bayonne-Anglet-Biarritz Railway in France.

He subsequently designed an articulated compound system with a rigid chassis at the rear carrying two high-pressure cylinders, and two low-pressure ones mounted on a swivelling front truck. This was patented in 1884 with full rights granted in 1885. This was first used for a series of 600 mm (1 ft 11 5/8 in) narrow gauge locomotives specially built by the Decauville Company in 1888 for the Paris Exposition of 1889. This arrangement became known as the Mallet locomotive. The final developments of these in the USA were some of the largest steam locomotives ever built.

A third compound locomotive, less well-known, was a tandem compound developed in 1890 for SACM as a collaboration with Alfred de Glehn and the Russian A. Borodine. The high and low pressure cylinders were mounted on a common axis, with the high pressure ahead. Unlike the US tandem compounds, the high and low pressure cylinders were cross-connected between sides, which also required them to be receiver compounds with an intermediate reservoir as a pair of curved pipes passing through the smokebox. Large numbers of these, mostly a 2-8-0 derivative, were built for Russian and Hungarian railways making them the most-produced type of tandem compound locomotive. Z. Kordina's design for Hungarian State Railways was a similar 4-4-0, although outside-framed and with the low-pressure cylinders ahead of the high pressure.

He was awarded the Elliott Cresson Medal of The Franklin Institute in 1908, and he was elected an honorary member of the American Society of Mechanical Engineers in 1912.

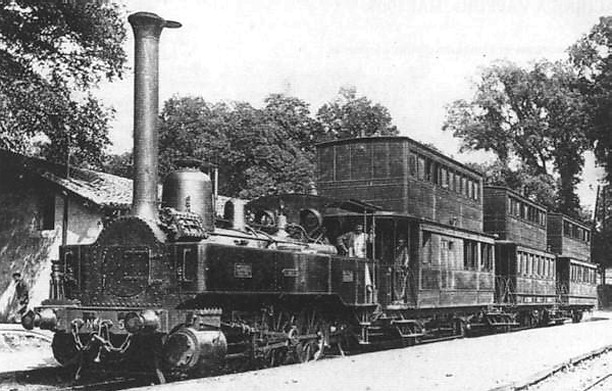
Early Mallet 2-cylinder compound locomotive working the Bayonne-Anglet-Biarritz (B.A.B.) Railway

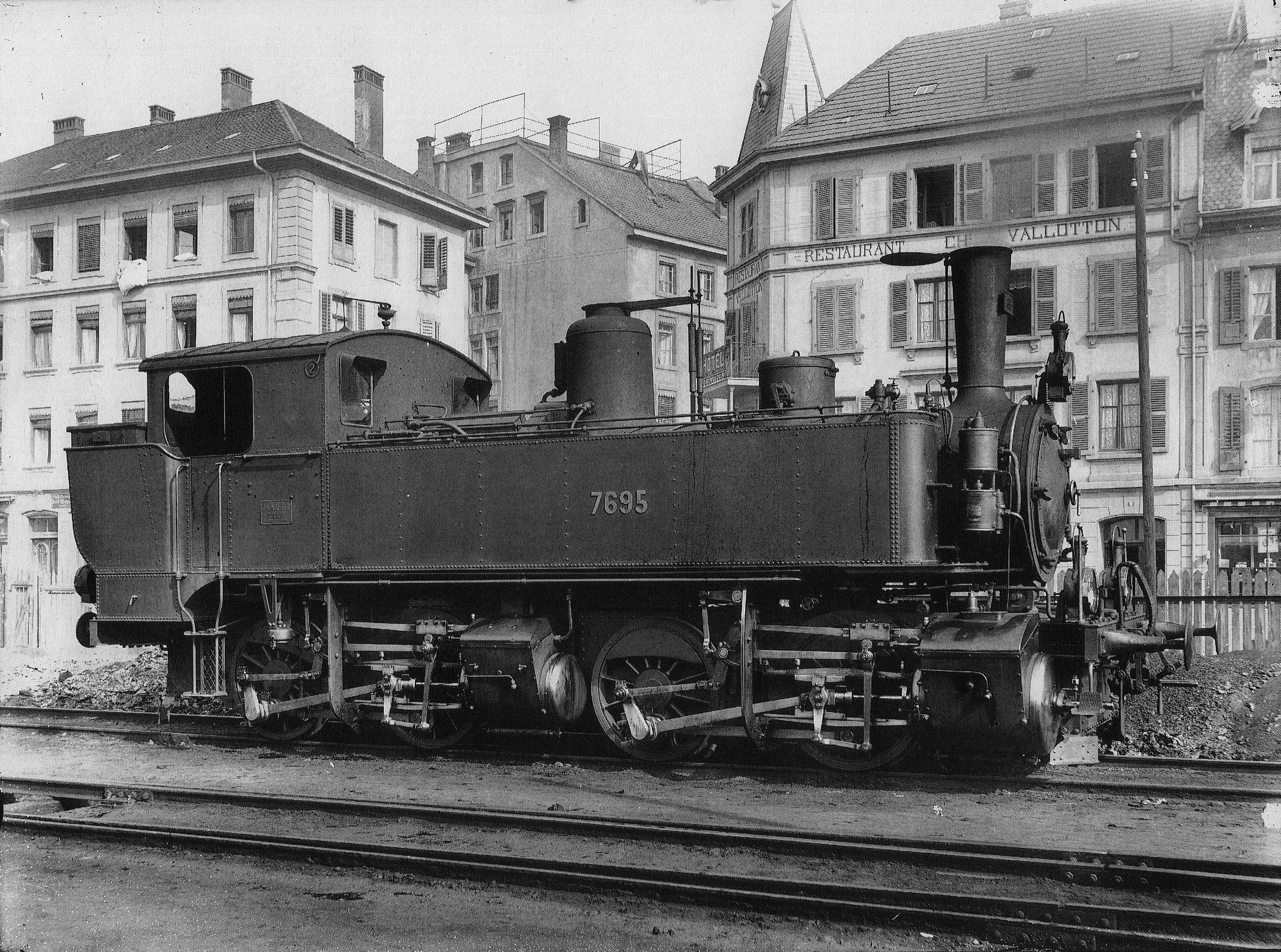
SCB Ed 2x2/2, a typical normal-gauge compound Mallet tank. Note the larger diameter of the low-pressure front cylinders.

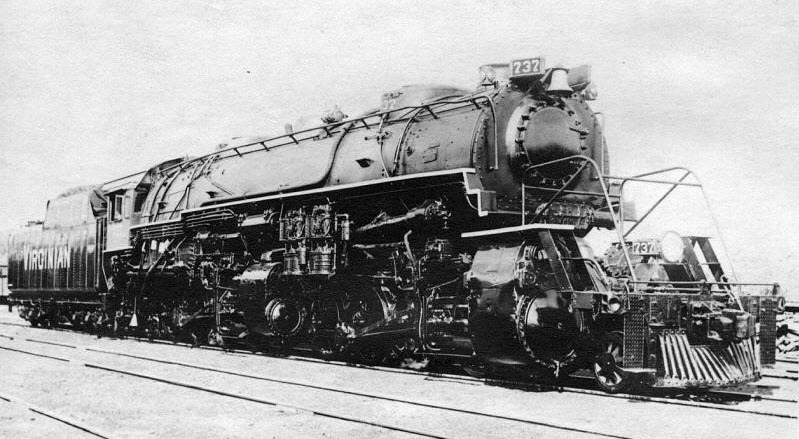
One of the last US large compound Mallets

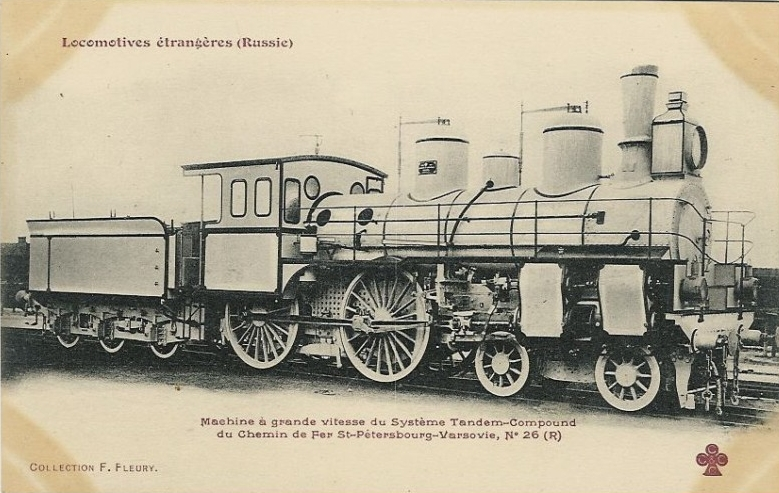
Mallet tandem compound, Russian locomotives class П

== See also ==
- List of railway pioneers
