= Franz Xaver Riepl =

Austrian railway pioneer (1790–1857)

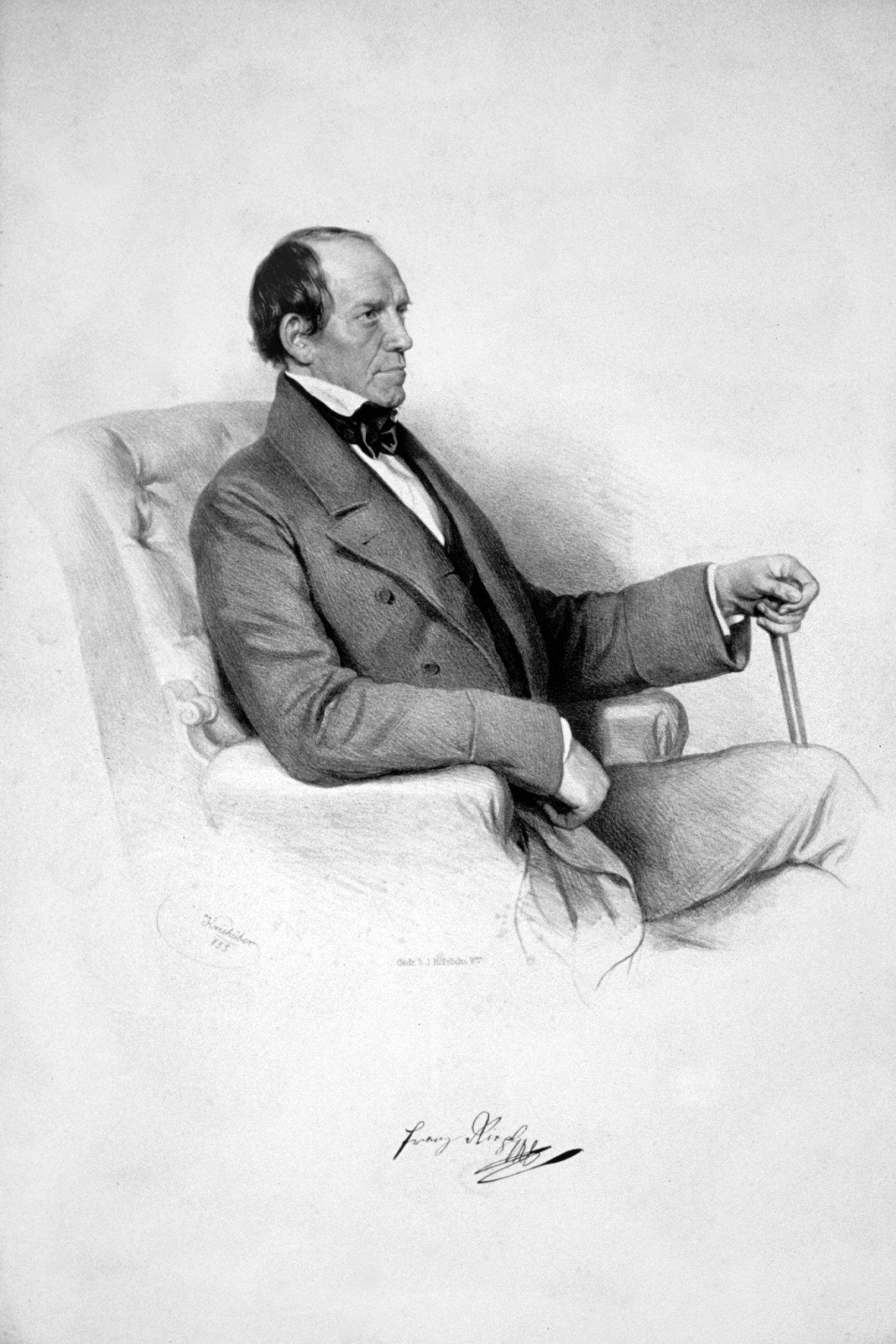
Franz Xaver Riepl, lithograph by Josef Kriehuber (1855)

Franz Xaver Riepl (29 November 1790 – 25 April 1857) was an Austrian geologist, railway pioneer and metallurgical specialist.

== Life ==
Riepl was born in Graz, Styria where his father worked as a building inspector. He attended the mining college in Schemnitz (present-day Banská Štiavnica, Slovakia) and, back in Graz, worked with the famous geologist Friedrich Mohs (1773–1839) at the Joanneum technical college. From 1816 he was employed at the Fürstenberg iron mines in Nižbor (Nischburg), Bohemia and undertook extended study tours through Saxony, Bavaria, Prussian Silesia, and Moravia.

Between 1819 and 1835 he worked as a professor at the Imperial and Royal Polytechnic Institute in Vienna. During the 1820s, Riepl again made study trips through the Inner Austrian and Illyrian provinces of the Austrian monarchy; it was from him that the initiative came to quarry the Styrian Erzberg using open cast mining. He also assisted the Austrian State Chancellor Prince Klemens von Metternich establishing iron works on his estates in Plasy, Bohemia. With the support of the Olomouc Cardinal Archduke Rudolf of Austria, he also worked as a surveyor at the Friedland (Frýdlant) mines in Moravia. In 1829 he gave the impulse for building the important Witkowitz iron works nearby, where he introduced the English puddling process.

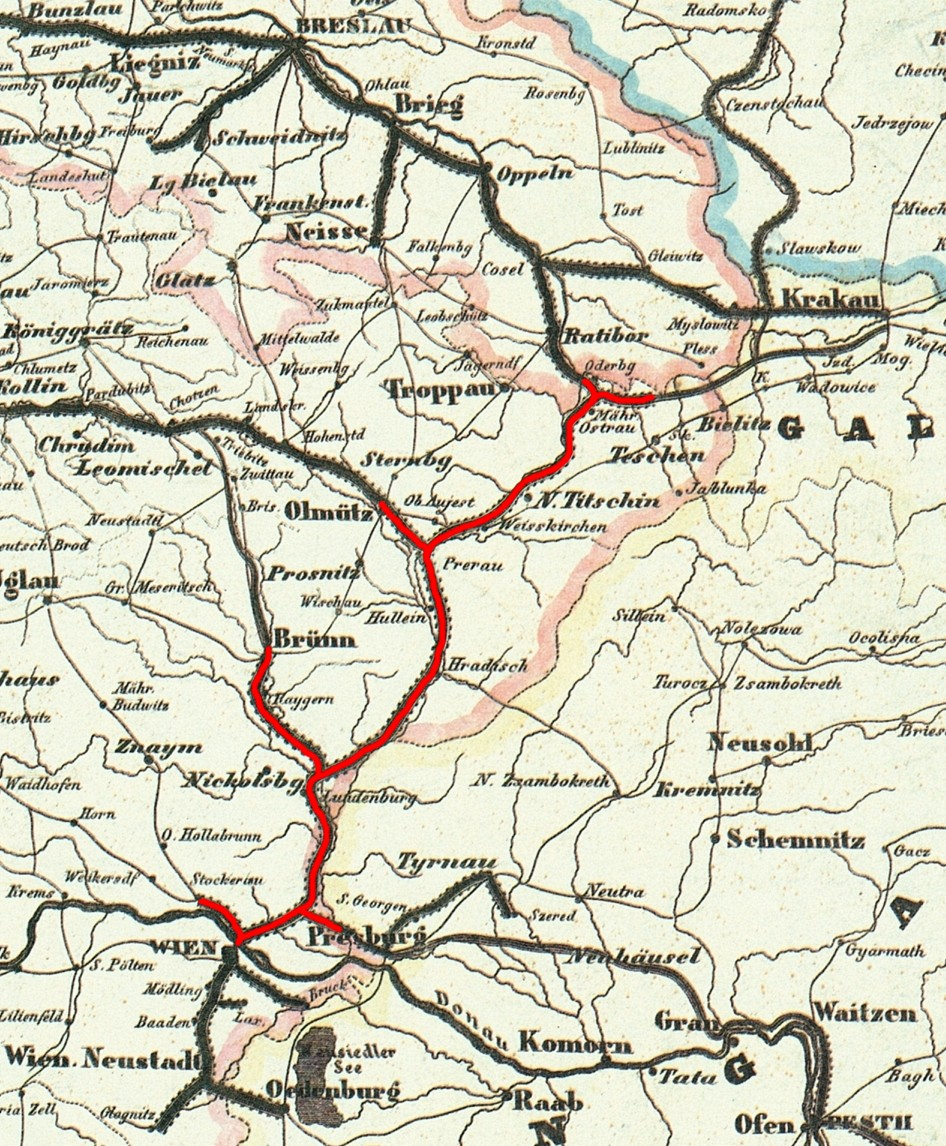
Nordbahn railway lines (red) in 1849

As early as 1828 Riepl had developed plans for a railway network across the whole Austrian Empire, including the later Southern Railway as well as a railway link from the Kingdom of Galicia via Vienna to the Port of Trieste. In 1830 he presented detailed route diagrams of a railway line running from Vienna to the Witkowitz iron works and further eastwards to the Wieliczka Salt Mine near Kraków. In the following years, he travelled to England several times to study the construction of railway lines. Receiving large funds by Salomon Mayer von Rothschild, his plans were finalised: backed by Chancellor Metternich and the Bohemian "stadtholder" Franz Anton von Kolowrat-Liebsteinsky, Riepl and Rothschild received the commission for the building of the Emperor Ferdinand Northern Railway line (Nordbahn) from Vienna to Bochnia. Construction began in 1937, the line up to Bohumín (Oderberg) in Austrian Silesia was completed in 1847. One year later, a connection to the Prussian Upper Silesian Railway; a transport link to Kraków was provided by the Eastern National Railway from 1856.

Riepl died in Vienna, aged 66. He was buried in the Hinterbrühl cemetery in Lower Austria. In 1904, the street of Rieplstrasse in Vienna's Favoriten district was named after him.

== See also ==
- List of railway pioneers
