= John Haswell =

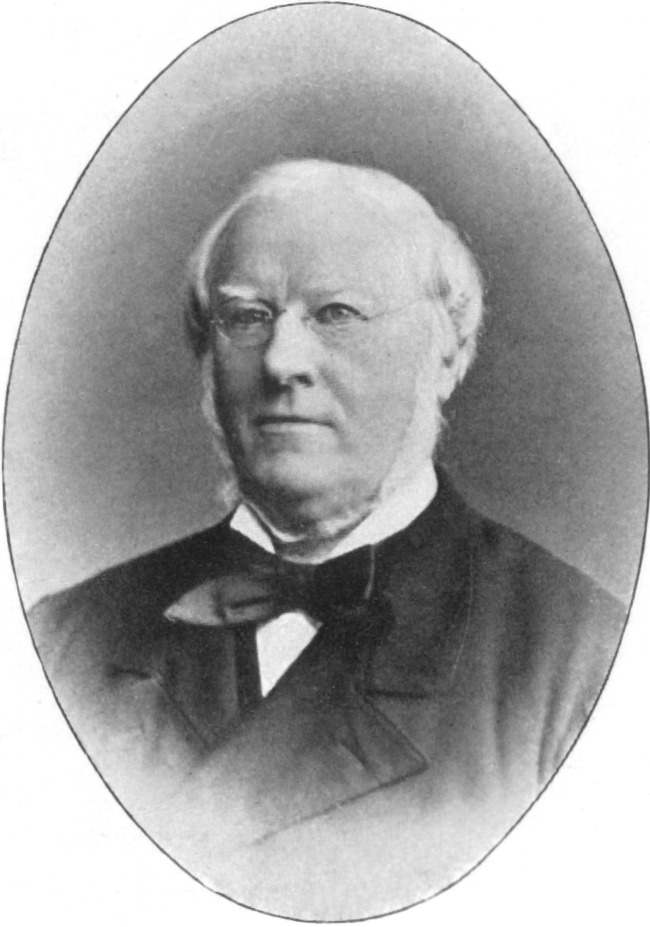
John Haswell

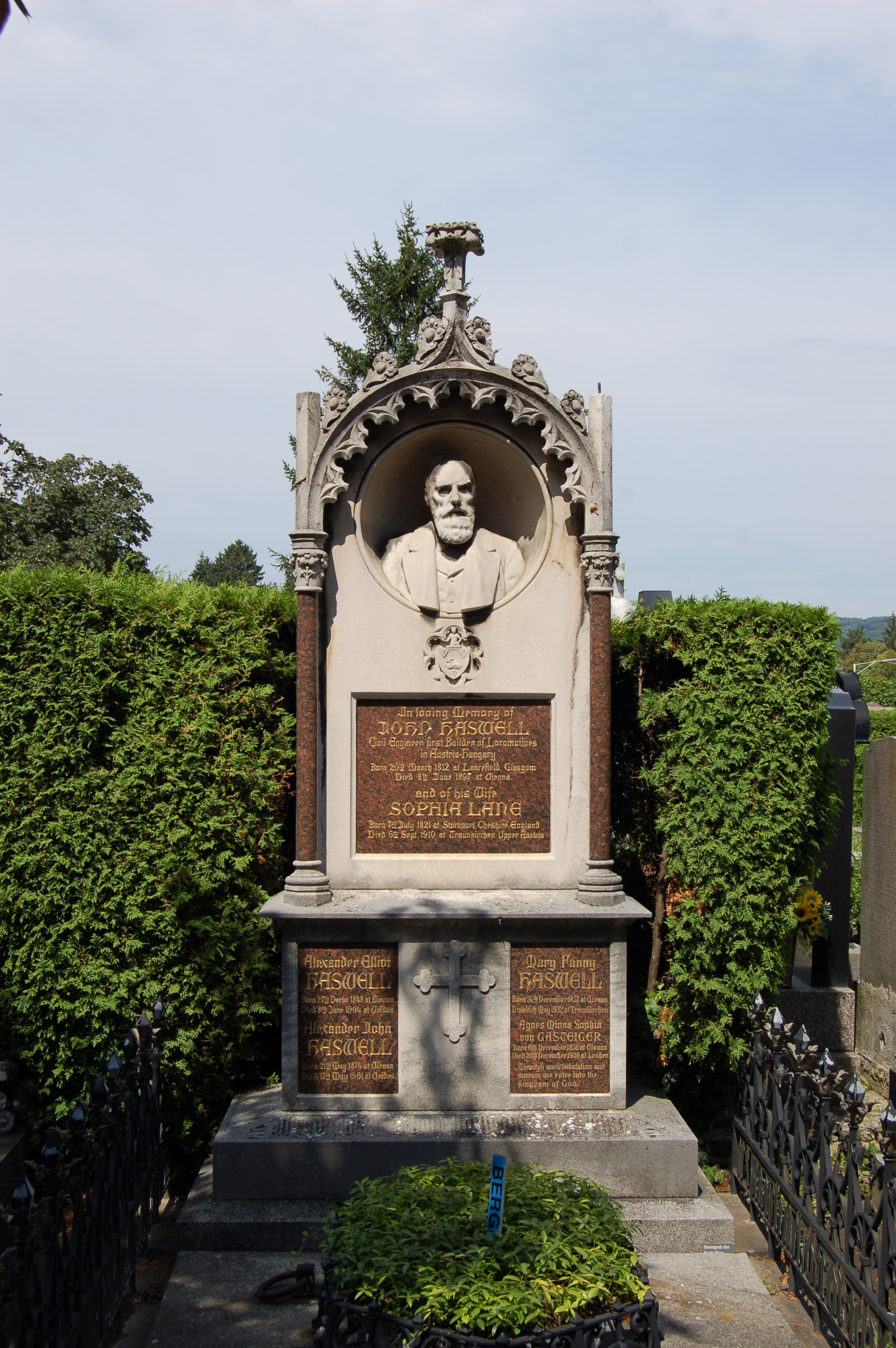
Haswell's grave (Döbling Cemetery)

John Haswell (20 March 1812 – 8 June 1897) was a Scottish engineer and locomotive designer.

== Biography ==
Haswell was born on 20 March 1812 in Lancefield, Glasgow, Scotland, studied at Anderson's University in Glasgow and worked for 22 years in the shipbuilding office of William Fairbairn & Co.

In 1837 at the prompting of Matthias Schönerer, who was also heavily involved in the Budweis–Linz–Gmunden Horse-Drawn Railway, he drew up plans for the repair shop of the Wien-Raaber railway (later Lokomotivfabrik der StEG), and in 1839 became entrusted with carrying them out, along with the mechanical engineer Kraft. When the workshop had been built, the first of its kind in Austria, he took over its management and oversaw, not just repair work, but also the construction of new rolling stock for the railway.

Inter alia he was responsible for:

- the first six-coupled steam locomotive in Austria FAHRAFELD (1846)
- participating in the Semmering competition in 1851 with the locomotive VINDOBONA, a model for the subsequent Engerth mountain locomotives
- the first eight-coupled, steam locomotive in Austria WIEN–RAAB (1855), the pattern for heavy freight locomotives on the continent for many years
- the steam brake first used on the STEYERDORF (1861)
- the first four-cylinder locomotive, the DUPLEX (1861)
- the hydraulic forging press (1862), that first enabled the forging of heavy machine components in dies (today at the Vienna Museum of Technology)
- Corrugated iron firebox (1872)

In 1882 Haswell resigned from his position. He died on 8 June 1897 in Vienna and rests in a grave dedicated to his honour at the Döbling Cemetery (Group 10, number 1) in Vienna.

== See also ==
- List of railway pioneers

== Sources ==
- Karl Gölsdorf: Lokomotivbau in Alt-Österreich 1837–1918. Verlag Slezak, Vienna 1978, ISBN 3-900134-40-5.
