= Friedrich Wilhelm Eckhardt =

German engineer

- Born: 25 February 1892 Kassel, Germany
- Died: 9 April 1961 (aged 69) Niederlehme, East Germany
- Allegiance: Germany
- Rank: Senior Engineer

Friedrich Wilhelm Eckhardt (25 February 1892 – 9 April 1961) was a German engineer and head of the design office for the Berliner Maschinenbau Aktien Gesellschaft vormals L. Schwartzkopff.

== Life and Career in Germany ==
Eckhardt was born on 25 February 1892 in Kassel, Germany and initially worked for Henschel & Sohn before switching to L. Schwartzkopff in 1916. In 1936 he became a senior railway locomotive engineer (Oberingenieur) of the German Reich Railway in Germany.

He played a decisive role in the German designs of the DRG Class 41 2-8-2’s and Class 84 2-10-2’s steam locomotives during the Nazi dictatorship. For the latter, he developed the Schwartzkopff-Eckhardt II bogie named after him, which was designed to improve the curve running of steam engines.

In addition he published several books on the construction and design of steam locomotives. He died on 9 April 1961 in Niederlehme in East Germany.

== Works ==
- Die Konstruktion der Dampflokomotive and ihre Berechnung, Verlag Technik 1952, Reprint: Transpress, Stuttgart 2008, ISBN 978-3-613-71348-2
- Lokomotivkunde. H. 5. Das Fahrgestell der Dampflokomotiven, Fachbuchverlag Leipzig, 1957
- Einführung in die Theorie der Dampflokomotive für Praktiker zum Selbstunterricht, Fachbuchverlag Leipzig, 1952
- Das Entwerfen von Dampflokomotiven, Siemens, 1948
- Das Fahrgestell der Dampflokomotiven, Transpress, Berlin 1960

== See also ==
- List of railway pioneers
