= Rudolf Sanzin =

Austrian engineer and locomotive designer

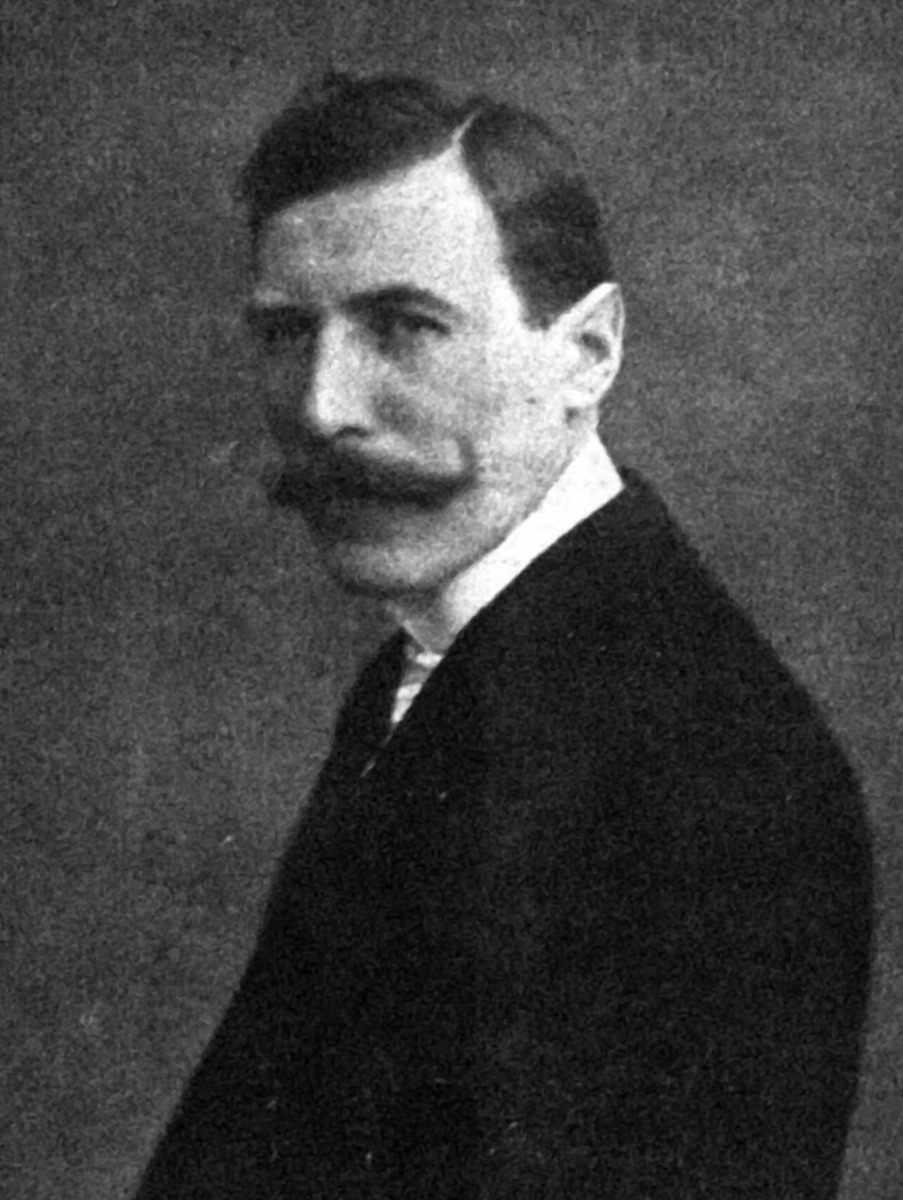
Rudolf Sanzin

Rudolf Sanzin (4 June 1874 – 2 June 1922) was an Austrian engineer and locomotive designer.

== Life ==
Rudolf Sanzin was born in Mürzzuschlag, in the province of Styria, Austria on 4 June 1874. His father was an official with the Austrian Southern Railway or Südbahn. After completing his A levels (Matura) he studied at the Graz University of Technology until 1900. The following year he was himself given a job with the Südbahn, but did his doctorate in 1904 at Graz (with a dissertation entitled Investigations into the performance of a locomotive and confirmation of the optimum loading of the same).

His subsequent publications caught the attention of the railway ministry, with the result that Karl Gölsdorf recruited him to the ministry, where he worked as a design engineer. Later on, he became the head of the department for the design of electric locomotives in the then Electrification Office.

He obtained post-doctoral qualifications at Graz in 1906 and at the Vienna University of Technology in 1909, where he was appointed as a reader in 1919.

In addition to his career work, he was also an avid artist and produced numerous drawings and water colours. This activity led however to his death: whilst on holiday in Trieste he died as a result of poisoning from one of his paints on 2 June 1922.

He rests in a grave in Vienna's central cemetery, no. 16B-9-25. In 1942 the Sanzingasse street in Vienna's Favoriten district was named in his honour.

== See also ==
- List of railway pioneers

== Sources ==
- HR Ing. Albrecht: Dr. Rudolf Sanzin †, In: Zeitschrift des österreichischen Ingenieur- und Architektenverein, 1922, ISSN 0372-9605
