= Anton Elbel =

Austrian engineer and locomotive designer

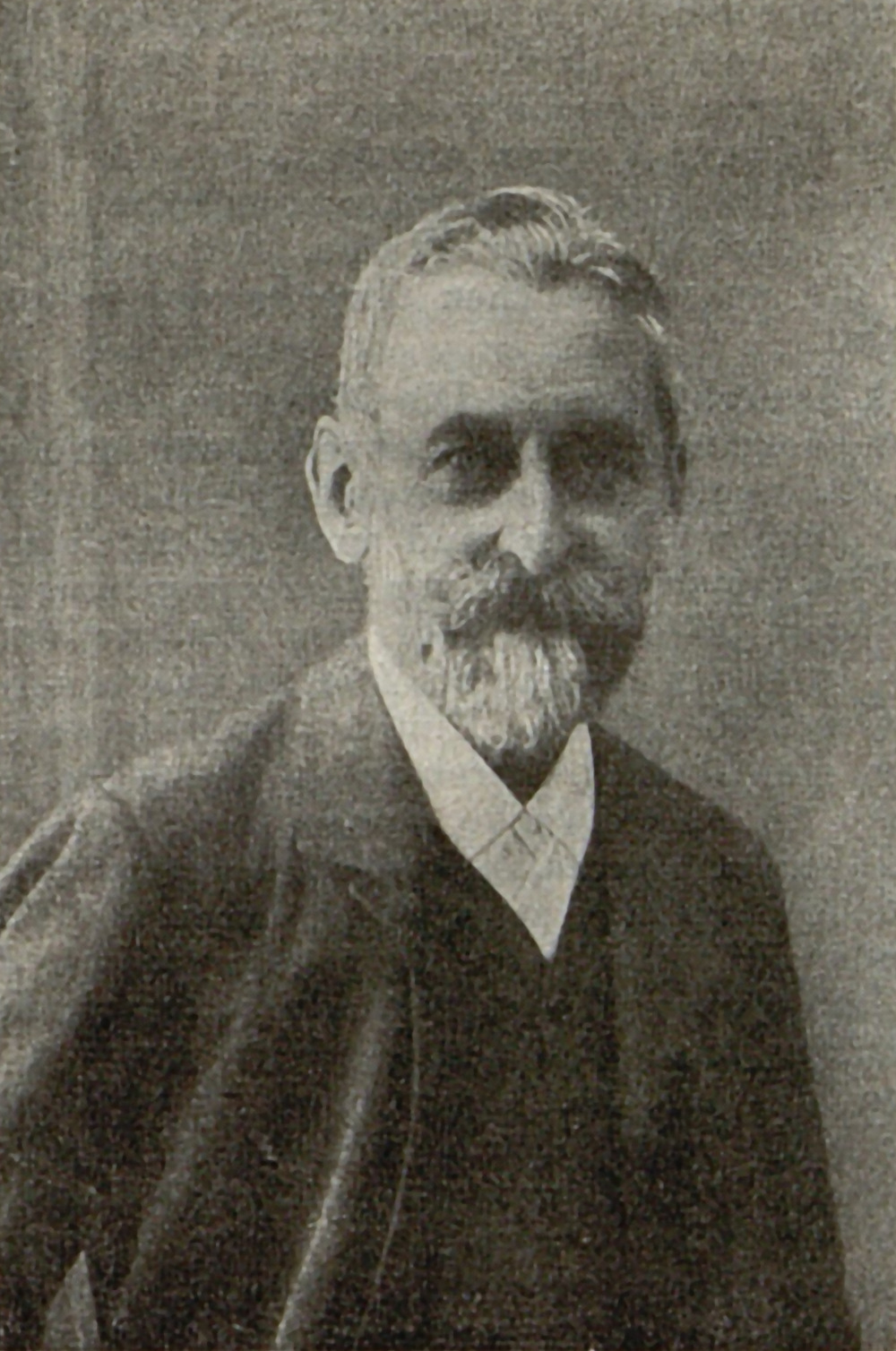
- Born: January 6, 1834; Vienna, Austria
- Died: October 3, 1912 (aged 78); Baden, Austria
- Education: Vienna University of Technology
- Known for: Building railways Designing the Gepäcklokomotive

Anton Elbel (6 January 1834 – 3 October 1912) was an Austrian engineer and locomotive designer.

== Biography ==
Anton Elbel was born in Vienna on 6 January 1834 and attended the Polytechnic Institute there. In 1856, he began working for the Carinthian Railway (Kärntner Bahn). When the company was absorbed by the Austrian Southern Railway, or Südbahn, he transferred with it and worked in the Südbahn design office in Vienna from 1860 to 1867.

He subsequently served for several years as inspector of general operations during the construction of the Hungarian Western Railway for several years. From 1872 to 1892, Elbel worked for the Austrian Northwest Railway, where he rose to the position of central inspector and head of the design office.

Together with Louis Adolf Gölsdorf, he designed the Gepäcklokomotive, an economical type of locomotive equipped with a luggage compartment that was used on several Austro-Hungarian railways.

Elbel died on 3 October 1912 in Baden, Lower Austria.

== See also ==
- List of railway pioneers
