= Volute spring =

Type of cone-shaped compression spring

A volute spring, also known as a conical spring, is a compression spring in the form of a cone (somewhat like the classical volute decorative architectural ornament). Under compression, the coils slide past each other, thus enabling the spring to be compressed to a very short length in comparison with what would be possible with a more conventional helical spring.

There are two typical types of volute spring:

- The first has a shape for the initial spring steel (or other material for the wound spring) as a "V", with one end wider than the other
- The second is the double volute, having two "V" shapes facing away from each other, which forms a distorted cylinder having a wider diameter at the centre than at the ends, forming symmetric attachment points

Double volute springs can frequently be found as a component of garden pruning shears. Short posts anchored in each side of the handles, and inserted into each narrow end of the spring, keep the spring in position.

However, the applications of volute springs are not limited to such light-duty purposes as gardening shears. For example, volute springs are used to cushion the impact between railway cars and as a core element of the suspension system of Sherman tanks. A volute spring buffer device for railway cars was invented by John Brown in 1848.

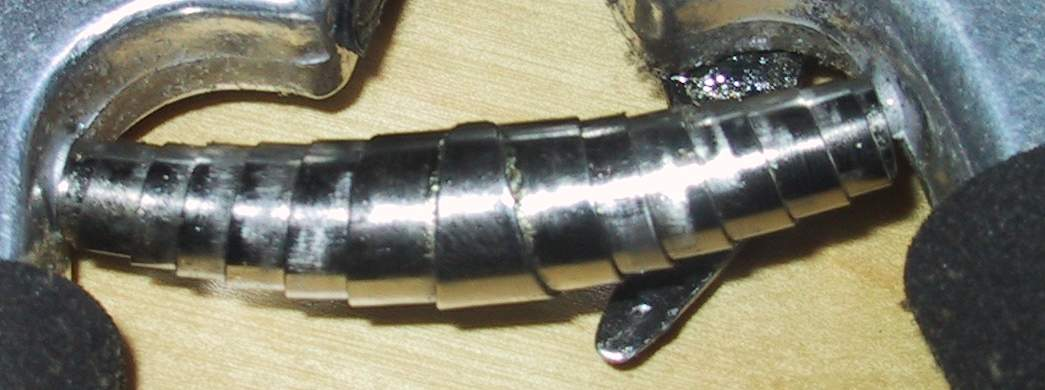
A double volute spring mounted in pruning shears. Under compression, the coils slide over each other, so affording longer travel.

A double volute spring

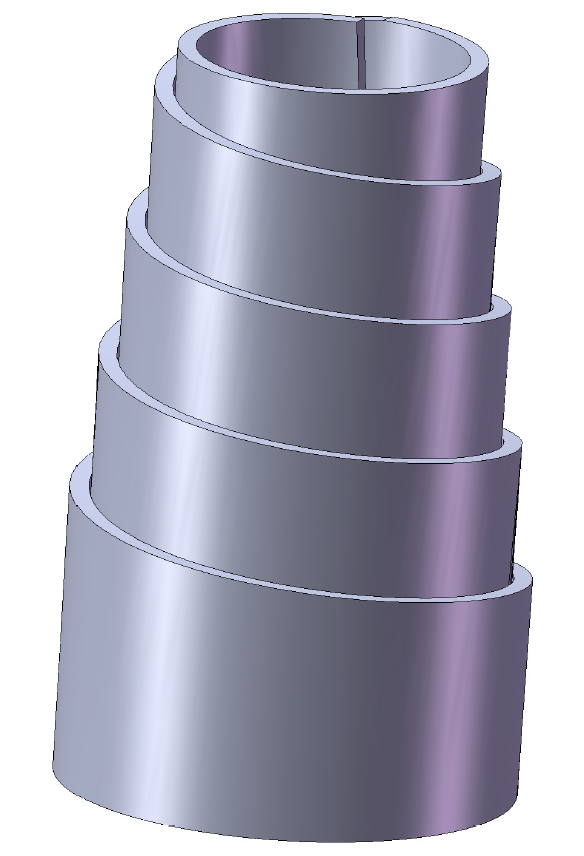
A single-sided conical, or volute spring

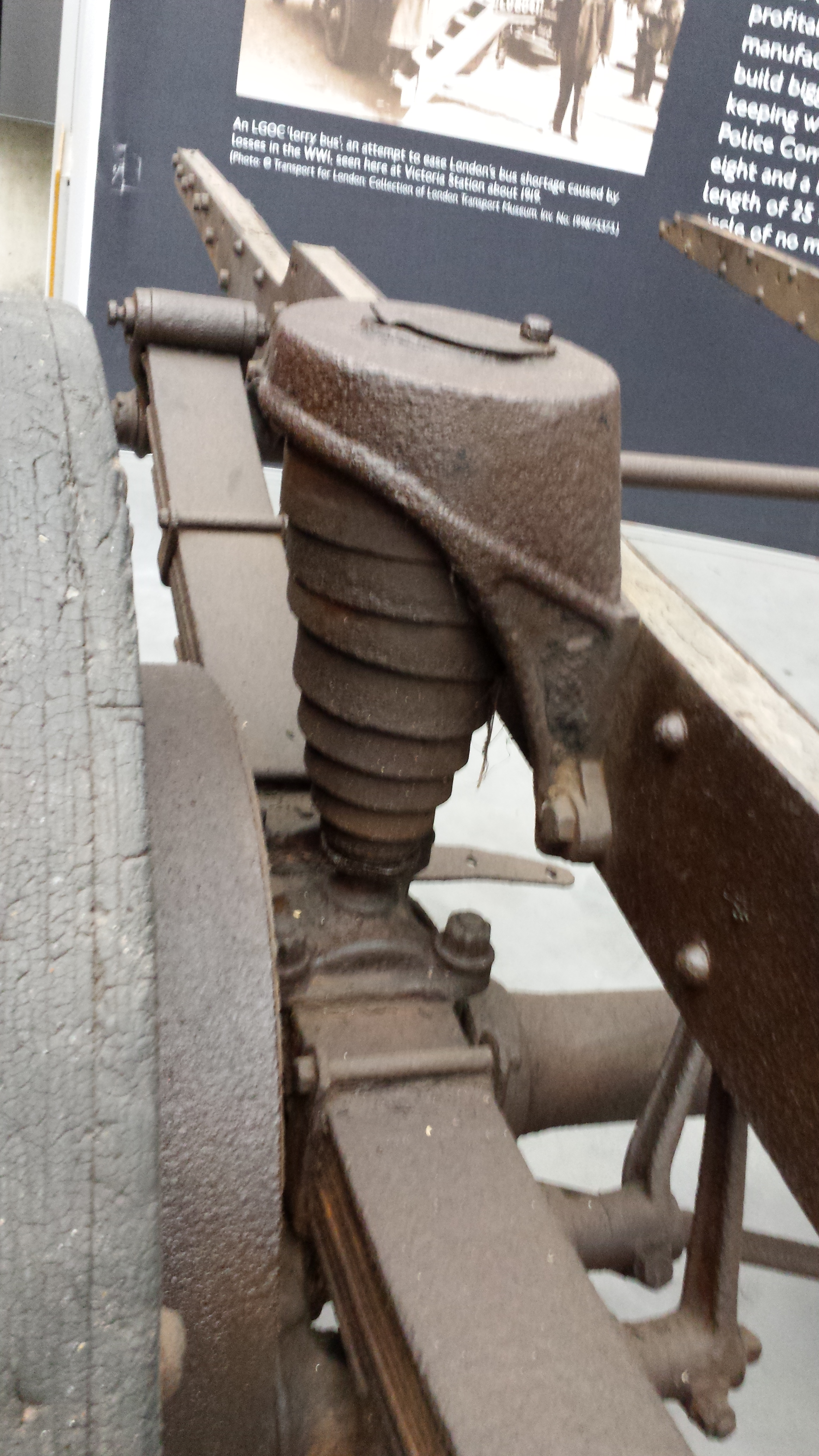
A volute suspension spring (1919)

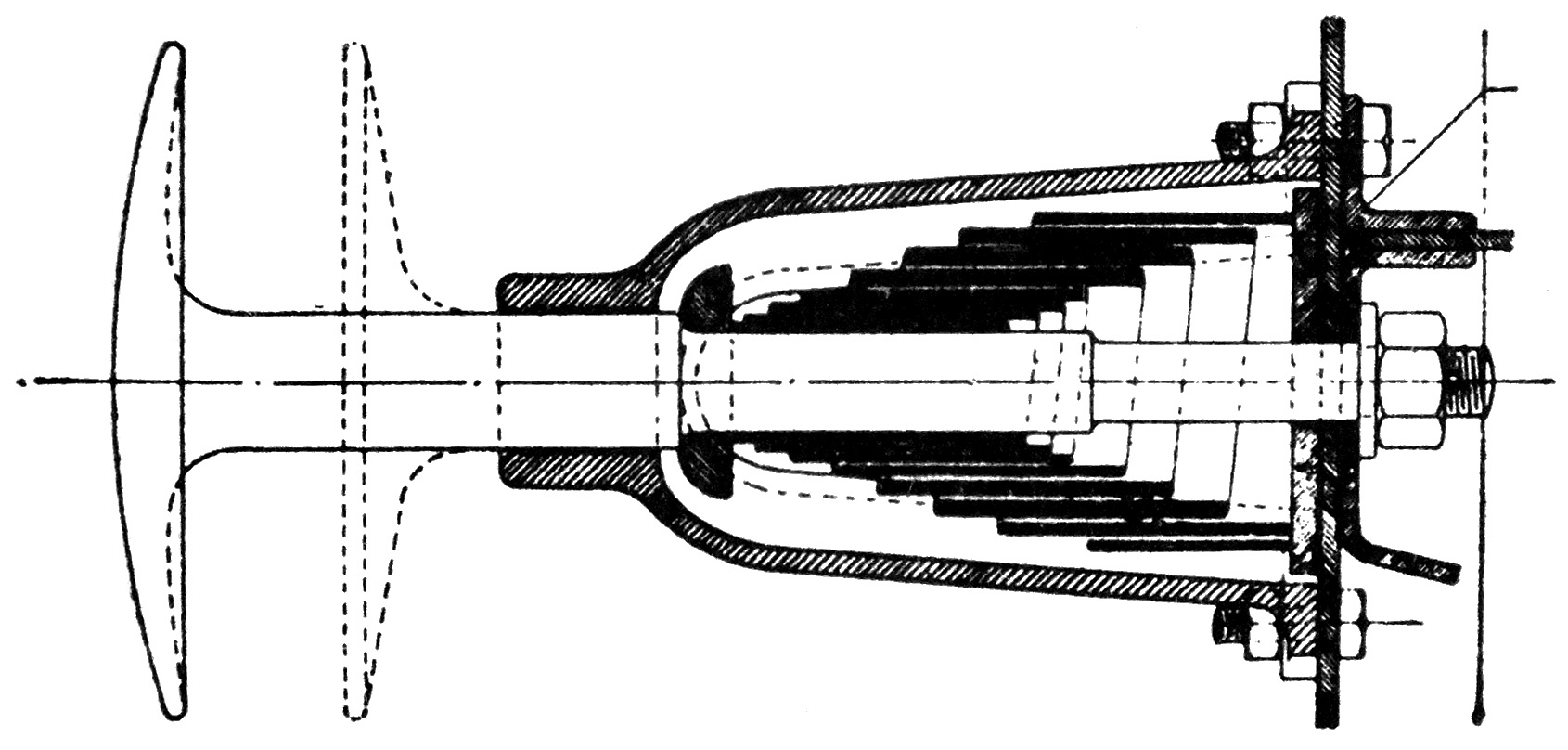
Diagram showing volute spring within the buffer assembly of a railway car (with dotted lines showing compressed position), invented 1848

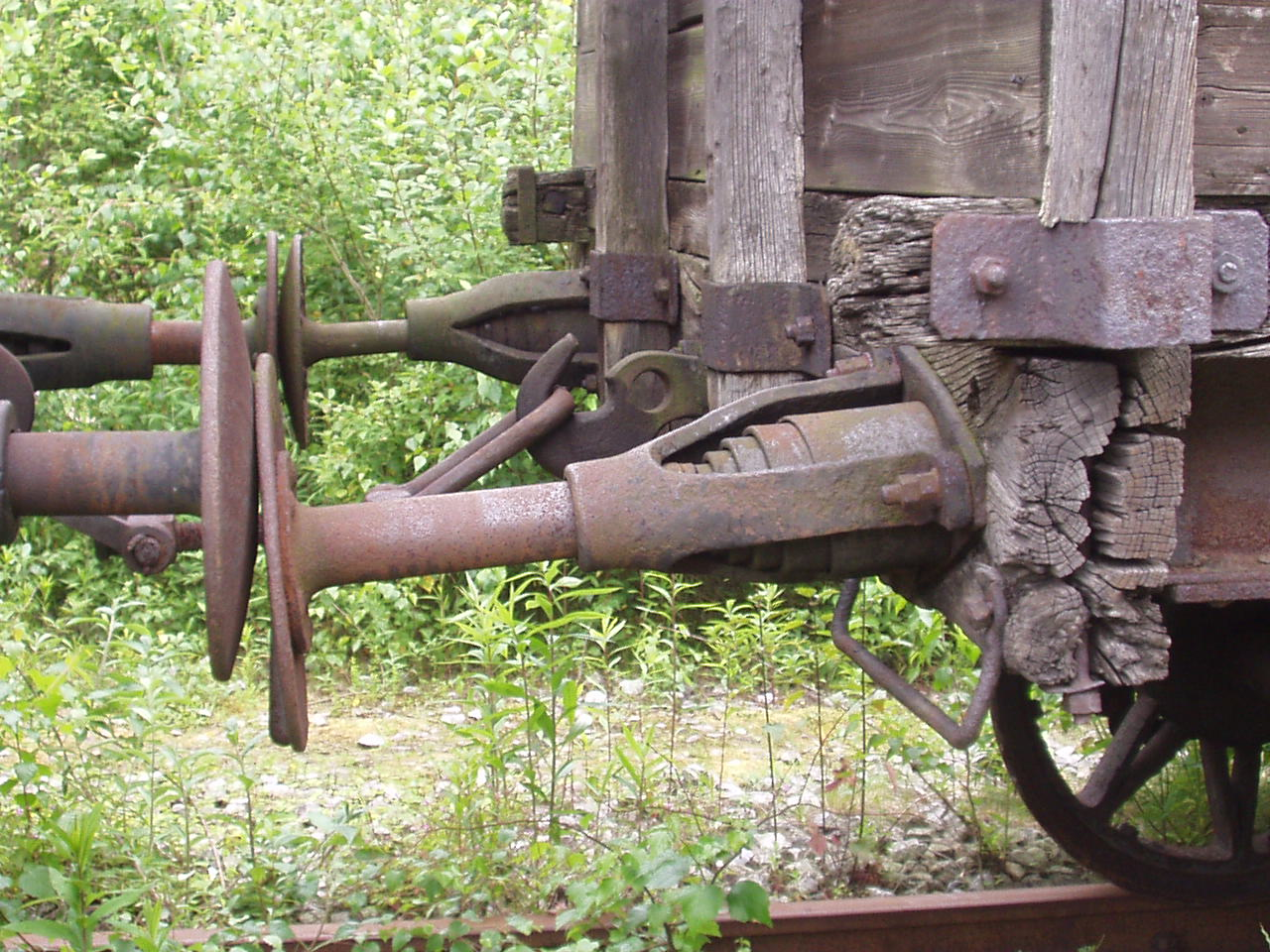
Volute springs within buffer assemblies on a railway car

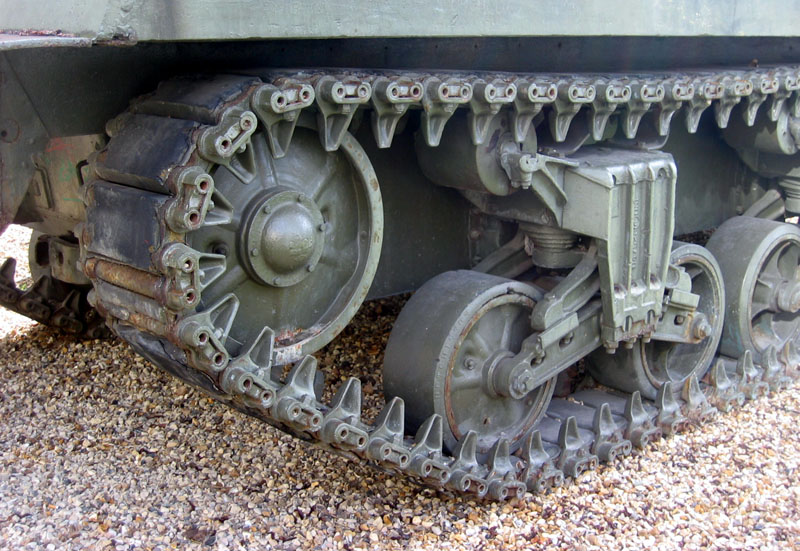
Volute spring suspension on an M4 Sherman tank (in service 1942–1957)

== See also ==
- Coil spring
