= Gustav Wittfeld =

German engineer

Gustav Wittfeld (27 October 1855 – 24 September 1923) was a German engineer.

== Life ==
Gustav Wittfeld was born in Aachen, Germany, on 27 October 1855. After attending state school he studied at the polytechnic in Aachen from 1874 to 1878. Following that the young engineer joined the Prussian state railways. He spent his early years in the railway divisions of Bromberg, Cassel, Frankfurt am Main, Cologne and Berlin.

He was promoted to government master builder (Regierungsbaumeister) in 1884 and was involved in the construction of Frankfurt (Main) Hauptbahnhof. After transferring to the Berlin railway division in 1891 he again joined the department for the construction and procurement of locomotives within the Prussian state railways. He played a major part in the committee set up for Prussian locomotive construction standards.

In 1902, at the instigation of Wittfeld, the Prussian railway administration and AEG began trials with single-phase alternating current for use as a source of traction. The testing lasted until 1906 and took place on the 4.1 km long suburban route from Niederschöneweide to Spindlersfeld (near Berlin) using 6 kV 25 Hz AC. This technology was used initially when the Hamburg-Altona City and Suburban Railway was electrified, a venture in which Wittfeld was also involved. Wittfeld was the first to recorgnise the importance of single-phase AC for electric traction and was a driving force behind the electrification of the first standard gauge railway in Germany from Dessau to Bitterfeld opened on 1 April 1911.

In 1904, with Wittfeld's involvement, two 2'B2'n3v - experimental steam locomotives emerged: "Altona 561 and Altona 562" with streamlining and a cab at the front. After these proved a failure due to the cost of the trial, Gustav Wittfeld turned increasingly to electric traction and designed the Prussian Class ES, EP and EG electric locomotives. Even today the design of the Class AT 3 accumulator cars (later DRG Class ETA 178) is associated with the name of Wittfeld. They were still in service until the early 1960s. These designs and his perseverance earned Wittfeld the reputation of being a trailblazer in the field of electric train transportation.

In 1917 he became an honorary Doctor of Engineering at the TH Charlottenburg for his work on the electrification of the railways. In 1918 he was promoted to Wirklicher Geheimer Oberbaurat and retired in 1920. As his successor he appointed Wilhelm Wechmann, later to become Chief Electrical Engineer of the Deutsche Reichsbahn.

On 24 September 1923, plagued from ill-health, Wittfeld committed suicide.

== See also ==
- List of railway pioneers

== Sources ==
- de:Gustav Wittfeld
- Kirsche, Hans-Joachim (1978). Lexicon der Eisenbahn (5th ed.). transpress.
