= Richard von Helmholtz =

German engineer and locomotive designer (1852-1934)

Richard Wilhelm Ferdinand von Helmholtz (28 September 1852 – 10 September 1934) was a German engineer and designer of steam locomotives. Richard von Helmholtz was born on 28 September 1852 in Königsberg, Prussia, the son of the physicist Hermann von Helmholtz and his first wife Olga, née von Velten.

== Career ==
After studying in Stuttgart and Munich, in 1873 he began his career as a design engineer at the Krauss locomotive works in Munich, where he soon rose to become head of the design bureau. In this capacity, he had a considerable influence on the destiny of the company for decades, especially after the retirement of Georg Krauss from the management in 1885.

=== Innovations ===
In the course of his career he worked on all the components making up a locomotive, including less conspicuous parts such as his development of a new type of sander.

In 1887 he conducted ground-breaking research into the behaviour of locomotives on curves. From this theoretical work a practical result ensued in 1888: the design of the Krauss-Helmholtz bogie, which saw widespread use on locomotives with carrying wheels - and not only on steam locomotives. The Austrian designer, Karl Gölsdorf, drew even wider-ranging conclusions from the work of Helmholtz and created a radially-sliding coupled axle, the so-called Gölsdorf axle, which became a standard in the construction of locomotives.

=== Locomotive designs ===
Of the many locomotive classes designed under his direction, a few examples are given here:

- In 1888 the Bavarian D VIII, the last one of which was still in service in 1958.
- In 1896 the Bavarian AA I, of which only one was built.
- In 1897 the Bavarian D XII (Pt2/5), and virtually identical Palatine P2.II, of which a total of 174 engines were built.
- In 1908 the Palatine P 5 and Bavarian Pt3/6, which ran for almost 50 years.

=== Criticism ===
In such a long and innovative career, the occasional mistake was to be expected. For example, the Palatine P 3.II which was built in 1900 and displayed at the 1900 World Exhibition in Paris was an express train locomotive with a dolly axle. This design did not acquit itself well; as early as 1902 the dolly axle was removed and the engine converted into a normal 2'B1' locomotive.

== Retirement and death ==
After his retirement, he remained connected to the world of locomotives. Blessed with an excellent memory well into old age, he occupied himself, partly as an author and partly as a publisher, with recording the historical development of the steam locomotive. He died on 10 September 1934 in Munich.

== Publications ==
- Richard von Helmholtz, Wilhelm Staby: Die Entwicklung der Lokomotive im Gebiete des Vereins deutscher Eisenbahnverwaltungen. Oldenbourg, München und Berlin 1930. (Reprint: Callwey, München 1981. ISBN 3-7667-0542-3)
- Richard von Helmholtz: Die historischen Lokomotiven der Badischen Staats-Eisenbahnen. Reichsbahndirektion Karlsruhe, 1936. (Reprint: Deutsche Gesellschaft für Eisenbahngeschichte, 1982, ISBN 3-921700-36-1)

== See also ==
- List of railway pioneers

== Sources ==
- Günter Metzeltin: Die Lokomotive – Lexikon ihrer Erfinder, Konstrukteure, Führer u. Förderer. Deutsche Gesellschaft für Eisenbahngeschichte, Karlsruhe 1971
- Karl-Ernst Maedel, Alfred B. Gottwaldt: Deutsche Dampflokomotiven – Die Entwicklungsgeschichte. Transpress, Berlin 1994, ISBN 3-344-70912-7
