= Johann Brotan =

Austrian mechanical engineer

Johann Brotan (24 June 1843 – 20 November 1918) was an Austrian mechanical engineer, specialising in locomotive construction.

== Biography ==
Johann Brotan was born in Klattau, now Klatovy in the Czech Republic. He studied at the Imperial-Royal Polytechnic Institute (k. k. Polytechnisches Institut) in Vienna, Austria.

He worked for the state telegraph construction department, for Theis Railway Company, the Hungarian Eastern Railway and the Lemberg-Czernowitz-Jassy Railway before joining the Imperial Royal Austrian State Railways (kaiserlich-königliche österreichische Staatsbahnen or k.k.St.B.) in 1890.

In 1902 he became the executive of the k.k.St.B. workshop at Gmünd, later the repair shop at Vienna's Westbahnhof. He retired in 1912 and, according to one source, died in Vienna on 20 November 1918. According to other sources, he is believed to have died in 1923, but trace of him was lost in the disorganisation following the First World War.

He is known for his invention of the most successful semi water-tube locomotive boiler, known as the Brotan boiler, first fitted in 1902.

== See also ==
- List of railway pioneers

== Sources ==
- Kirsche, Hans-Joachim (1978). Lexicon der Eisenbahn (5th ed.). transpress.
- Ransome-Wallis, P. (2001) [1959]. Illustrated Encyclopedia of World Railway Locomotives. Dover Publications, Inc. ISBN 0-486-41247-4.
