= Karl Gustav Brescius =

Karl Gustav (Guido) Brescius (25 March 1824 – 4 December 1864) was a German railway engineer.

He was born in Bautzen, in eastern Saxony, Germany, on 25 March 1824 and studied at the Dresden University of Technology in Saxony. Amongst his lecturers were Professor Andreas Schubert.

Brescius gained his first practical experience as a railway engineer during the construction of the Saxon-Silesian Railway (Sächsisch-Schlesische Eisenbahn) from Dresden to Görlitz. For the construction of the Saxon-Bohemian Railway from Dresden to Bodenbach in 1847 Brescius was already the departmental engineer responsible for the section of the route in the area of Königstein.

== Albert Railway ==
In 1853 Guido Brescius signed an employment contract as a master machinist and construction engineer with the Albert Railway (Albertsbahn AG). As a result, he was responsible for planning and overseeing the construction of the railway line from Dresden to Tharandt, the Niederhermsdorf and Hänichen coal branch lines.

== Windberg Railway ==
In planning the Hänichen coal line, Brescius took a risk with a route that was artificially long in order to overcome the height difference between Plauenscher Grund and the Gittersee plateau, with inclines of 1:40 on an adhesion railway and with curves of as little as 85 m radius on a standard gauge main line. In 1856 it was completed; the first mountain railway in Germany and only the second to be built in Europe after the Semmering Railway (Semmeringbahn) in Austria. For this reason King John of Saxony gave the coal line the nickname The Saxon Semmering Railway (Sächsische Semmeringbahn) and rightly so. The Hänichen coal branch still partially exists today as a technical monument, the Windberg Railway (Windbergbahn).

== End of his life ==
His arguments with the supervisory board of the Albert Railway and his study trips to England had a detrimental effect on the health of Guido Brescius. He died prematurely on 4 December 1864 in the mental home at Sonnenstein in Pirna.

== See also ==
- List of railway pioneers

== Sources ==
- de:Karl Gustav Brescius
