= Buffer (rail transport) =

Part of the coupling system used in some railway systems

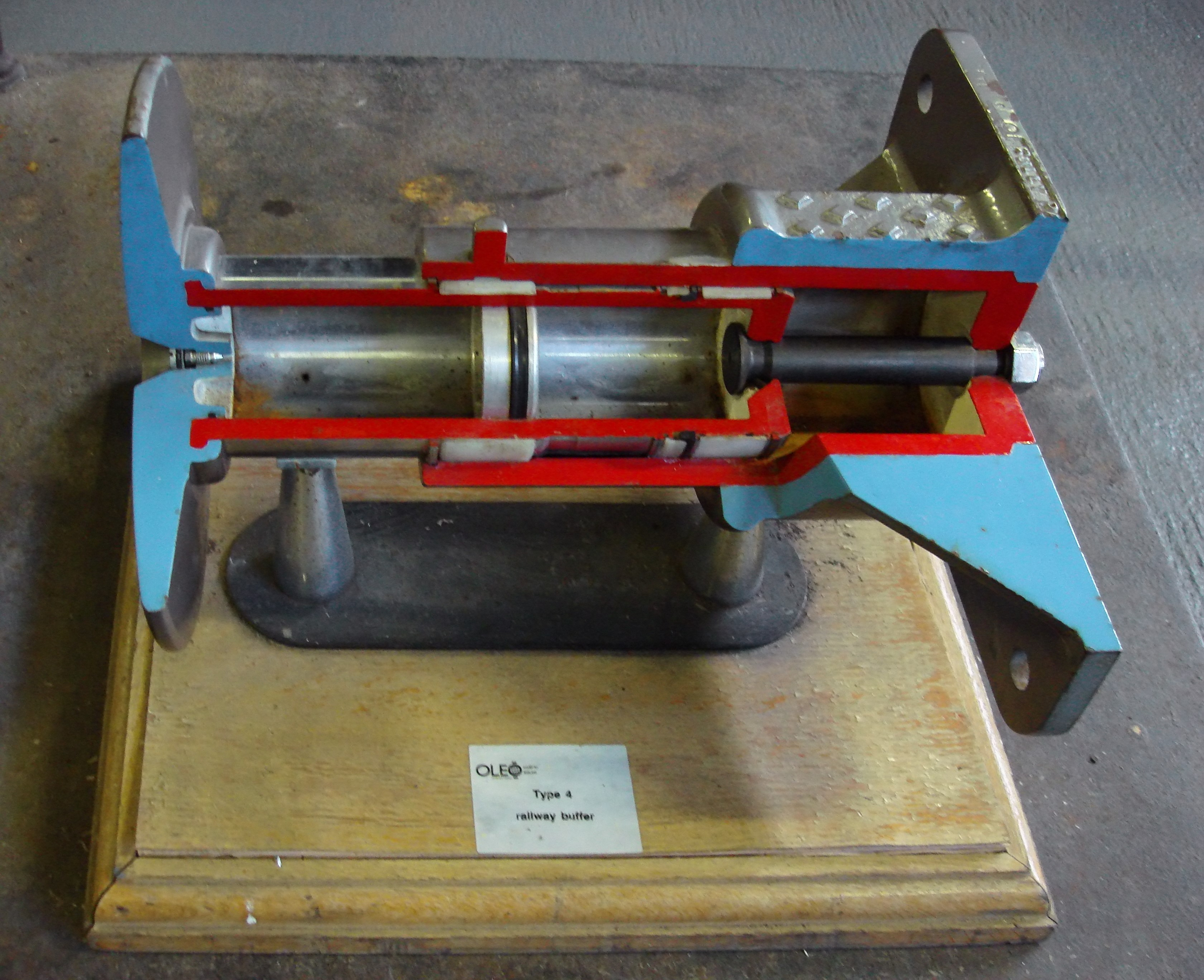
A pneumatic buffer with sections cut away

A buffer is a part of the buffers and chain coupler system used on the railway systems of many countries, among them most of those in Europe, for attaching railway vehicles together (in North America, rolling stock instead has draft gear built into the couplers).

== Description ==
Fitted at the ends of the vehicle frames on the buffer beam, one at each corner, the buffers are projecting, shock-absorbing pads which, when vehicles are coupled, are brought into contact with those on the next vehicle. The buffer itself comprises the buffer plates which take the impact.

The draw chain used between each pair of vehicles includes a screw which is tightened after coupling to shorten the chain and keep the buffers pressed together. Such is known as a 'screw coupling'. Historically, coupling chains were no more than that, a short length of heavy chain (typically three links long) with no adjustment. These would result in a 'loose-coupled train' in which the buffers of adjacent vehicles would only touch when the coupling chain was fully slack, such as when being pushed or going down hill.

== Design ==
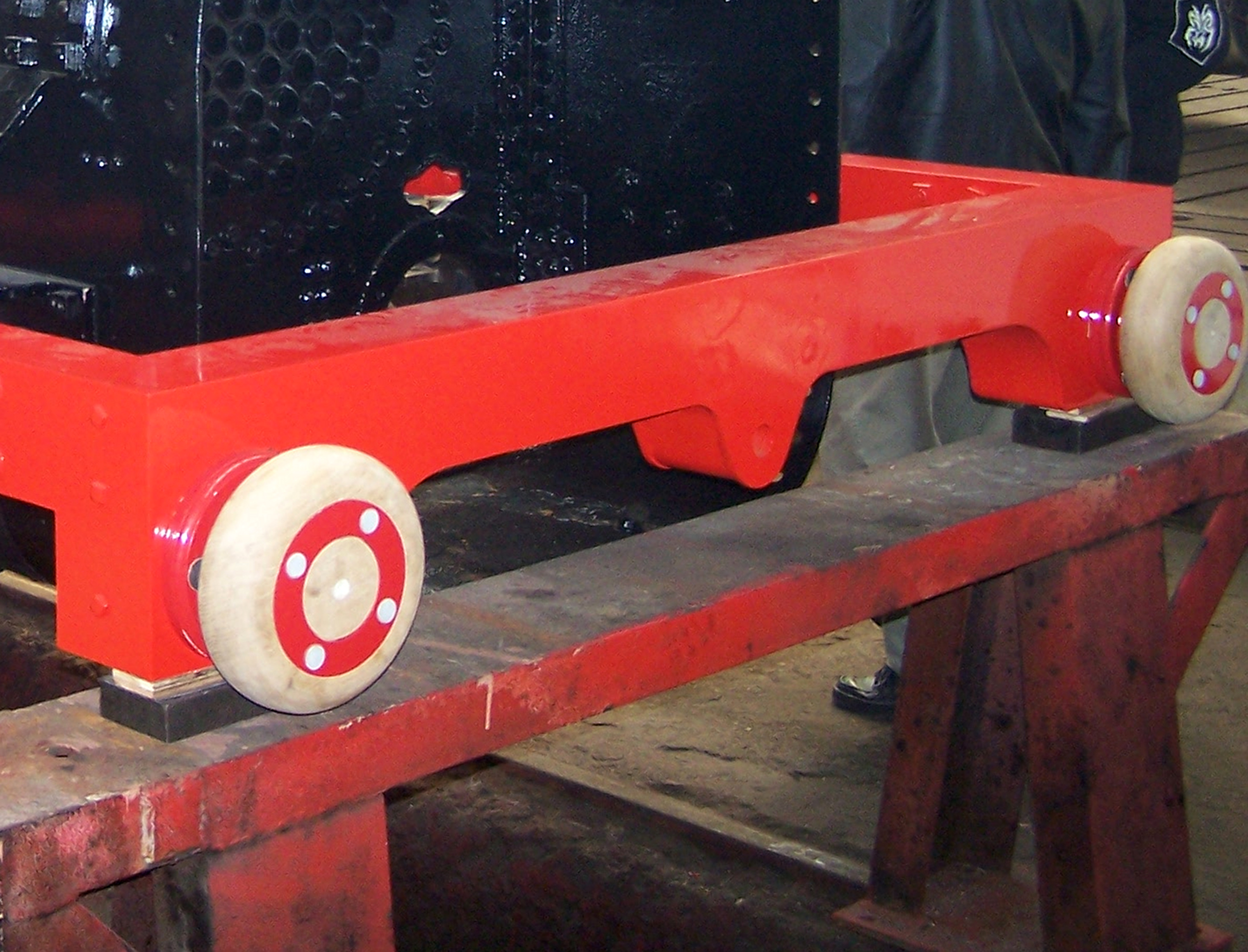
Unpainted wooden buffers on the 1935 replica of the Adler

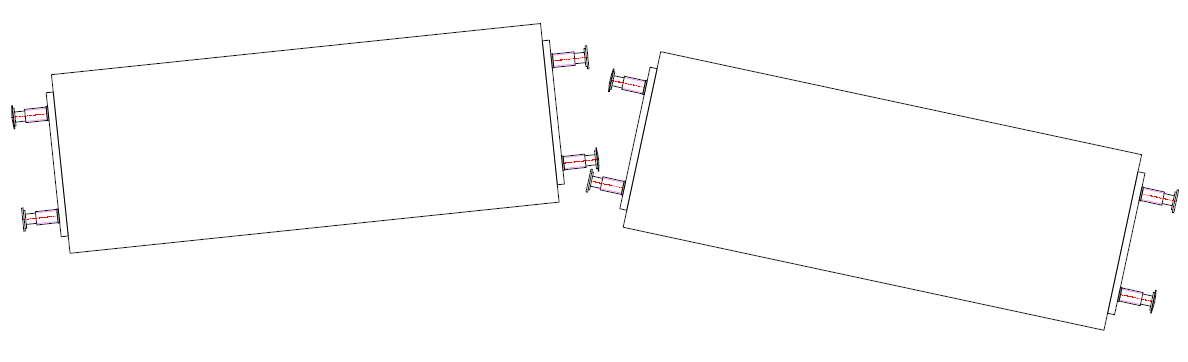
Buffer-locking

=== Wooden buffers ===
The buffers in the very earliest days of railways were rigid dumb buffers made of wooden blocks with a metal cap at the end. For example, Germany's first commercially successful locomotive, the Adler, built in 1835, had wooden buffers.

In the 1830s the first spring-loaded buffers were introduced on the Liverpool & Manchester Railway and during the mid-19th century sprung buffers were fitted to all coaches and wagons.

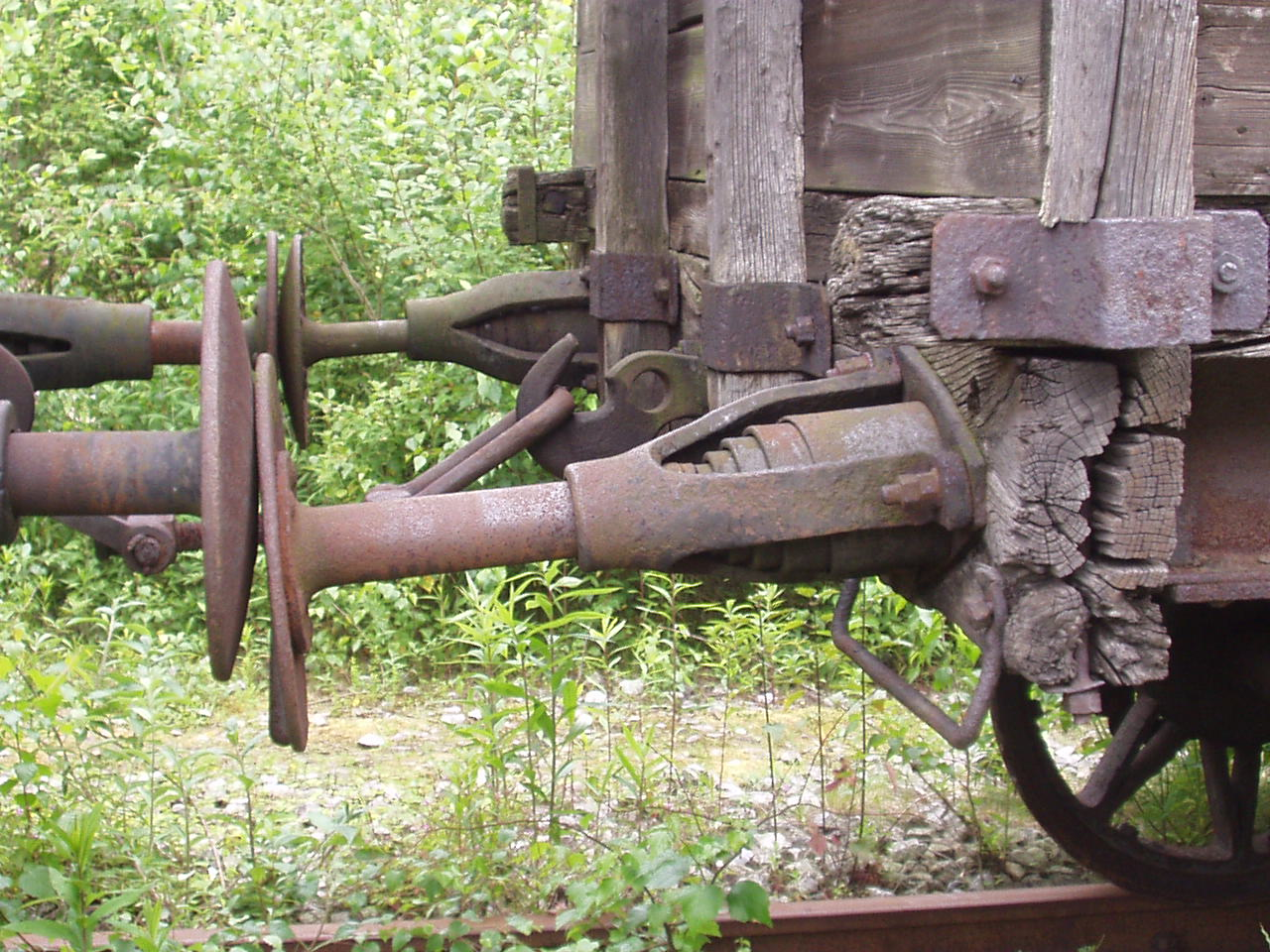
Rod buffer with spiral spring

The original English buffer plates were the same on each side, so that there was an occasional tendency for them to slide off each other and become locked. German railway buffer plates are flat on one side and convex on the other to reduce this tendency to slide off.

=== Rod buffers ===
The rod buffer was the earliest German type of sprung buffer. The first ones consisted of a steel rod that carried the buffer plate at one end. The buffer rod pushed backwards on a spiral volute spring (coil spring), which was supported by a strong sheet metal cylindrical sleeve. Compressing the spring absorbed the impact. The first spring-loaded buffers were invented by John Baillie in 1846.

Rod buffers can only be found on museum vehicles in Europe today. They are still common in Argentina.

=== Plunger buffers ===
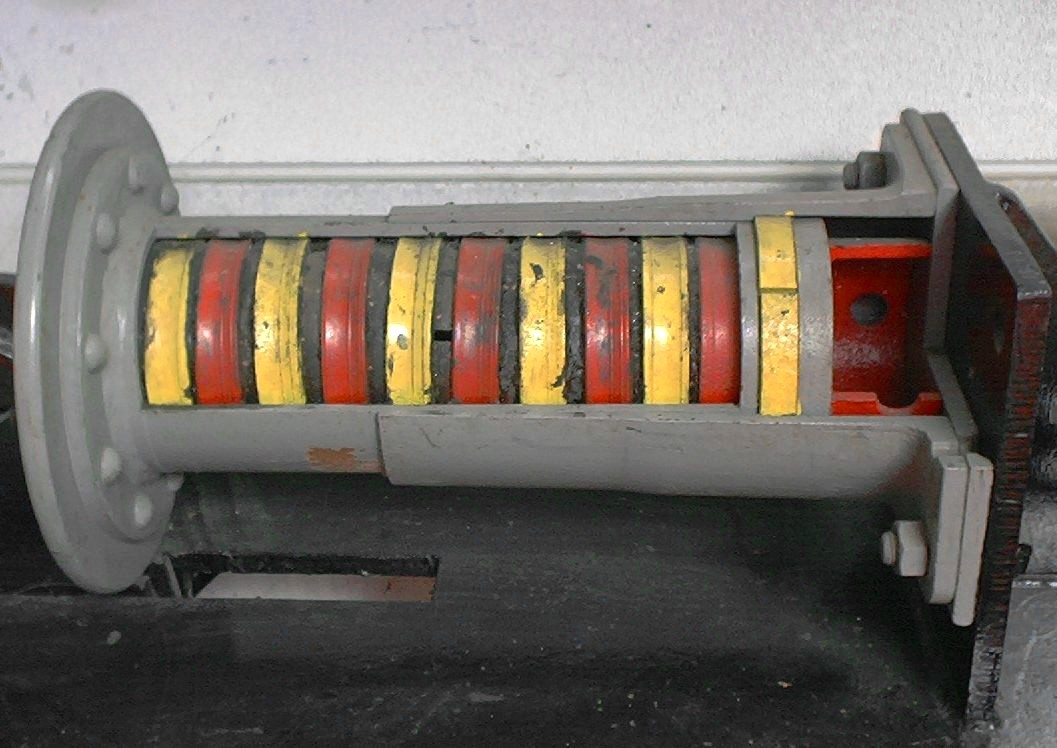
Plunger buffer with coil springs (cut open for demonstration)

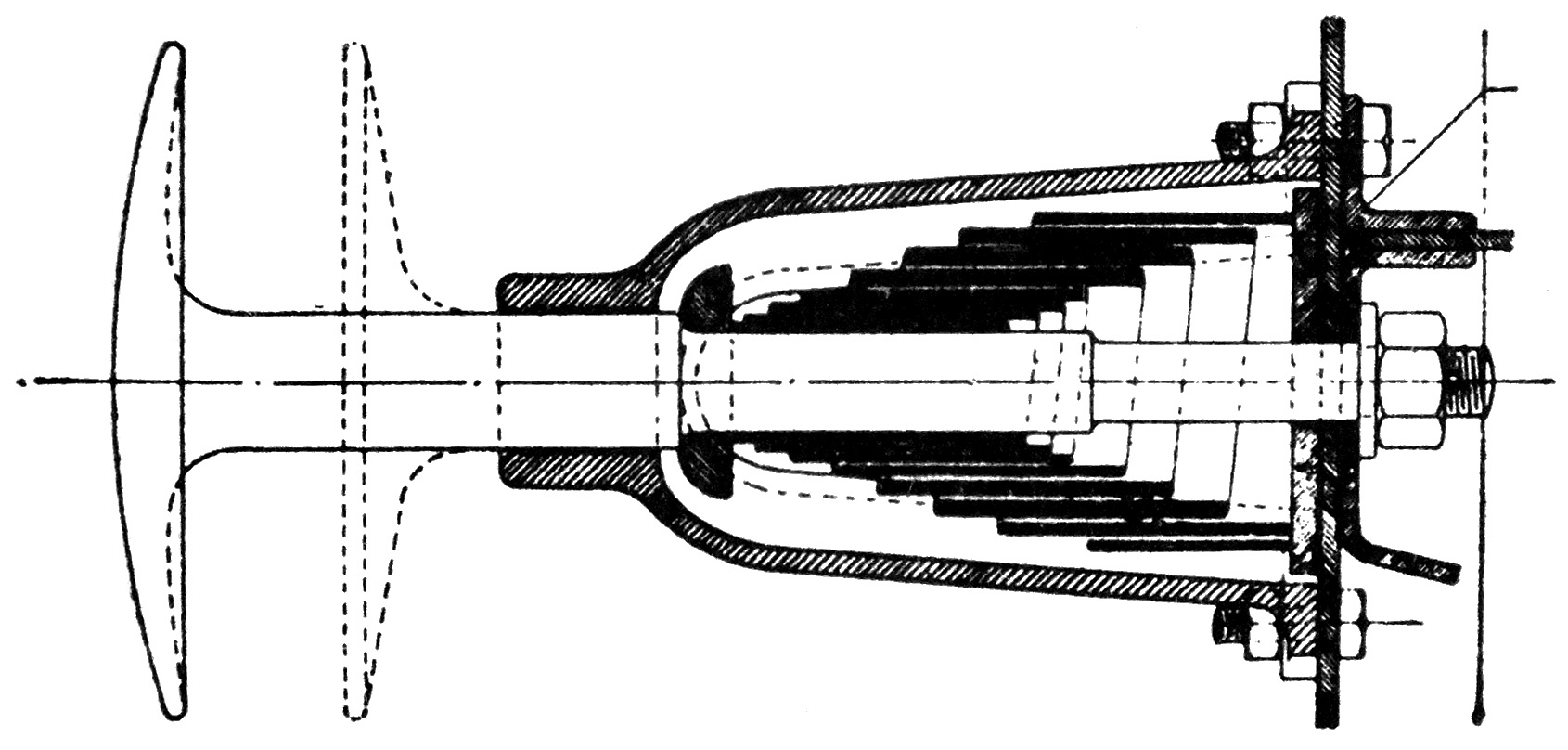
Diagram showing volute spring within the buffer assembly of a railway car (with dotted lines showing compressed position), invented 1848

Since the relatively thin buffer rods often bent during operation and caused major damage in accidents, the German state railways developed the plunger buffer. The buffer plate sits on a steel tube with a larger diameter, which is therefore more resistant to bending.

The volute spring system initially still used for the plunger buffers had the disadvantage that the energy put into compression was completely released again, so that the vehicles were pushed apart again after the impact. This required trains to be braked evenly and, above all, not just at certain points in order to avoid oscillations in the train, which inter alia can cause the couplings to break. An improvement was made by using ring springs, as these convert most of the input energy into frictional heat.

=== Centre buffer couplings ===
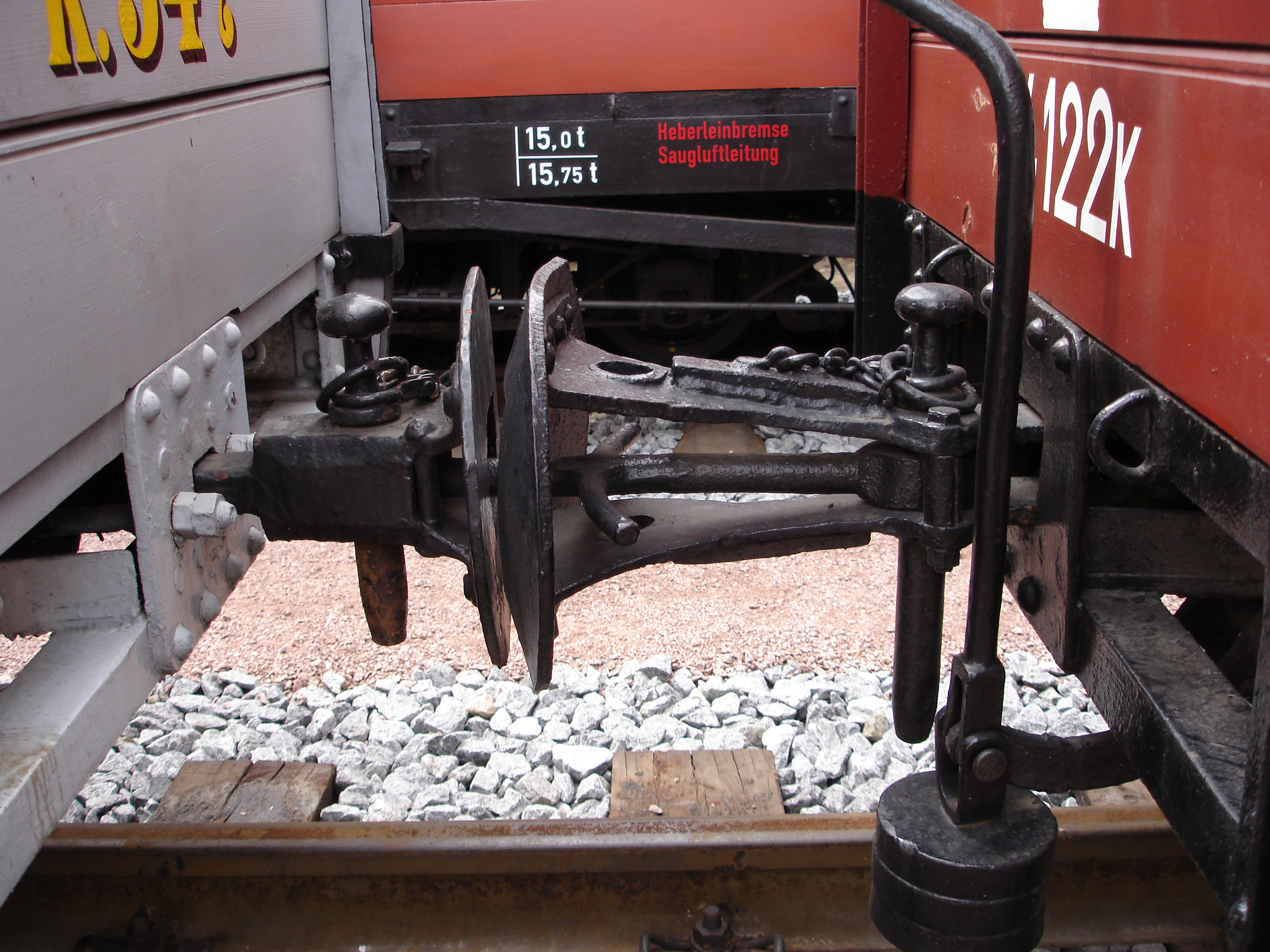
Center buffer coupling on the Saxon narrow-gauge railways

With centre buffer couplings, the tasks of buffers are usually transferred to the coupling elements, which are designed to be correspondingly stable and are mounted with interposed spring elements within the vehicle frame instead of on a buffer beam. They are often used on narrow gauge railways and funiculars.

=== Modern buffers ===
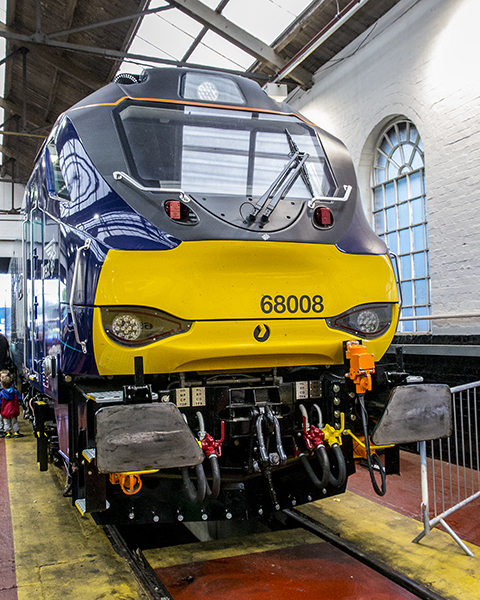
Although buffers on passenger stock is mostly gone, several modern locomotives in Britain, including the Class 68, still retain buffers.

The buffers fitted to modern locomotives and rolling stock incorporate oleo-pneumatic shock absorbers.

== Standardisation ==
In the early days of the railway, each railway company determined the positioning and arrangement of the couplings and buffers at its own discretion. But once the railway network began to develop from the first independently built routes, this hampered the transfer of wagons. Railway vehicles that were to be transferred to other parts of the network, run by other companies, had to be equipped with several buffers or coupling systems. Founded in 1882, the International Conference for Promoting Technical Uniformity on Railways specified the dimensions for buffer positions and distances customary in England and northern Germany as a standard.

- For all vehicles built from 1 January 1939, the distance according to RIV §38 was set at 1,750 mm (5 ft 9 in) ± 10 mm (0.39 in).
- The centre of the buffer on European railway vehicles must be between 940 and 1,065 mm (3 ft 1.0 in and 3 ft 5.9 in) above the top of rail.

Spain was an exception for a long time. A buffer separation of 1,950 mm (6 ft 5 in) was specified there because of the force transmitted to the longitudinal beams of the wagons, which are further apart due to their broad gauge railways. Wagons that were designed for transit were therefore given wider buffer plates. Spain's conversion to the international standard took place up to the 1990s. Extra-wide buffer plates are still common in Spain, and French Corail wagons were also equipped with them. The wider buffer spacing is also common on the broad gauge networks of Portugal, India, Pakistan, Bangladesh and Sri Lanka, and Argentina. Due to the lower throughput of Portuguese wagons into the standard gauge network, extra-wide buffer plates are less common in Portugal. Passenger coaches for long-distance traffic were almost completely equipped with them. As a result of railway stock sales, locomotives and wagons with extra-wide Iberian buffers also reached Argentina.

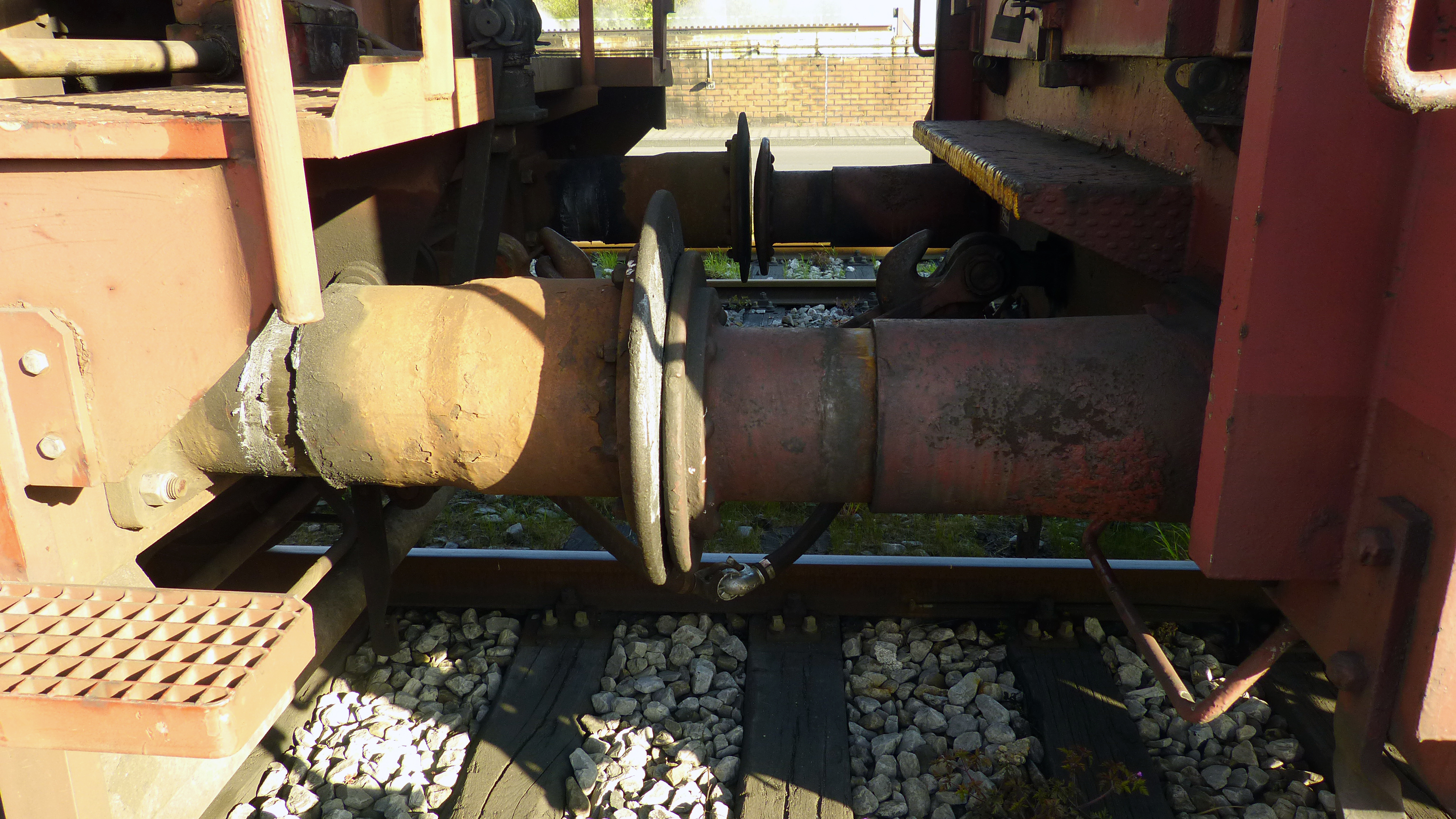
Direct comparison between normal buffer (right) and high-performance buffer (left) for freight wagons

Standardised buffers are used by European railway companies:

- Freight wagon: Buffer with 75 mm (3.0 in) stroke UIC 526-2 VE 1981-01. However, these buffers are no longer in use.
- Freight wagon: Buffer with 105 mm (4.1 in) stroke UIC 526-1 VE 1998-07
- Freight wagons: buffers with 130 / 150 mm (5.1 / 5.9 in) stroke UIC 526-3V 1998-07
- Passenger coach buffers: UIC 528 VE 1991-01

The aforementioned UIC leaflets were replaced by the EN 15551 standard after the introduction of the TSI Interoperability Guidelines.

=== Shape ===
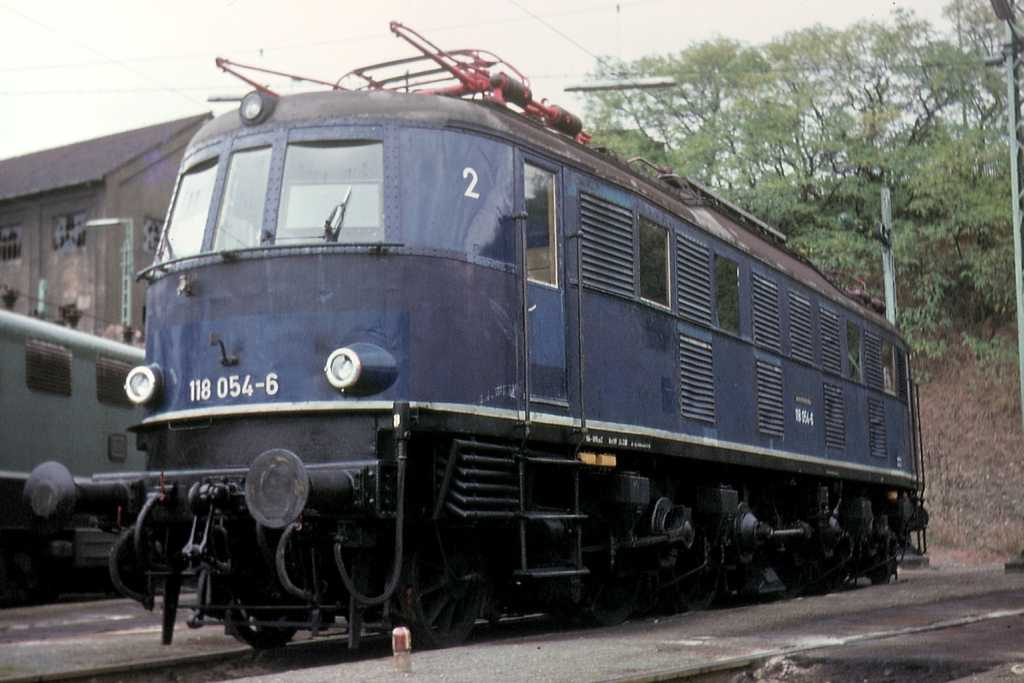
Convex and flat buffer plates are easily recognizable on this Class E 18

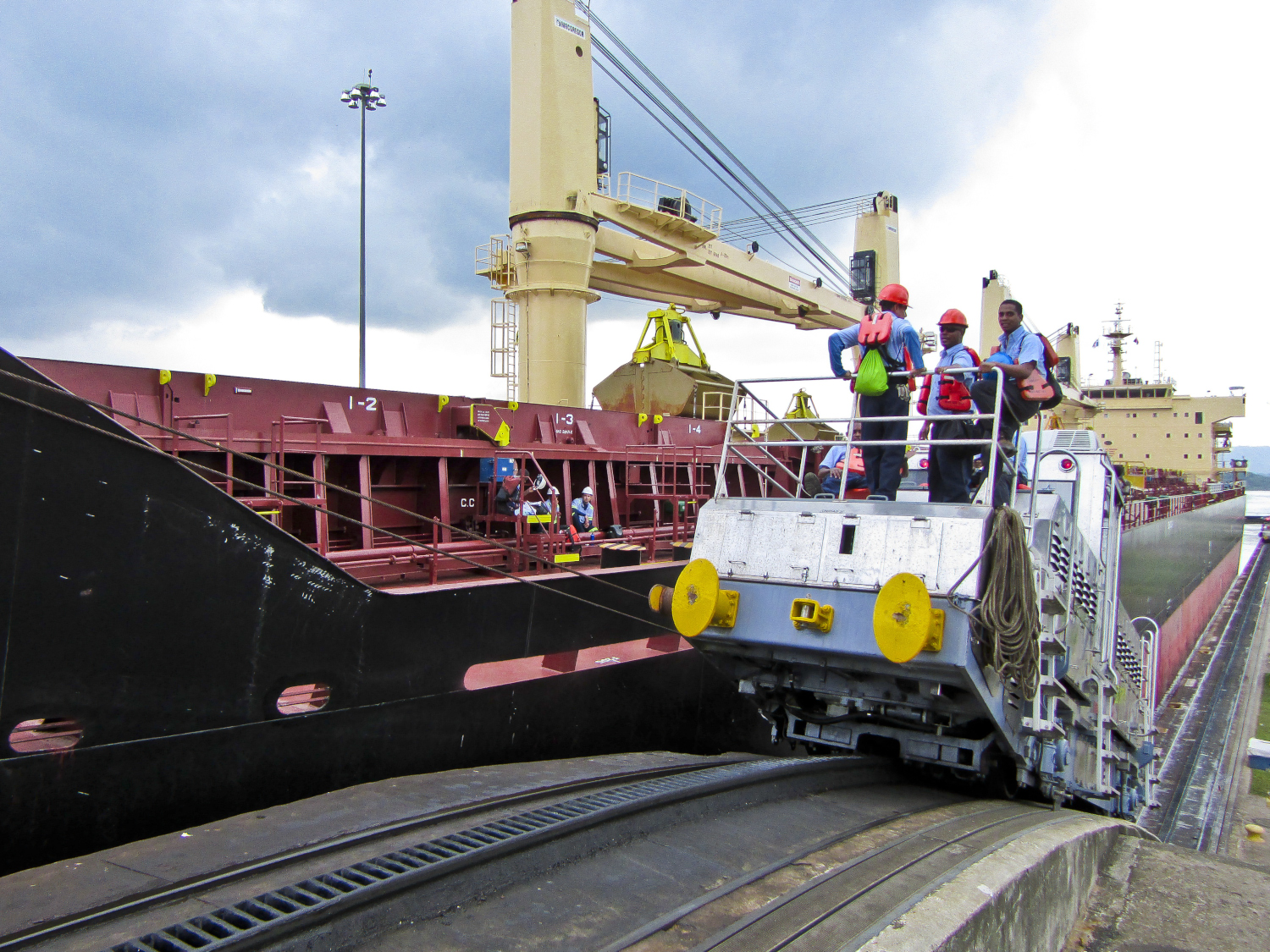
Short buffers on a Panama canal mule

In many cases, the buffer on the left-hand side in the direction of travel was designed with a flat plate, and the one on the right with a curved plate, so that a flat plate and a curved plate always meet, thereby avoiding edge pressure.

According to the 1961 UIC regulations, all vehicles in Europe were to be equipped with buffer plates that were curved on both sides but much flatter. The radius of the buffer curvature is 1,500 mm (4 ft 11 in) for passenger coaches and 2,750 mm (9 ft 0 in) for freight wagons built from 1994. Round buffer plates with a diameter of 340, 370, 450, or 500 mm (13, 15, 18, or 20 in) are common on freight wagons. Rectangular plate shapes are generally used for passenger coaches and locomotives, with the edge nearer the longitudinal centre of the vehicle being bevelled on passenger coaches due to the space required by the coach gangways. There are also buffer plates of other shapes and widths, with the height between the upper and lower horizontal edge being between 340 and 360 mm (13 and 14 in). According to EN 15551, the standardised widths for freight wagon buffers are 450 or 550 mm (18 or 22 in), for Spain 550 or 650 mm (26 in) with a height of 340 mm. For passenger coaches, the buffer plate widths are between 600 and 720 mm (24 and 28 in), depending on the vehicle geometry. Buffers with non-circular buffer heads cannot be rotated in any case.

The remaining free space between the vehicles is referred to as the Berne Space (Berner Raum)

A British specialty are pull-out buffers on passenger coaches and locomotives with hinged central buffer couplings of the Janney design. If similar vehicles are connected using these central buffer couplings, the buffers are pushed in and ineffective. For coupling vehicles that are only equipped with screw couplings, the buffers are pulled out and locked in this position with locking pieces.

== Buffer stops ==
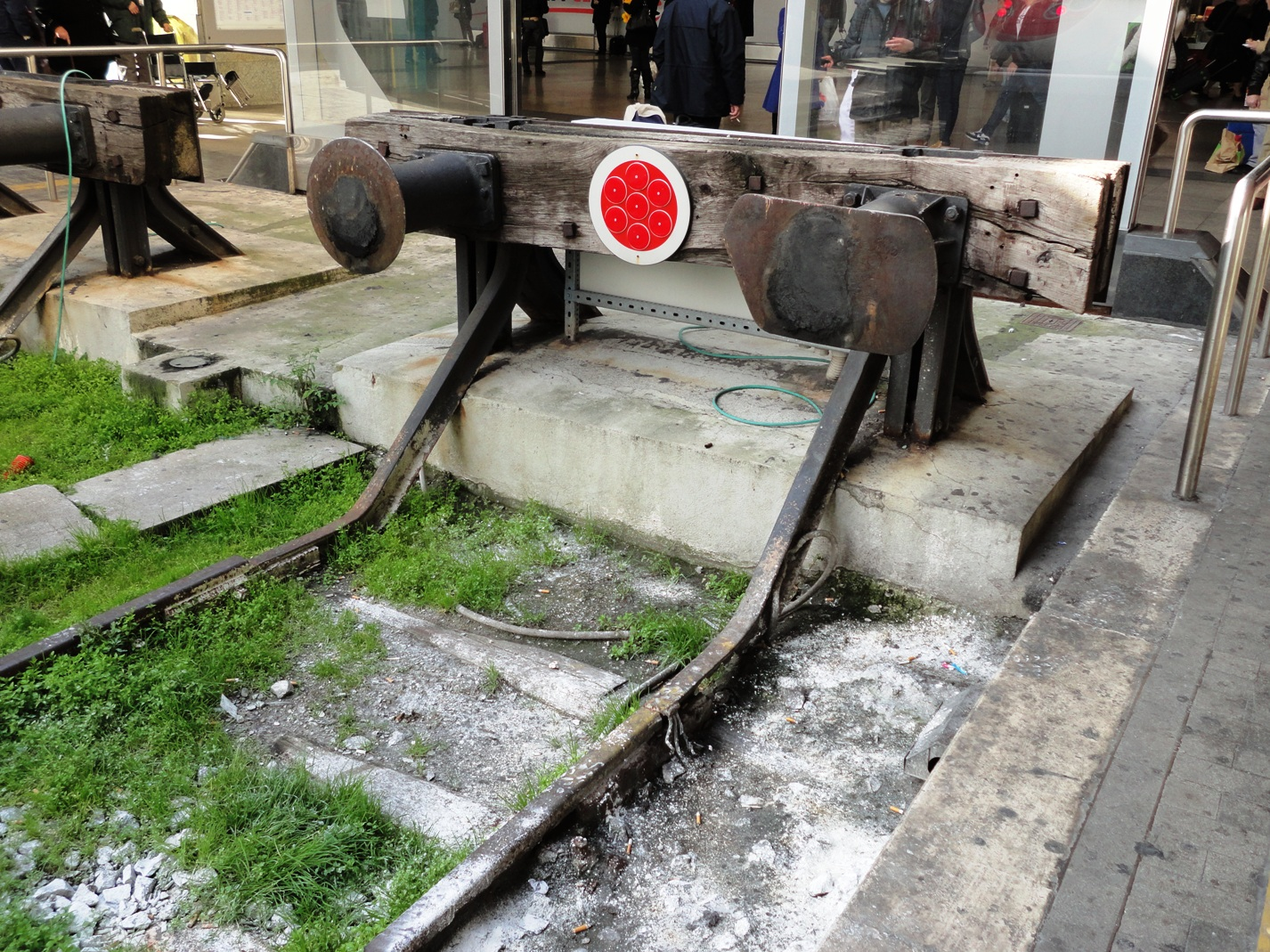
A buffer stop in Italy

Dead-end sidings are often fitted with buffer stops to prevent vehicles running off the end of the track. These may consist of a simple transverse beam fixed at buffer height but the buffer stops at passenger stations can be elaborate hydraulic installations capable of absorbing a considerable amount of energy.

Friction buffer stops are clamped 'loosely' to the rails, and when hit by a train that fails to stop correctly, move with the train for perhaps 30 m (98 ft) scraping the top of the rails, which absorbs considerable energy.

== Collisions ==
In violent collisions, the buffers of adjacent carriages may become displaced relative to one another, allowing the carriages to telescope which is very dangerous. The risk of this can be reduced if the buffers (or fake buffers) have corrugations that grip each other and prevent the buffers becoming displaced and so leading to telescoping.

== See also ==
- Anticlimber
- Buffer stop
- Bumper (car)
- Cushioning
- Draw gear
- Headstock (on which buffers are mounted)
- Railway coupling
- Shock absorber
