= Louis Adolf Gölsdorf =

Austrian engineer

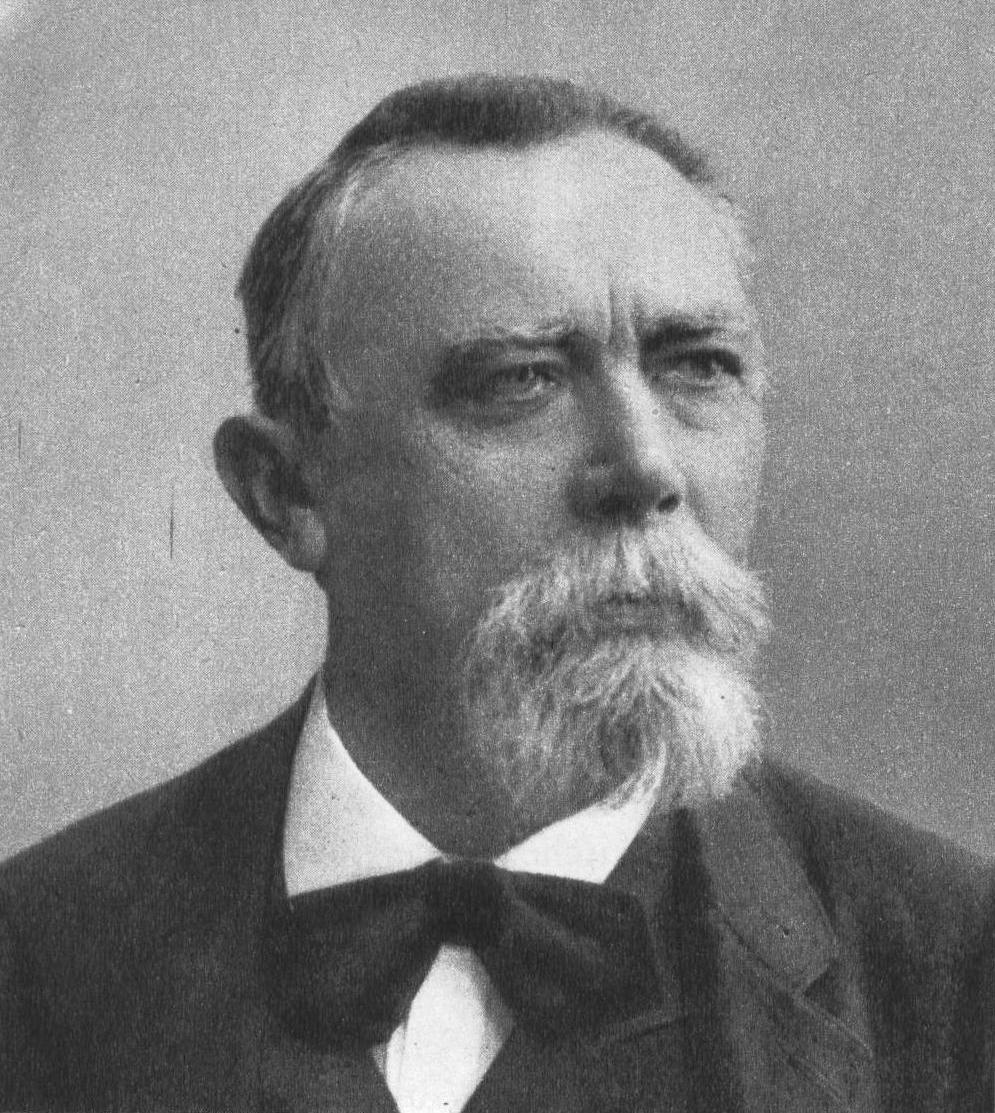
Louis Adolf Gölsdorf.

Louis Adolf Gölsdorf (16 February 1837 – 28 November 1911) was an Austrian engineer and locomotive designer. He was the father of Karl Gölsdorf.

Louis Adolf Gölsdorf was born in Plaue, Austria, on 16 February 1837 and educated in Chemnitz and Dresden in the Kingdom of Saxony at various technical schools before taking up technical work for the Leipzig–Dresden Railway Company. In 1860 he became a mechanical engineer with the Lokomotivfabrik der StEG in Vienna, but moved in 1861 to the Austrian Southern Railway, the Südbahn, where he soon took on a leading role in the locomotive design office. From 1885 to 1908 he was the chief mechanical engineer (Maschinendirektor) of the Southern Railway (Südbahn).

In addition to his own locomotive designs, he developed the so-called Gepäcklokomotive (luggage locomotive) with Anton Elbel, an economical type of locomotive with its own luggage compartment that was deployed on several Austro-Hungarian railways.

He died on 28 November 1911 in Vienna.

== See also ==
- List of railway pioneers

== Sources ==
- de:Louis Adolf Gölsdorf
