= John Baillie (railway engineer) =

English mechanical engineer

John Baillie (10 May 1806 – 29 October 1859) was an English mechanical engineer who worked mainly in Austria and Germany.

John Baillie was born in Newcastle-upon-Tyne, England, on 10 May 1806. He joined the Emperor Ferdinand Northern Railway (Kaiser-Ferdinands-Nordbahn or KFNB) in 1836 when the locomotives ordered by the company from George Stephenson arrived and instructed the Austrian staff of the KFNB on the locomotives.

In 1839 he founded the Nordbahn workshop at Floridsdorf. In 1841 he took up a post with Emil Kessler in Karlsruhe, southern Germany, where he assisted Kessler in introducing his first steam locomotive, the Badenia. In 1845, he switched to the Hungarian Central Railway. In 1846 he invented the Baillie Schneckenfeder, a type of coiled spring named after him, which was fitted to the buffers of railway vehicles.

He died on 29 October 1859 in Vienna, Austria.

== See also ==
- List of railway pioneers
