= Johann Rihosek =

- Born: 5 June 1869; Maków Podhalański, Galicia, Austria-Hungary
- Died: 21 November 1956 (aged 87); Vienna
- Engineering career
- Discipline: Mechanical engineering

Johann Rihosek (5 June 1869 – 21 November 1956) was an Austrian engineer and locomotive designer. He was born in Maków Podhalański, in Austro-Hungarian Galicia (present-day Poland) on 5 June 1869. Rihosek attended the middle school at Olmütz and later studied mechanical engineering at the Vienna Technical University.

== Career ==
In 1893 he took up his post as a design engineer with the Wiener Lokomotivfabrik Floridsdorf. From 1897 he worked in the Department for Locomotive and Coach Construction headed by Karl Gölsdorf within the Imperial Royal Railway Ministry. After Gölsdorf's death in 1916 Rihosek became his successor.

The First World War and its consequences placed heavy demands on Rihosek, because the lack of materials led to problems in the manufacture of vehicles. Following the dividing up of the locomotive fleet to the new states formed from the breakup of the Austro-Hungarian empire, replacements had to be procured. This resulted in the emergence of the following classes:

- ÖBB 156 (BBÖ 270)
- ÖBB 58 (BBÖ 81)
- ÖBB 95 (BBÖ 82)

In 1924 Rihosek left the ministry (now called the Ministry for Trade and Transport) and became an honorary lecturer for locomotive construction at the Vienna Technical University. In 1936 he became reader there and in 1944 received an honorary doctorate.

== Picture gallery ==
Locomotives designed by Johann Rihosek

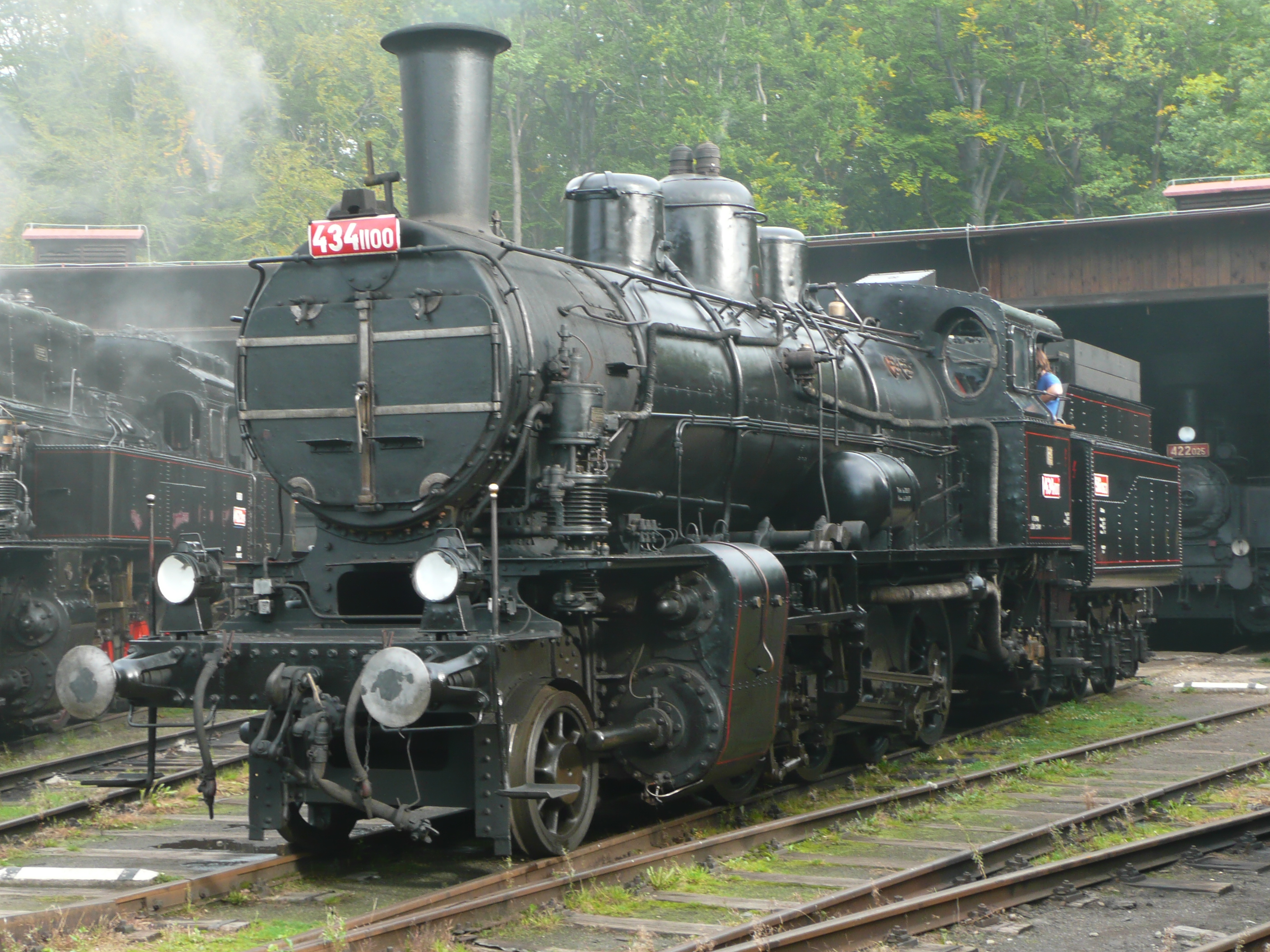
Steam locomotive 434.1100 in railway museum, Lužná u Rakovníka. OBB class 156, BBO class 270

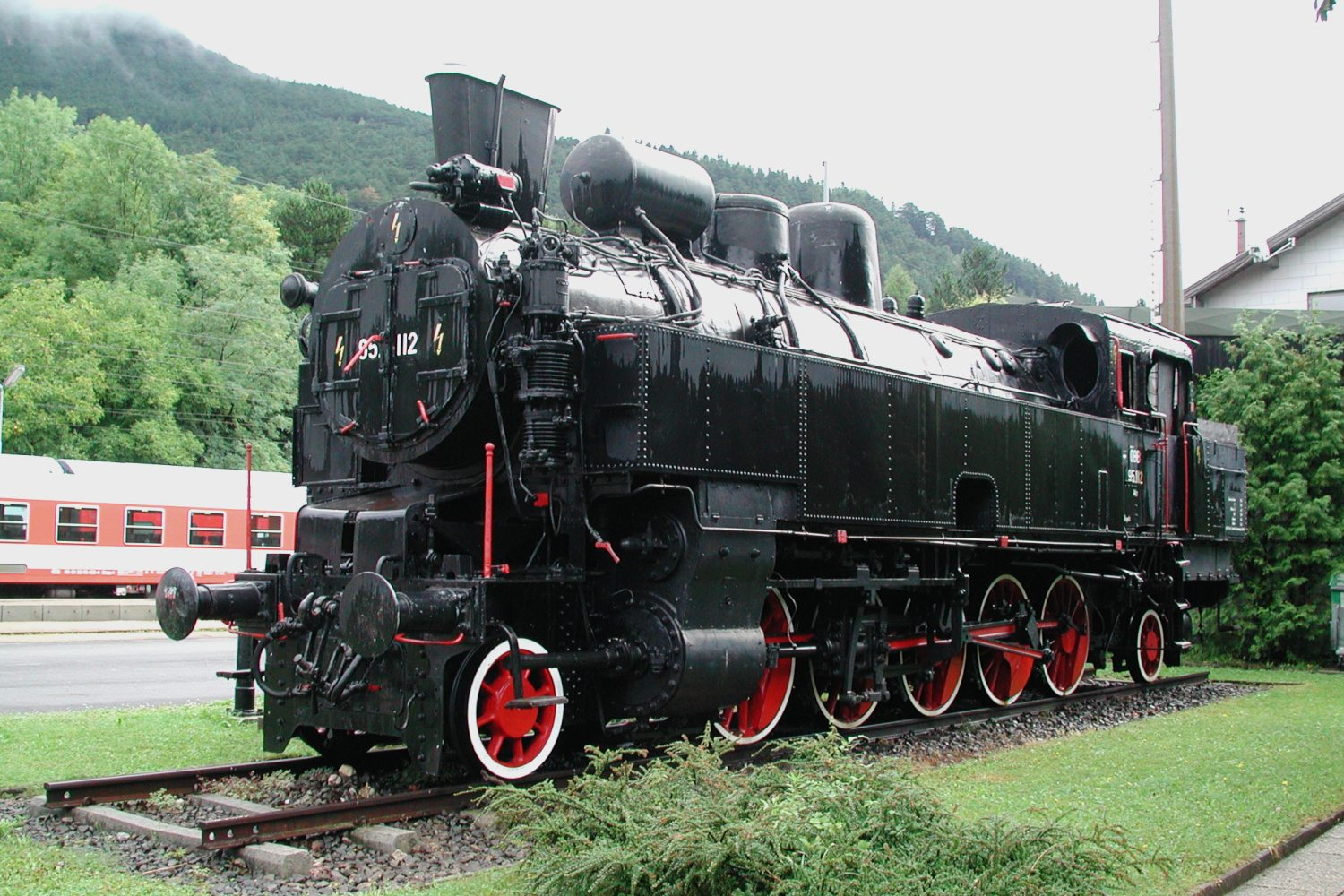
ÖBB class 95, former Südbahn class 82, at Payerbach-Reichenau station on the Semmering railway

== Innovations ==
Rihosek won special acclaim for his development of railway brakes, where he preferred the use of compressed air brakes. He carried out this work in conjunction with the firm of Gebrüder Hardy A.G., on whose board he sat until his death. In addition he invented the spark arrestor and the exhaust steam preheater.

== Publications ==
He published numerous articles in the magazines Organ für Fortschritte des Eisenbahnwesens, Zeitschrift des österreichischen Ingenieur- und Architektenverein, Die Lokomotive and Eisenbahn.

== Death ==
Rihosek died on 21 November 1956 in Vienna.

== See also ==
- List of railway pioneers

== Sources ==
- F. Scholz: Sektionschef Professor Dipl.-Ing. Dr. techn. h.c. Johann Rihosek †, In: Eisenbahn 1956/12, Zeitschriften-Verlag Ployer & Co., pp. 197–199, ISSN 0013-2756
- de:Johann Rihosek
