= Galician Railway of Archduke Charles Louis =

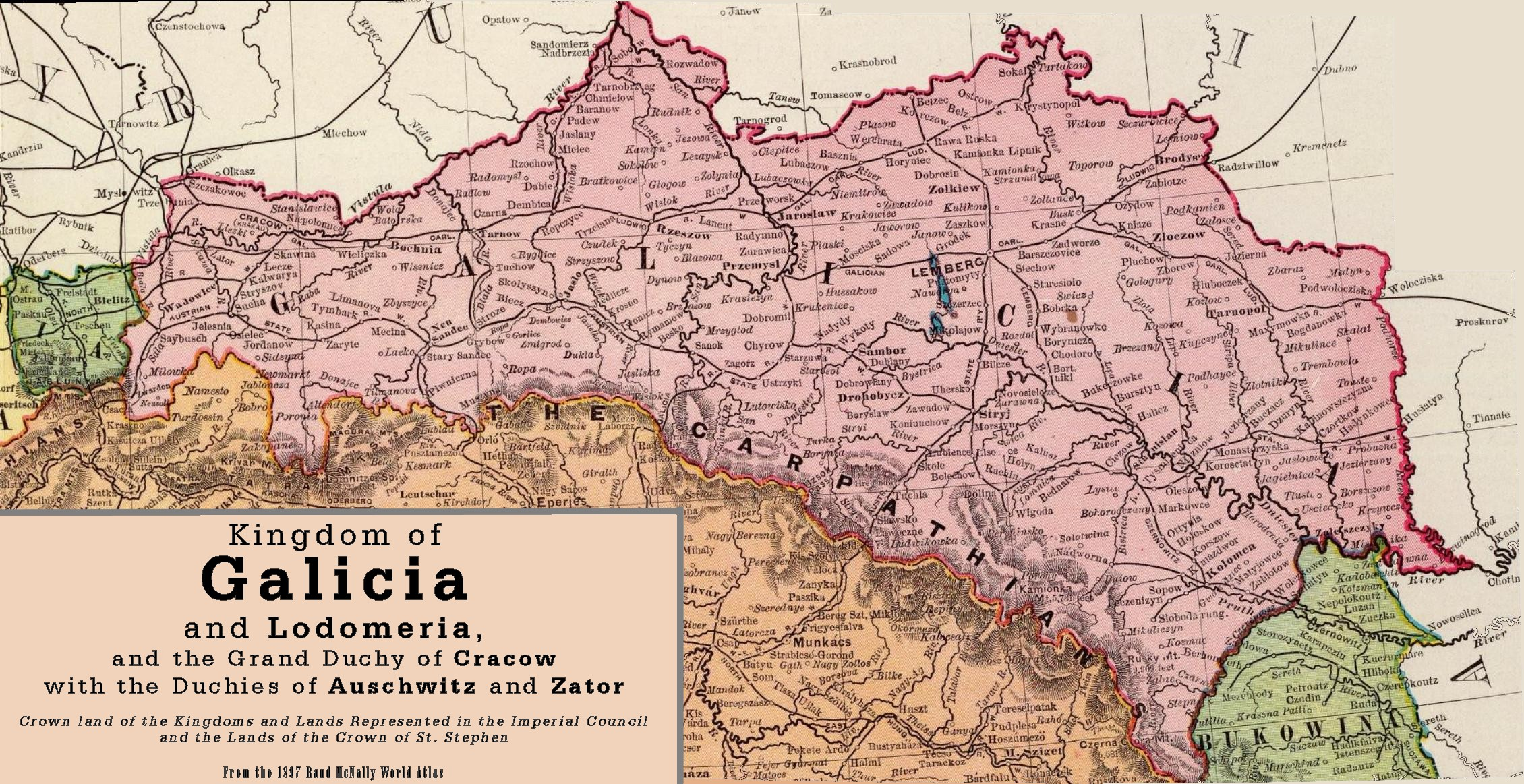
Railroad lines of Galicia before 1897

The Imperial and Royal privileged Galician Railway of Archduke Charles Louis (German: k.k.priv. Galizische Carl Ludwig-Bahn, Polish: c.k. uprzyw. Kolej Galicyjska im. Karola Ludwika) was a privately owned railway company in the Austro-Hungarian province of Galicia operating during the time of the partitions of Poland in the second half of the 19th century. The company was managed by Prince Leon Sapieha, under a license granted to him by Emperor Francis Joseph I on 7 April 1858. It was acquired by the Imperial Royal Austrian State Railways in 1892.

Once finished, the line crossed whole Galicia from west to east at the foothills of the Carpathian Mountains, connecting the main urban centers of the province - Kraków, Tarnów, Rzeszów, Przemyśl, Lwów (Lemberg) and Tarnopol. It started in Kraków and ended at the border rail station of Podwołoczyska (today Pidvolochysk), where it was connected over Zbruch with railroads of the Russian Empire at Wołoczyska (Volochysk). Apart from the main, west-east line, the company also built several branch lines of secondary importance.

The railway was named in honor of Archduke Charles Louis of Austria, younger brother of the Emperor (and father of the future crown prince Archduke Francis Ferdinand of Austria).

== History ==
=== 1858–1892 ===
The company was formed from the privatization of the Austrian Eastern National Railway, whose asset west of Kraków were transferred to the Emperor Ferdinand Northern Railway, while a 111 kilometer long line from Kraków to Dębica through Bochnia and Tarnów, along with a 5 kilometer branch line from Bieżanów (today a part of Kraków) to the salt mine in Wieliczka, was assigned to the newly created Galician Railway of Archduke Charles Luis.

In 1858 the company constructed another 5 kilometer branch line from Podłęże to Niepołomice and extended the main line 47 kilometers to Rzeszów. By 1859 the line was extended 37 kilometers to Przeworsk, 1860 - 50 kilometers to Przemyśl, and in 1861 reached the Galician capital of Lwów, another 100 kilometers east. By 1869 the line was extended 75 kilometers to Krasne and Złoczów, along with a 42 kilometers long branch from Krasne to Brody. In 1871 a 64 kilometers long segment was built to Tarnopol, followed by 53 kilometers to Podwołoczyska, on the border with the Russian controlled Podolia. In 1873 the branch to Brody was extended to Radziwiłłów in Russian controlled Volhynia.

By 1884 the company built a 150 kilometers long branch line from Jarosław to Sokal, and by 1887 a 110 kilometers long branch from Dębica through Sobów (today a part of Tarnobrzeg) forking to Rozwadów (today a part of Stalowa Wola) and Nadbrzezie (today in Sandomierz, which at the time was in Russian controlled Congress Poland), at the northern outskirts of Galicia, reaching a total length of 850 kilometers.

To the west, the Galician Railway of Archduke Charles Louis was connected with the rail systems of Bohemia and Austria at the junctions of Cieszyn and Bohumín. In 1866 the Lwów-Czerniowce-Jassy Railway connected Lwów with Czerniowce, the capital of the Duchy of Bukovina and a year later with Jassy, the capital of Principality of Moldova outside the Austro-Hungarian Empire. In 1873 the Railway of Archduke Albrecht connected Lwów with Stanisławów through Stryj and Dolina. In 1887 the Lwów–Bełżec (Tomaszów) Railway connected Lwów with Bełżec.

In 1872 the First Hungarian-Galician Railway connected Przemyśl with Sátoraljaújhely in the Kingdom of Hungary, creating a direct connection between Lwów and Budapest. In 1876 the Tarnów-Leluchów railway formed a second connection between Galicia and Hungary.

By the end of century the company had 175 steam engines, 345 passenger cars and 3755 freight cars. In 1892 the Galician Railway of Archduke Charles Louis was purchased by the Imperial Royal Austrian State Railways in accordance with the terms of the concession.

=== Legacy since 1892 ===
PKP railway line number 91

Today the Galician Railway of Archduke Charles Louis remains one of Poland's most important trunk lines. The line from Kraków to Medyka on the Polish-Ukrainian border is designated by the national railway infrastructure manager PKP Polskie Linie Kolejowe as Polish line number 91, the line has double tracks between Kraków and Przemyśl, is electrified along its entire length starting since the 1950 and finished in 1972.

After the soviet occupation of Eastern Galicia as a result of World War II the segment from Medyka to Lwów and beyond has been converted to Russian broad gauge along with almost all other lines in present-day Ukraine, and remains as such as of 2026. This greatly limits interoperability with the European rail network, despite many low key efforts to improve the situation since the collapse of the Soviet Union. Poland however maintains one of the tracks from Medyka to the main railway station in Przemyśl (pl:Przemyśl Główny) at Russian gauge, designated separately as line number 92, which allows Ukrainian trains to reach the city.

PKP railway line number 25

The branch line from Kraków to Wieliczka is designated as line nr 109, it has a single track electrified along its entire length, today the line is used exclusively by electric multiple units forming part of the Kraków public transport system. The branch to Niepołomice was designated as line nr 113, all traffic on the line was suspended in 2000 and in 2005 the track was dismantled and a local road was built in its place, as of 2022 the current government of Poland is considering the construction of a new railway line from Kraków to Niepołomice along a different trail. The branch from Dębica to Nadbrzezie was in 1915, following the Russian occupation of Galicia at the beginning of World War I, connected with a branch line of the Iwangorodzko-Dąbrowska Railway to Ostrowiec Świętokrzyski, constructed in Russian controlled Congress Poland in 1885, today along with a second branch of the same railway they form line nr 25 from Dębica to Łódź Kaliska. The segment from Sobów to Stalowa Wola is designated line nr 74. The branch Jarosław to Sokal is designated as line nr 101, diverting from the original route at Werchrata towards Hrebenne.

== See also ==
- Partition of Poland
- History of rail transport in Poland
- Imperial Royal Austrian State Railways
- Galician Transversal Railway
