= History of rail transport in Poland =

The history of rail transport in Poland dates back to the first half of the 19th century when railways were built under Prussian, Russian, and Austrian rule. "Divided Poland" in the 19th century was the territory of the former Polish–Lithuanian Commonwealth, and each ruling power administered transport in their sector. After the independence of the Second Polish Republic was declared on 11 November 1918, the Polish state administered its own railways until control was surrendered to German and Soviet occupiers during World War II.

During and after World War II major territorial changes were made again, with the Polish borders shifted westward in 1945, putting many German railways under Polish control and leaving several Polish ones in the East.

== 1835–1914 ==
=== Prussian heritage lines ===
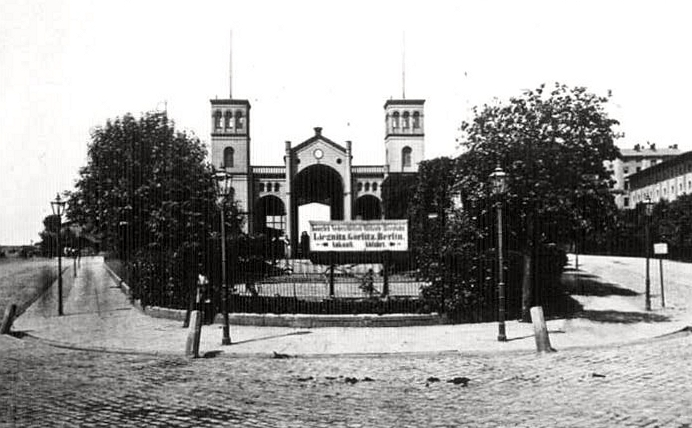
(Märkischer Bahnhof (Markish Station) in Breslau (Wrocław), about 1880

==== Upper Silesian Railway Company ====
In 1842, the Upper Silesian Railway Company, licensed since 1839, opened the first two sections of its main line: Breslau (Polish: Wrocław) to Ohlau (Polish: Oława) on 22 May and Ohlau (Polish: Oława) to Brieg (Polish: Brzeg) in August. These are the oldest railway sections of present Poland. Step by step the Upper Silesian Railway (Oberschlesische Eisenbahn, OSE) line was extended, in 1846 connecting Katowice. In 1847 Mysłowice at the border of Austrian Galicia was reached and the connection to Kraków and Upper Silesian Railway complete.

In 1856 the Upper Silesian Railway Company built a line from Breslau (Wrocław) to Posen (Polish: Poznań), and took over the administration of Stargard–Poznań Railway, in order to control the traffic between Silesia and the Port of Stettin (Polish: Szczecin).

Oberschlesische Schmalspurbahn (OSSB)
In 1851 inside its standard gauge main line, the Upper Silesian Railway Company started to build a narrow gauge network, connecting local mining trams. This Oberschlesische Schmalspurbahn (OSSB) survived the nationalization of the standard gauge lines, and in two steps 1920 and 1945 became present day Górnośląskie Koleje Wąskotorowe (GKW). It was extended to its top length of 233.5 km in 1965. A small remnant is still busy, offering a tourist passenger service.

==== Lower Silesian-Mark Railway ====
In 1843, the Lower Silesian-Mark Railway (German: Niederschlesisch-Märkische Eisenbahn-Gesellschaft, NME) opened its first section from Breslau (Polish: Wrocław) to Königszelt (Polish: Jaworzyna Śląska). In 1846 the line joining Breslau (Polish: Wrocław) to Berlin was completed.

==== William Railway ====
1846 to 1848 the William Railway (German: Wilhelmsbahn, Polish: Kolej Wilhelma) was built in Prussian Upper Silesia to link the Upper Silesian Railway (Polish: Kolej Górnośląska, German: Oberschlesische Eisenbahn) from Cosel (Polish: Koźle, now in Polish town Kędzierzyn-Koźle) to the Emperor Ferdinand Northern Railway (German: Kaiser Ferdinand Nordbahn, Czech: Severní dráha císaře Ferdinanda) in Austrian Silesia now Czech Silesia. The junction and terminus of both lines at the border was in Oderberg (Czech: Bohumín, Polish: Bogumin). The junction provided the communication between Berlin and Vienna as well as between Warsaw or Kraków and Vienna.

==== Silesian Mountain Railway ====
The Silesian Mountain Railway from Görlitz via Lauban (Polish: Lubań) and Hirschberg (Polish: Jelenia Góra) to Waldenburg (Polish: Wałbrzych) was opened in 1867 and extended to Glatz (Polish: Kłodzko) in 1880.

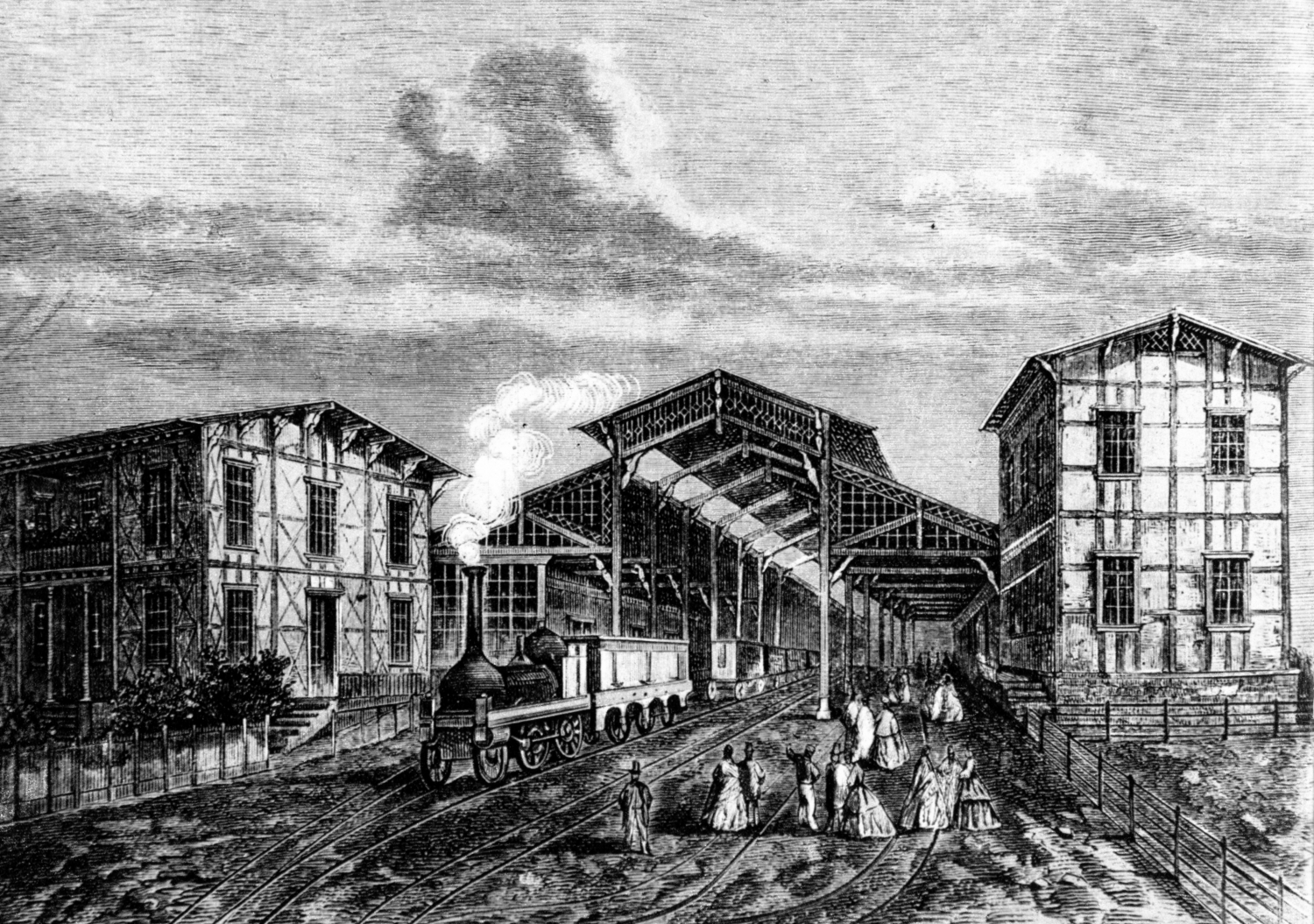
The station of Poznań in 1863

==== Stargard–Poznań Railway ====
Poznań was connected with Berlin via Stettin (Szczecin) in 1848 by erecting Stargard–Poznań Railway.

==== Prussian Eastern Railway ====
At the same, the Prussian Eastern Railway was planned from Berlin to Königsberg (present day Kaliningrad), passing through stations like Küstrin (Kostrzyn nad Odrą), Schneidemühl (Piła), Bromberg (Bydgoszcz) with a branch to Danzig (Gdańsk). The station of Kreuz (Krzyż) at the crossing point of Stettin–Poznań and Berlin–Königsberg had primarily been laid out for the latter to line be the trunk. Most parts of this main line were opened in 1852, but the construction of the bridges across Oder river at Küstrin (Kostrzyn) and Vistula and Nogat rivers between Dirschau (Tczew) and Marienburg (Malbork) was not completed before 1857.

In 1867, two other lines were opened: from Stettin/Szczecin to Danzig/Gdańsk via Stargard Szczeciński, Belgard (Białogard), Köslin (Koszalin) and Lauenburg in Pommern (Lębork); Frankfurt to Poznań via Reppen (Rzepin) and Bentschen (Zbąszyń).

==== Prussian state railways ====
In 1875 the Gründerzeit economic boom led to an economic crisis caused by the panic of 1873 and speculation in railway shares in Germany and Austria. The Chancellor of Germany, Otto von Bismarck, supported the elimination of speculation on railway joint-stock companies. He also supported the state's compulsory purchase of railways from private owners, as well as the introduction of an exclusive goods rate for the transport of agricultural products from Pomerania and East Prussia to Berlin.

Prussia nationalized its railways in 1880 in an effort both to lower rates on freight service and to equalize those rates among shippers. However, instead of lowering rates as far as possible, the government ran the railways as a profit-making undertaking, and the railway profits became a major source of state revenue. The nationalization of the railways slowed the economic development of Prussia because the state favoured the relatively backward agricultural areas in its railway building. Moreover, the railway surpluses substituted for the development of an adequate tax system.

In 1893, the Prussian state railways introduced the first modern fast trains (in German "D-Zug") using the new steam locomotive (S2/PKP class Pd1) which could reach a speed of 100 kilometres per hour (62 mph). The trains also included 4-axle bogie coaches with compartments and side corridor and covered gangways (Corridor trains). One such fast train route was that from Berlin to Bromberg and Danzig. In 1898, the first locomotive using superheated steam in the world, designed by Wilhelm Schmidt, was produced by the Vulkan company in Stettin for Prussian state railways (KPEV Hannover 74 S4). This opened a new age of steam locomotive development. Construction of the prototypes of superheated steam locomotive classes by Robert Garbe started in 1902. These were: S4 (PKP class Pd2) for fast trains, P6 (PKP class Oi1) per passenger trains and G8 (PKP class Tp3) for goods trains.

In the same year the Malborsko–Mławska Railway (the last large private railway under Prussian rule) was nationalized.

1906 saw the continued production of famous standard superheated steam locomotive classes by Garbe in the Linke-Hofmann locomotive factory in Breslau for the Prussian state railways. 584 of S6/PKP class Pd5 were produced, of which 82 units were operated by Polish State Railways (PKP). Approximately 4000 of P8/PKP class Ok1 were produced, of which 257 were operated by PKP before World War II, and 429 after the war. One of these, Ok1-359, is currently preserved in working order at the Wolsztyn museum.

==== Öls–Adelnau–Ostrów line ====
In 1910, the Öls–Adelnau–Ostrów line / Oleśnica–Odolanów–Ostrów Wielkopolski line that shortened the connection between Wrocław–Łódź and Warsaw was opened. Construction of the prototype of the long series 5-axle Prussian cargo locomotive G10 (PKP class Tw1) with exchange chamber with steam locomotive P8 (PKP class Ok1) by Garbe took place the same year. Three years later, production of cargo locomotive G8.1 of the Prussian state railways (PKP class Tp4) in the F. Schichau factory in Elbing commenced. Final production figures were 5267 items (459 items by PKP). That was the second longest locomotive series in Europe.

=== Warsaw–Vienna line ===
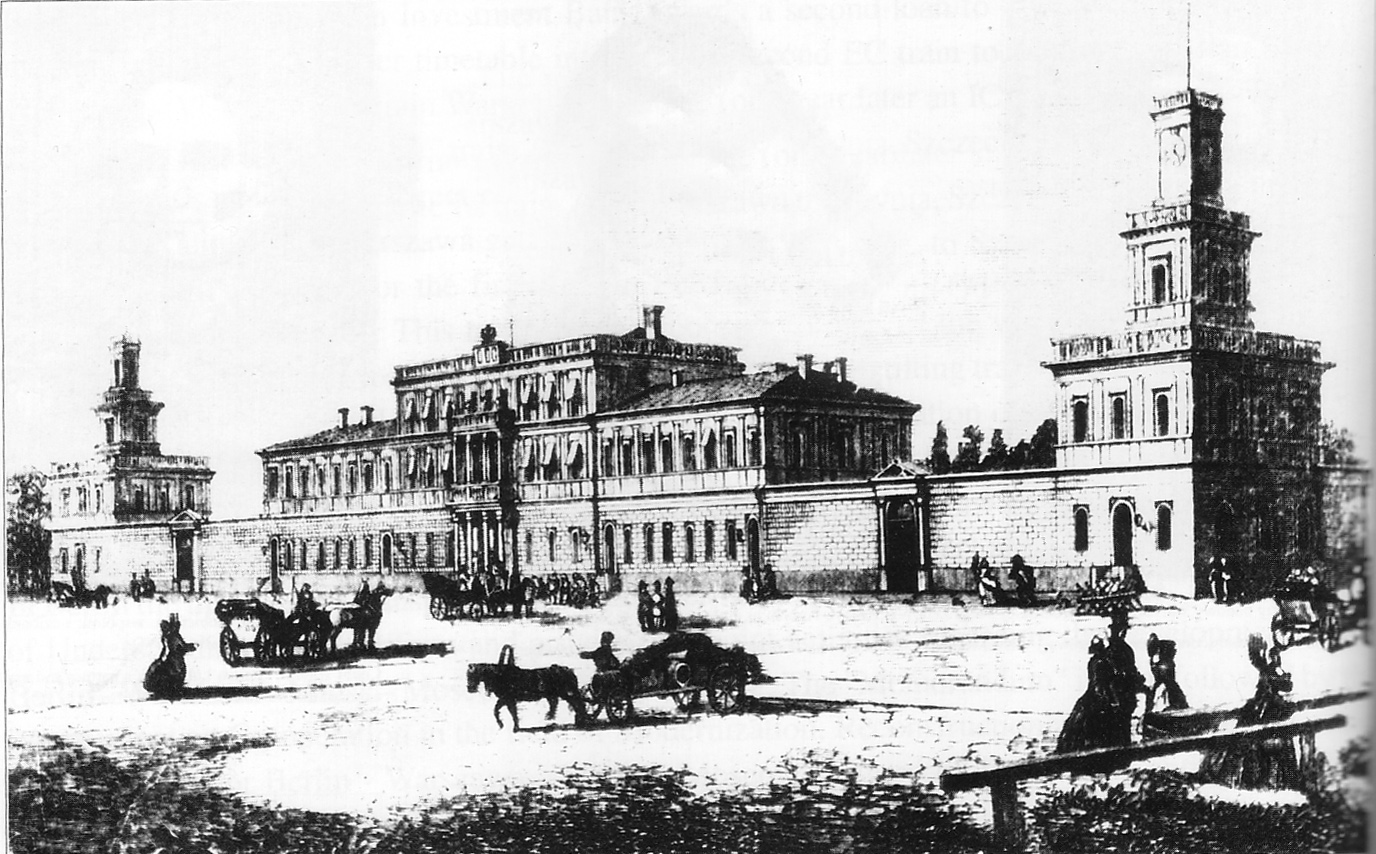
Vienna Station in Warsaw, about 1850

Borsig engine from the 1860es of Warsaw–Vienna line

In 1839, the Warsaw-Vienna Railway Company was founded as a joint stock company. In the same year it applied for a license to build the Warsaw–Vienna Railway line. Construction started in 1840, but in 1842 the company went bankrupt. The shares and property were taken over by the Government of Russian Poland in 1843 and construction continued. The first section (from Warsaw to Grodzisk Mazowiecki) was finished on 15 June 1845, and before December had reached Skierniewice. The whole line to Granica ("Border") station was completed in 1848, with a junction to Szczakowa station of Kraków and Upper Silesia Railway. In the same year, after the outbreak of the Spring of Nations, the first large international railway-military operation dispatched over 200,000 mounted Russian soldiers from Warsaw to Vienna and Budapest to help the Emperor of Austria put down the uprising. In 1859, the Government of Russia turned over the Warsaw–Vienna Railway to private owners. Opened in 1865/66, the new double track branch of Warsaw–Vienna Railway from Koluszki to Łódź Fabryczna was the most profitable railway in Congress Poland.

In 1894, the Warsaw–Vienna Railway ordered 13 fast steam locomotives with the Prussian S 2 design, and a series of modern 4-axle cars which covered transit routes from Schwartzkopff.

It was decided to nationalize the Warsaw and Vienna and Warsaw and Bydgoszcz Railways and the broad gauge track Kaliska Railway managed by this society. One year later, a decision was made to readjust the Warsaw and Vienna Railway to broad gauge track, but it was not realized.

In 1902, the Warsaw–Vienna Company built a wide gauge railway from Warsaw to Kalisz via Łowicz and Łódź (the Warsaw–Kalisz Railway), on a route different from the company's standard gauge line. At that time, Kalisz lay near the western border of Russian Empire. In 1906, it was joined to Nowe Skalmierzyce on the Prussian side of the border, providing a direct communication between Łódź and Lower Silesia.

=== Austrian heritage lines ===
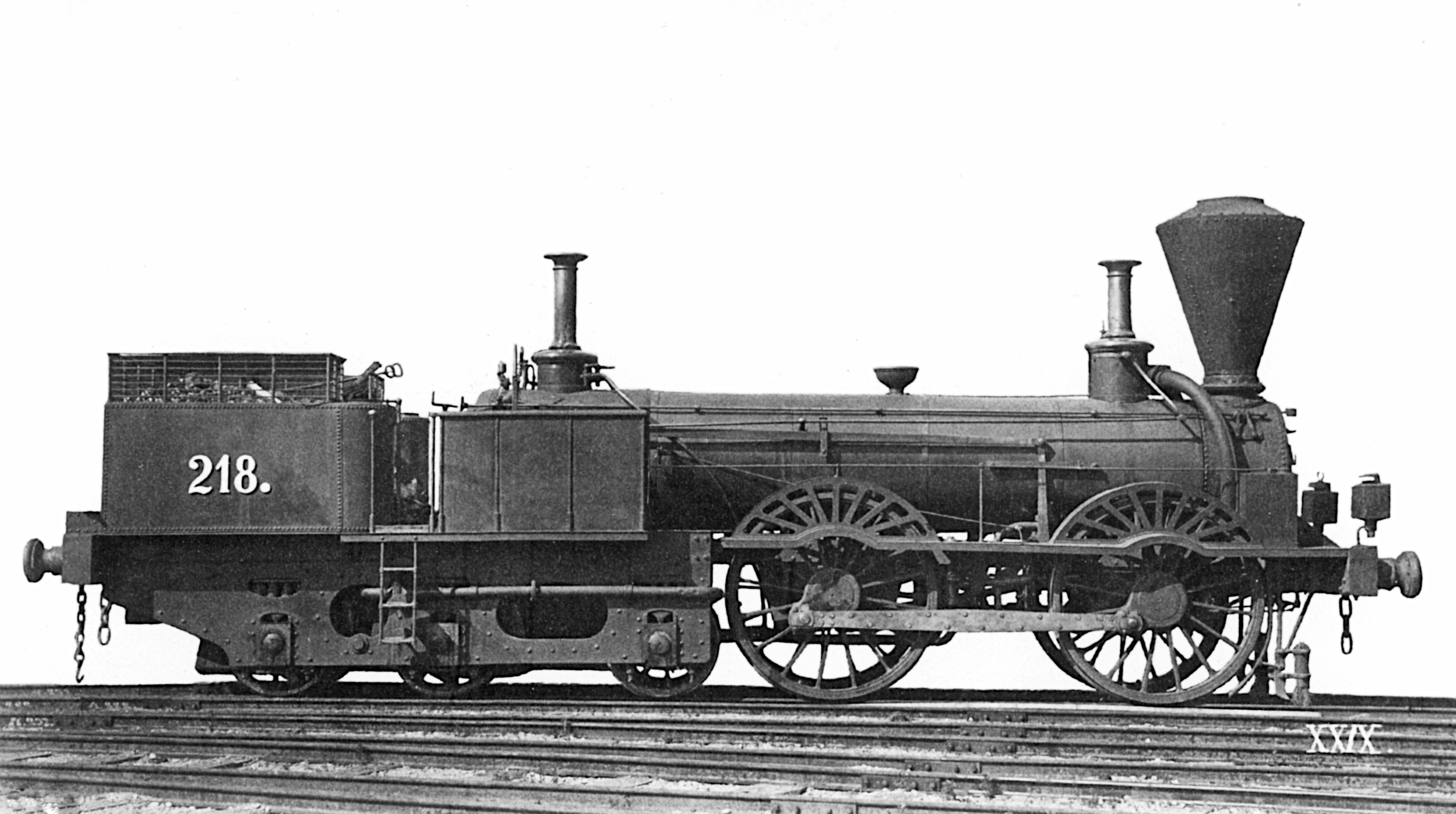
Austrian series from 1855/1856, as also running for ÖStB in Galicia

==== Kraków and Upper Silesian Railway ====
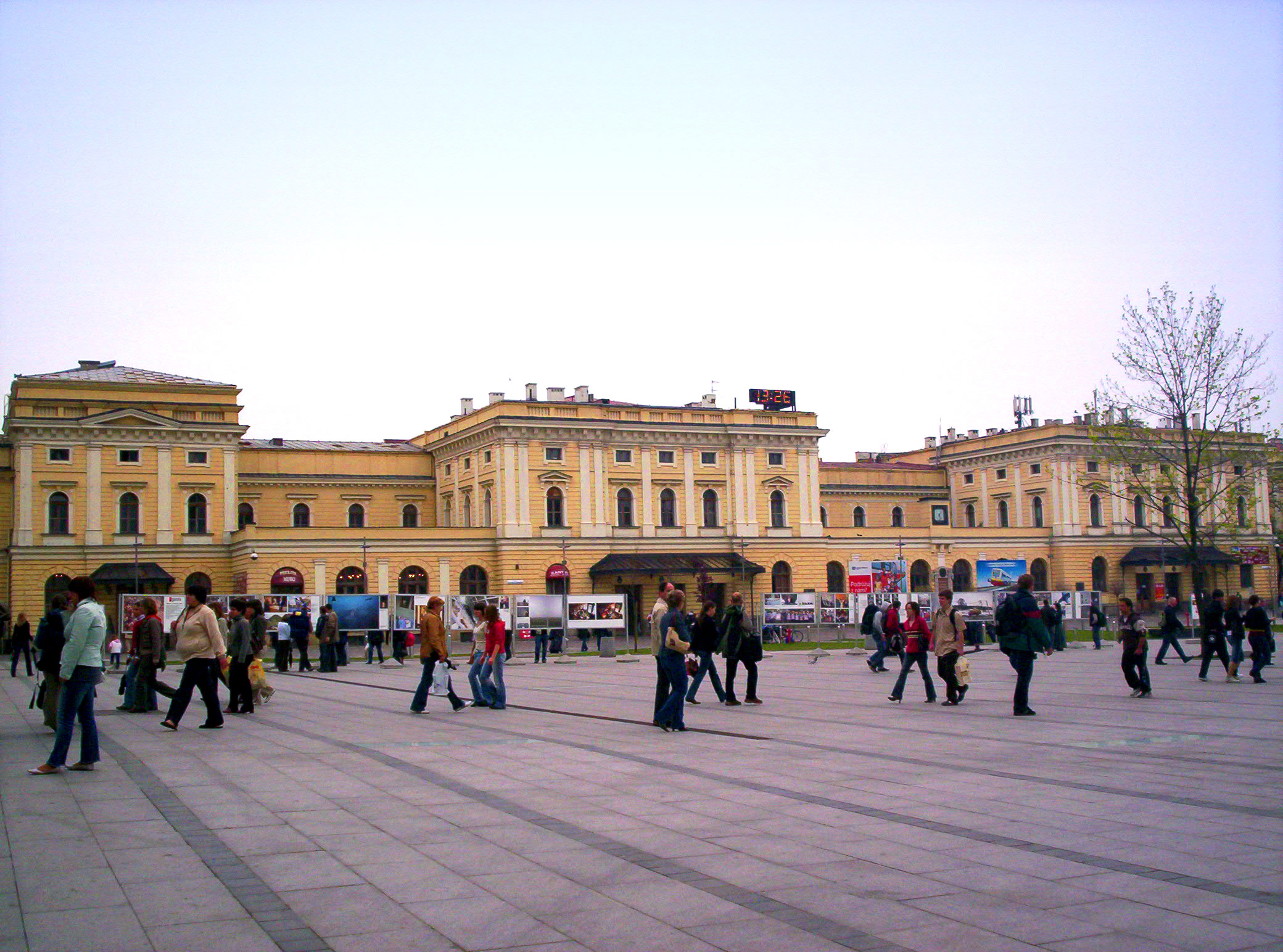
Kraków Main Station (Kraków Główny)

In 1847, the Kraków and Upper Silesian Railway (Kolej Krakowsko-Górnośląska), connecting Kraków to Mysłowice in Prussian Upper Silesia was completed. Owned by the City of Kraków, it was the first railway in the Austrian ruled part of Poland. It was linked to the Upper Silesian railway (Wrocław/Breslau to Upper Silesia) in the same year and to the Warsaw–Vienna Railway in 1848.

==== Emperor Ferdinand Northern Railway ====
Though in 1836 a licence had been issued to the Emperor Ferdinand Northern Railway to connect Vienna, Ostrava, Kraków and Bochnia, that railway was only built from Vienna to Bohumín on the Austrian and Prussian border, and the only rail communication form Vienna to Kraków used Prussian rails in upper Silesia until 1856.

==== Karol Ludvig Galician Railway ====
After some reorganizations, the Karol Ludvig Galician Railway (after intermediate Eastern National Railway ÖStB descendant of the Kraków and Upper Silesian Railway), step by step extended eastward, connected Kraków to Lwów (Lemberg, Lviv) in 1861.

=== Russian heritage lines ===
Broad gauge locomotive

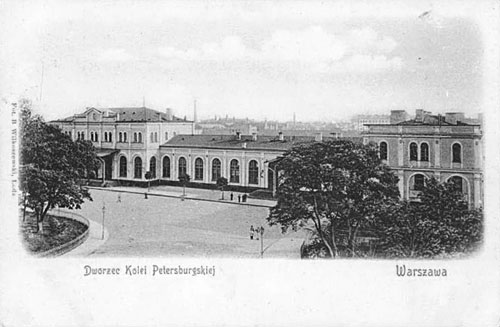
St. Petersburg Station in Warsaw, 1862–1915

The standard gauge Warsaw and Vienna Line had been the first long-distance railway under Russian rule at all.

==== Saint Petersburg–Warsaw Railway ====
Warsaw's first link to the 5 ft (1,524 mm) system was the Saint Petersburg–Warsaw Railway, completed in 1862. One year before, a branch of the line had reached the Russian and Prussian border with Verzhbolovo Station in Kybartai. This first junction of Russian wide gauge and Prussian standard gauge networks passed the northeastern corner of Russian Poland, which did not become part of Poland again after Polish revival.

==== Warsaw and Bydgoszcz Railway ====
Also in 1862, the last standard gauge main railway line in Russian Poland was opened between Łowicz (at a branch of the Warsaw and Vienna Line) to Aleksandrów Kujawski near the Prussian border. It was the Russian part of the Warsaw and Bydgoszcz Railway, the first direct connection between Warsaw and the Prussian ruled parts of old Poland.

==== Warsaw-Terespol Railway ====
In 1866, the direct railway form Moscow to Warsaw via Brest was finished.

==== Iwanogrodzko–Dąbrowska Railway ====
Later, another wide gauge railway track was added: the Iwanogrodzko–Dąbrowska Railway from Dęblin via Radom–Bzin (now Skarżysko-Kamienna)–Kielce–Tunnel to Dąbrowa (now Dąbrowa Górnicza Strzemieszyce) and from Ostrowiec Świętokrzyski to Łódź via Bzin–Tomaszów Mazowiecki–Koluszki. This caused a temporary decrease of cargo transport (mainly coal) on the Warsaw–Vienna Railway. The Russian General Staff confirmed the exclusive production of wide gauge equipment in the territory of Russia.

==== Wrocław–Warsaw Railway ====
The Russian authorities refused extension of the Wrocław–Warsaw Railway (Oleśnica–Podzamcze) to Łódź and Warsaw on their territory.

Warszawa Praga railway station built around 1877 (no longer existing)

The Engineering Railway School in Warsaw was opened under the line's protection in 1873.

==== Ring Railway (Kolej Obwodowa) ====
In 1875, Warsaw's first railway bridge across Vistula river was opened (Gdański Bridge – former Ring Railway Bridge), connecting the wide gauge lines east of the river to the standard gauge lines starting from Vienna Station in the west. Ring Railway (Kolej Obwodowa), in 1876, connected the Warsaw-Vienna and Warsaw-Terespol Railways

==== Other ====
In 1888, all railroads in Russia were nationalized.

The revolution of 1905 in Russia and Congress Poland led to the disorder of the rail traffic on many important routes and many important junctions.

However, after the revolutionary events, the traffic was restored and many new technical improvements were implemented, especially for military sake.

== World War I ==
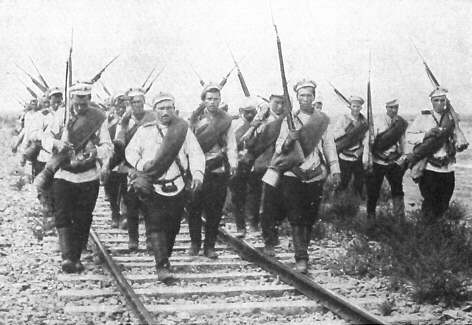
Russian infantry marching along railway lines

Soon after occupying Polish areas, the German railway army readjusted the railway from Russian (broad gauge) to 1,435 mm (4 ft 8 1/2 in) standard gauge. On the Russian side, most of the rolling stock of the Warsaw–Vienna Rail, Warsaw–Bydgoszcz and Kaliska Rail (as well as the headquarters of these lines) was relocated by the retreating Russian army. In its retreat the Tsar's army also destroyed the central locomotive hall of Russian-Polish standard gauge railways in Łowicz and Saint Petersburg Station in Warsaw. In response to a counter-attack by the Russian army, German General Ludendorff ordered the destruction of strategic parts of the Warsaw–Vienna line and the Kalisz Railway between Warsaw, Łódź, Kutno and Kalisz.

In 1915, the German and Austrian armies completed adapting a significant portion of all broad gauge track to standard gauge. As the railway bridge over the Vistula River had been damaged, the Germans used ferries to move locomotives across the river in Warsaw. The same year saw construction of military railways on the Wielbork–Ostrołęka and Rozwadów–Sandomierz routes, as well as additional lines on the Kalisz Railway. Modern German railway rolling stock replaced the broad gauge stock which had been removed to Russia.

== 1918–1939 ==
On 3 January 1918, the Regency Council transferred the management of the state railway in the former Congress Poland to the Ministry of Business and Industry. In fact, the management belonged to Militäreisenbahn-Generaldirektion Warschau (MGD). In October of the same year, the Regency Council brought into being the Ministry of Communication.

On 31 October 1918, Polish railwaymen took over the Railway Directorate in Kraków and railways in Galicia and Śląsk Cieszyński, beginning the takeover of railways in the former Russian and Austrian sectors. Polish railwaymen took over the management of railways in the Warsaw district on the same day.

=== Independent Poland railways ===
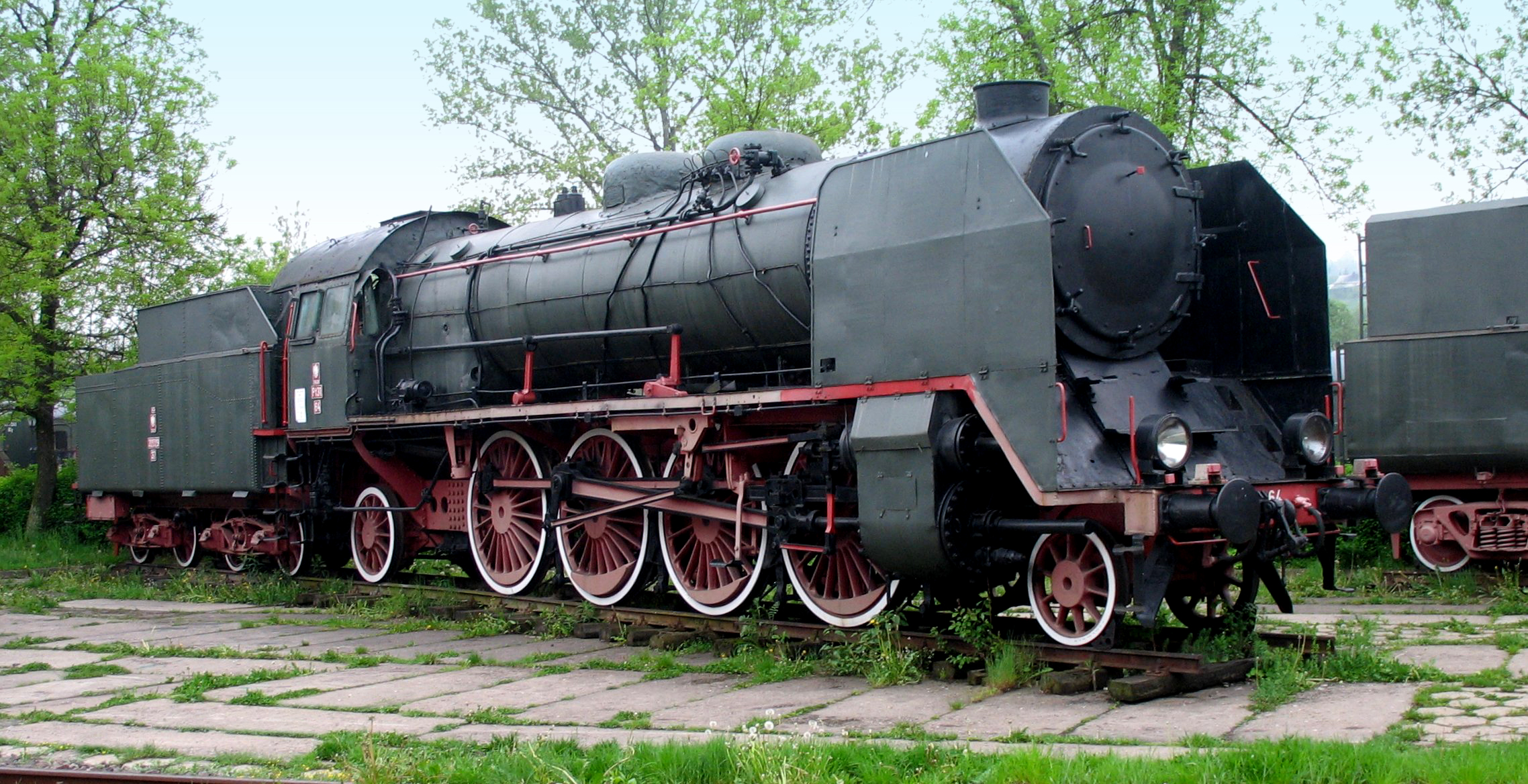
PKP Pt31 series (1932–1940)

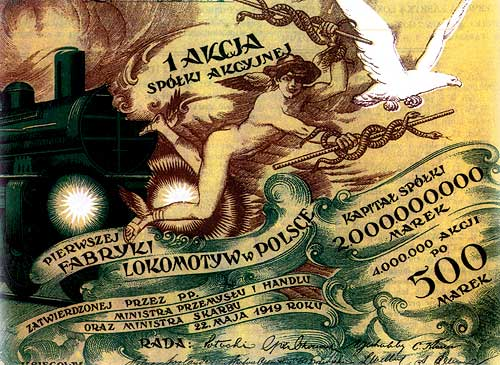
One share of Polish First Locomotive Factory in Chrzanów

Gaining independence on 11 November 1918 allowed Poland to reclaim the former Russian and Austrian sectors from military railways. The Railway Department in the Ministry of Communication was created and the Polish railways were officially named Polskie Koleje Państwowe.

In December 1918, the Great Poland Uprising started. The rebels took over the former Prussian sector of railways. One year later, the fights for Lwów were over and the former Austrian railway directorate was taken over by Poland and their left-hand traffic infrastructure was reconstructed. Taking over the railways from Prussians lasted until 1921.

In 1919, Stanislaw Rodowicz, Eng. developed the first draft of the containerization system in Poland. In 1920 he built the prototype of the biaxial wagon. The Polish-Bolshevik War halted the development of the container system in Poland.

After the victory over the Red Army in the Polish-Bolshevik War (1920), a great deal of damage in railway structure was discovered on the route along which the communists were retreating. At the same time, the tense relations with Lithuania led the railways around Wilno and Minsk to a partial disintegration and stagnation. The Libau–Romny Railway was not recovered.

Polish railways administration finally took over the railways in Upper Silesia in 1922. That same year, a decision was made to divide railways in Poland into nine administrative districts.

An economic crisis in 1930s forced the state to cut back its budget for railway investment. Profit decreased by 50% compared to 1929. The next year, over 23,000 PKP employees had been dismissed and protests and strikes causes authorities to try to find a solution. The end of the crisis and an increase of cargo transport and income came in 1937.

=== Motive Power ===
The government of Paderewski purchased 150 steam locomotives type Consolidation from the United States in 1919. The same year French authorities offered one hundred captured German steam locomotives and two thousand cargo vehicles. Twenty-five items of PKP class Tr20 locomotives were ordered from the US in 1920.

The Poles fought to get compensation for railway rolling stock from the defeated Central Powers, mainly Germany, in accordance with Article 371 of the Versailles Treaty, and the Treaties of Saint Germain (from Austria) and the Trianon (from Hungary) took almost three years (1921–1923). They received around 2,900 steam locomotives from the former German railways and over 1,300 from the Austrian railways.

In 1921, the first orders for steam locomotives for PKP from German factories (PKP class Ok1, PKP class Tp4 and PKP class Tw1) and Austrian (PKP class Tr12, PKP class Okm11). A reconstruction of Austrian steam locomotives PKP class Tr12 from spare parts in Warsaw Steam Locomotive Company Ltd. started as well.

In 1923, construction of the First Locomotive Factory in Chrzanów, Poland started. The same year, local production began in the Warszawa Steam Locomotive Joint Stock Company. The first Polish steam locomotives in Germany and Belgium (PKP class Tr21, PKP class Ok22, PKP class Ty23) were ordered. A year after, steam locomotive production in H. Cegielski factory in Poznań began. The State's financial problems stopped orders for rolling stock abroad. After 1933, PKP had to deal with competition by "wild" carters and raftsmen, offering horse and river transport for distances over 150 kilometres (93 mi) at lower prices than the railway.

From 1936, the Factory in Chrzanów worked at its own cost (without PKP orders) on fast steam locomotive PKP class Pm36 in two versions. Engineer K. Zembrzuski was the contractor of this locomotive. In 1937, the prototype Pm36-1 with aerodynamic lagging won the gold medal on the world exhibition in Paris. The speed test of Pm36 on the back way from Paris reached over 150 kilometres per hour (93 mph) on German rails.

=== New railway lines ===
Opening of Warsaw–Radom connection

In 1920, a decision was made to construct of new railway line urgently: Łódź–Kutno–Płock–Sierpc–Nasielsk, Kutno–Strzałkowo, and gaps in lines, bypassing the connections broken by the new border with Germany and Gdańsk.

A year later, construction began on the Kutno–Konin–Strzałkowo railway, to shorten connections between Warsaw and Poznań. In 1922, construction of the Kutno–Płock and Swarzewo–Hel lines started.

In 1924, the Nasielsk–Sierpc line and construction of a new port station and railway junction in Gdynia opened. A Customs War with Germany started in 1925, causing a rush to build a port in Gdynia and a detour line from Silesia to the coast by-passing German territory.

In 1927, the first Polish electric railway was built: the private EKD Warsaw–Podkowa Leśna–Grodzisk/Milanówek with branches to Włochy near Warsaw. The French-Polish Rail Association finished construction of the Polish Coal Trunk Line between Bydgoszcz and Gdynia in 1933. In 1934, the beginning of the use of a new railway line, Warsaw–Radom, opening the new connection from Warsaw to Kraków, and preparation to electrification works on Warsaw railway junction and suburbs took place.

In 1936 the first electric line based on 3,000 V DC from Warsaw to Otwock and Pruszków opened.

== World War II ==
German panzer train

On 1 September 1939, railwaymen of Szymankowo stopped a German armoured train before its arrival on the bridge over the Vistula River and blew up the bridge. After the Soviet invasion of eastern Poland on 17 September 1939, most Polish rolling stock fell into Soviet hands.

The Polish railways in Silesia, Greater Poland and Pomerania were adopted by German railways Deutsche Reichsbahn on 25 September.

Until the last moment before the German attack on the Soviet Union on 22 June 1941, cargo trains transported goods from the Soviet Union to Germany. Early German attacks on the Soviet Union resulted in Ostbahn possessing railway and rolling stock of PKP with broad gauge track. They began reconstruction to standard gauge. Organized sabotage of railways by the Polish resistance movement in World War II began about the same time.

In 1942, global production of simple military steam locomotives, DR Kriegslok BR52 (PKP class Ty2), in Poznań and Chrzanów, and of steam boilers for these locomotives started in Sosnowiec. In 1944, production of the first steam locomotive BR52 in Chrzanów started.

The Warsaw Uprising caused widespread damage of Warsaw rolling stock, network and electric traction; both bridges over the Vistula River and the tunnel on the Warsaw Cross-City Line were destroyed. The unfinished Warszawa Główna railway station was partially destroyed several times 1939-1941 and finally blown up by the Germans.

== Communist period ==
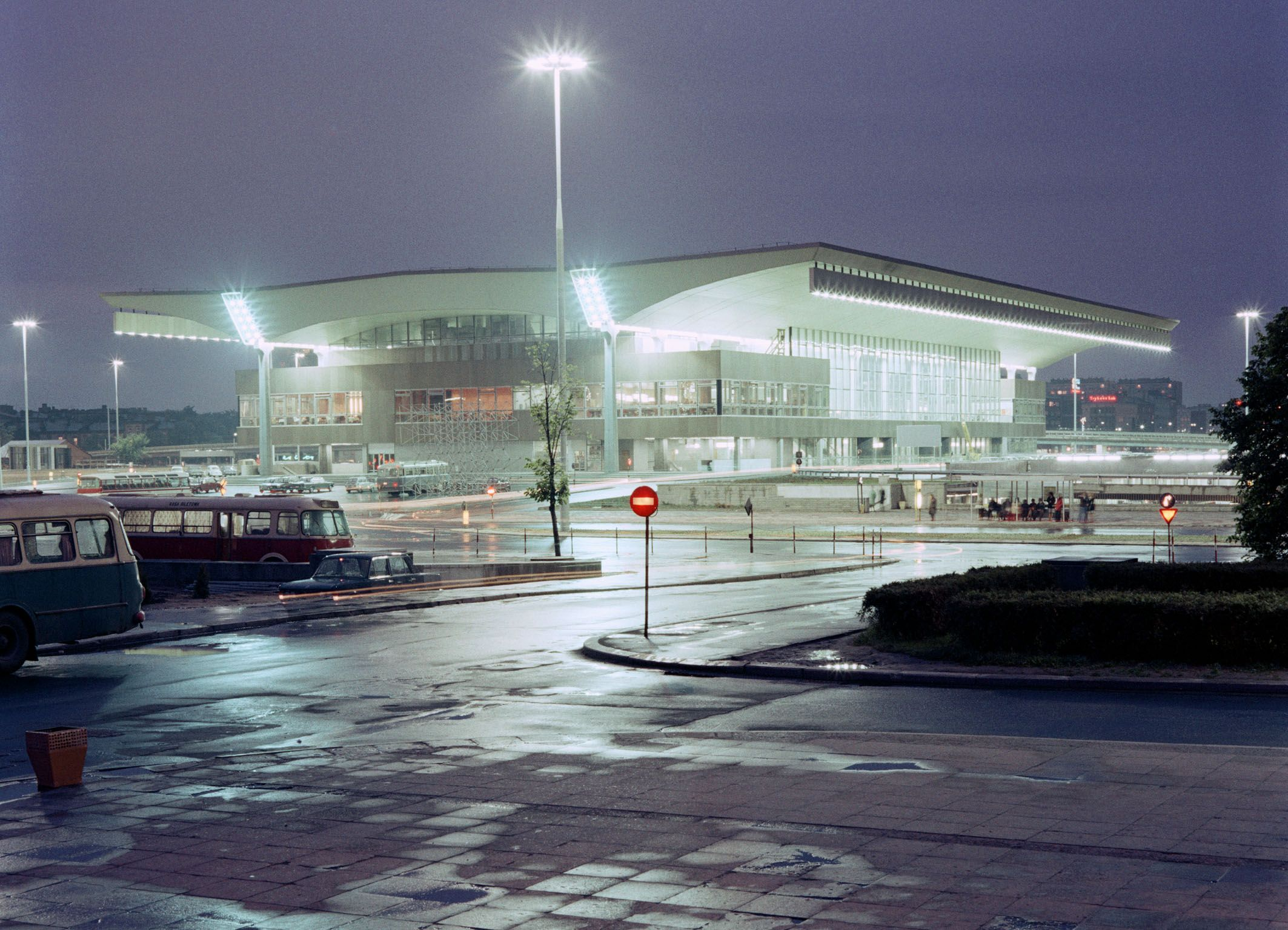
Warszawa Centralna railway station in Poland (1975)

At the beginning of 1945, the Ministry of Transport was created, as well as the Regional Directorate of National Railways. Many pre-war locomotives were sent to the Soviet Union. Poland received many German locomotives as a compensation for war losses. In June, the rail connection with Warsaw was opened, using a temporary railway station made of warehouses. On 15 September 1945, PKP took over management of all railway lines on new Polish territory from the Soviet Union. Most of these lines were either destroyed or inaccessible. The railways in the country were divided into 10 districts.

In 1946, the Fablok and Cegielski factories started the production of PKP class Pt47 (pre-war PKP class Pt31) and PKP class Ty45 (pre-war PKP class Ty37) locomotives. Meanwhile, the production of PKP class Ty42 (German BR52) was in process and Poznań prepared to start the production of PKP class Ty43 (German BR42) which had been produced in Szczecin previously. The situation in the Polish railways was disastrous, so the government decided to buy 75 USATC S160 (Polish PKP class Tr201) American locomotives (on UNRRA basis), 30 British 9F (Polish PKP class Tr202) locomotives, and 500 S160 Polish PKP class Tr203) locomotives, what was left from American army in Europe. Another 100 locomotives ordered from the US (Decapol – Polish PKP class Ty246) were sent to service Śląsk–Gdynia line. In the same year, electric trains started an operating line from Warsaw to Otwock.

Polish railways regained pre-war locomotives from Hungary, Czechoslovakia and Yugoslavia (in 1947), yet units from the eastern parts of Poland were taken over by USSR and rebuilt to operate on a wide gauge. Two years after the war's end, the first passenger cars are built in Cegielski (Poznań) and PaFaWag (Wrocław), while freight cars were being built in Chrzanów and Zielona Góra. At the same time, Warsaw railway lines were rebuilt together with the tunnel under the country's capital. As a part of the Ministry of Communication, the Bureau for Railway Electrification was founded. The first projects were to rebuild all lines that had been electrified before the war, and then the Warsaw–Żyrardów–Skierniewice–Koluszki and the Warsaw–Sochaczew lines would be electrified. The electrification was planned to bring 3000V AC into Polish railways.

The modernised version of PKP class Pt31 locomotive started in 1948, the locomotive gaining a new name, Pt47. Reconstruction of German S-Bahn EMUs started the same year, which required building overhead lines in the Tricity area. Those EMUs were renamed EW90, 91 and 92 and soon after (in 1951) started operating on SKM lines. In 1949 the construction of Tomaszów Mazowiecki–Radom line was completed.

The 1950s in Polish railways were a time of serious development and improvements. In 1950, construction of TKt48 locomotives started and two years later a prototype of the Ol49 steam locomotive was built. 1953 brought several new types of electric rolling stock into PKP. Ten units of EP03 electric locomotives and 40 units of EW54 EMUs were ordered from Sweden. EW54 EMUs were sent to operate on lines connecting Warsaw with Mińsk Mazowiecki, Żyrardów and Sochaczew. Meanwhile, EP04 and EU20 locomotives were ordered from the DDR, along with EN56 and ED70 EMUs.

Polish production in that period included PKP class EW53 EMU and PKP class EP02 locomotive. In 1954 the prototype of the last heavy freight steam engine – PKP class Ty51 – was built. New lines opened that year are Skierniewice–Łuków line and Sitkówka–Busko Zdrój line.

Przemyśl-Zagórz trains travelled through the Soviet Union without stops.

High speed Central Rail Line (designed in 1977 for speed equal 250 km/h) and Broad Gauge Metallurgy Line (1979) were constructed. The highest speed reached by railway in Poland during the communist period was 160 km/h in 1987 as a regularly scheduled operation from Warsaw to Kraków. It was premiere of the newest Polish electric locomotive EP09.

== Present-day Poland ==
On 14 December 2014 PKP Intercity Pendolino trains under the name 'Express Intercity Premium' began operating on the CMK line (224 km line from Kraków and Katowice to Warsaw) with trains reaching 200 km/h (124 mph) as a regularly scheduled operation. There is a plan by PKP PLK to increase speed to 250 km/h on whole line soon.

The "Y" High-speed rail in Poland construction has been cancelled. The old building of the Łódź Fabryczna railway station has been removed and an underground station is being constructed. New railway is being constructed in Tricity.

Steam trains still do regular runs from Wolsztyn, the last place in Europe where they are in regular commercial service.

== Rail history of Warsaw ==
The first railway opened in Warsaw in 1845 (the Warsaw-Vienna Railway). In the next years, the following railways were opened:

- Warsaw-Saint Petersburg, in 1862, through Białystok and Vilnius – broad gauge railway,
- Warsaw-Moscow, in 1867 – through Terespol, thus called "Warsaw-Terespol Railway" – broad gauge,
- Ring Railway (Kolej Obwodowa), in 1876, connected the Warsaw-Vienna and Warsaw-Terespol Railways,
- Vistula Riverside Railway (Kolej Nadwiślańska), in 1877 - Mława-Warsaw-Lublin-Kovel – broad gauge,
- Warsaw-Kalisz, in 1902 – Warsaw-Sochaczew-Łódź-Kalisz - broad gauge railway.

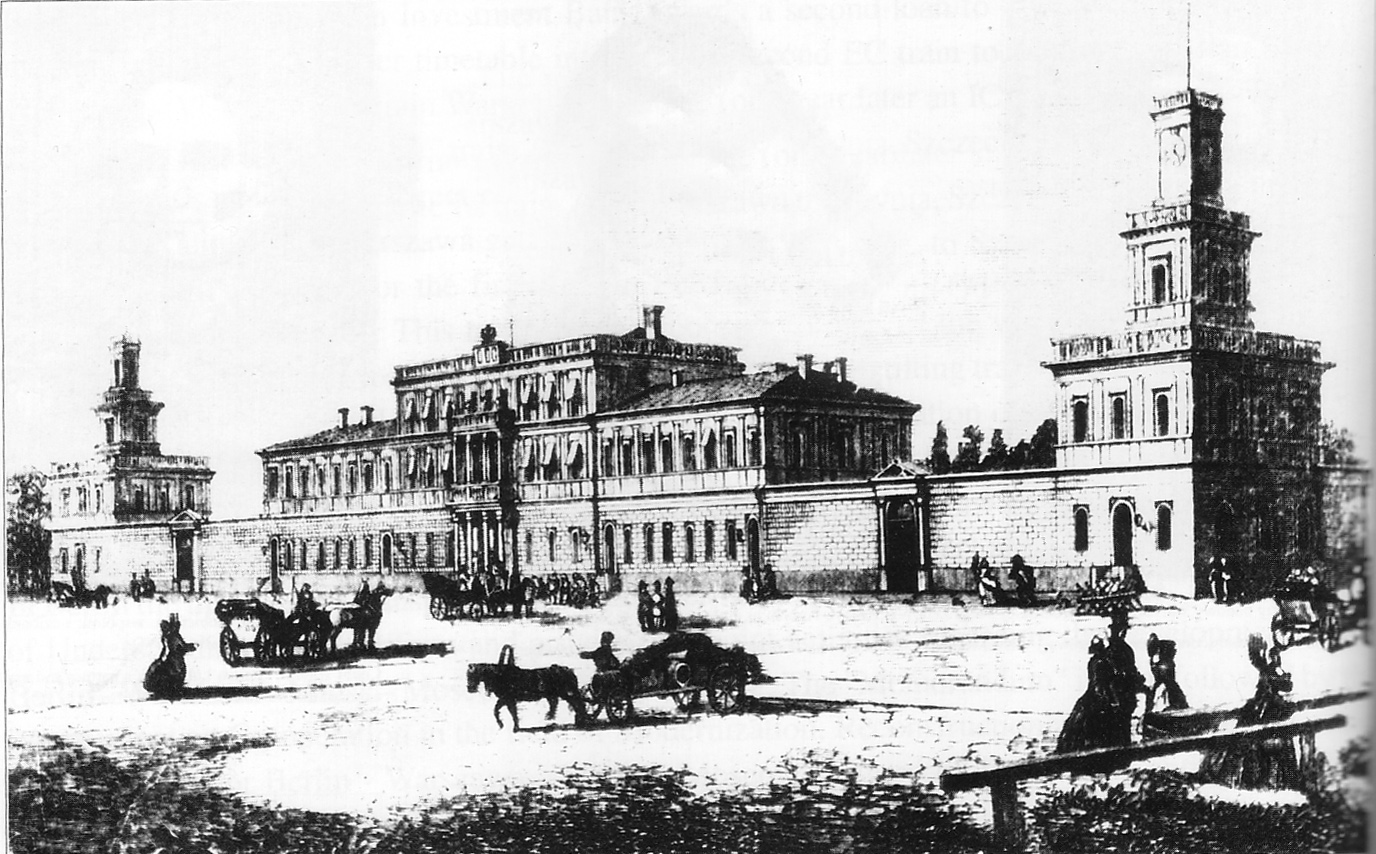
Vienna railway station, c. 1850

On these railways the following stations were built: Vienna St. (Dworzec Warszawsko-Wiedeński, 1845), Saint Petersburg St. (Dworzec Petersburski, 1863), Terespol St. (Dworzec Terespolski), Vistula St. (Dworzec Nadwiślański, 1878), Kalisz St. (Dworzec Kaliski, 1902). The Vienna St. and Terespolski St. survived World War I, the other stations were pulled down by Russians in 1915, but only the Kaliski St. was not rebuilt after the war. During the war and after it, the broad gauge railways were converted to standard gauge. But right up until 1933, the only line connecting both Vistula banks was the Ring Railway, with the bridge near today's Gdański Bridge. In 1933, the connection between the Main Station (former Vienna St.) and the Terespol St. was built: as it ran through the densely built-up city center, it was built in a tunnel. This tunnel along with a bridge is called Średnicowy (Cross-City Tunnel) and has approximately 2.3 kilometres (1.4 mi). Year 1934 saw the opening of the railway to Radom and further to Kraków.

There are two railway bridges in Warsaw:

- along the Gdański bridge – former Ring Railway Bridge (1875), serves mainly freight trains and some of passenger trains,
- Średnicowy (1933) – serves mainly passenger trains.

== See also ==
This article is part of the History of rail transport by country series.

- Polish State Railways
- PKP Group
- Railway stations in Poland
- Polish locomotives designation
- Polish National Railroads Summer 1939
- Polish rail border crossings
