= KFNB Nordstern =

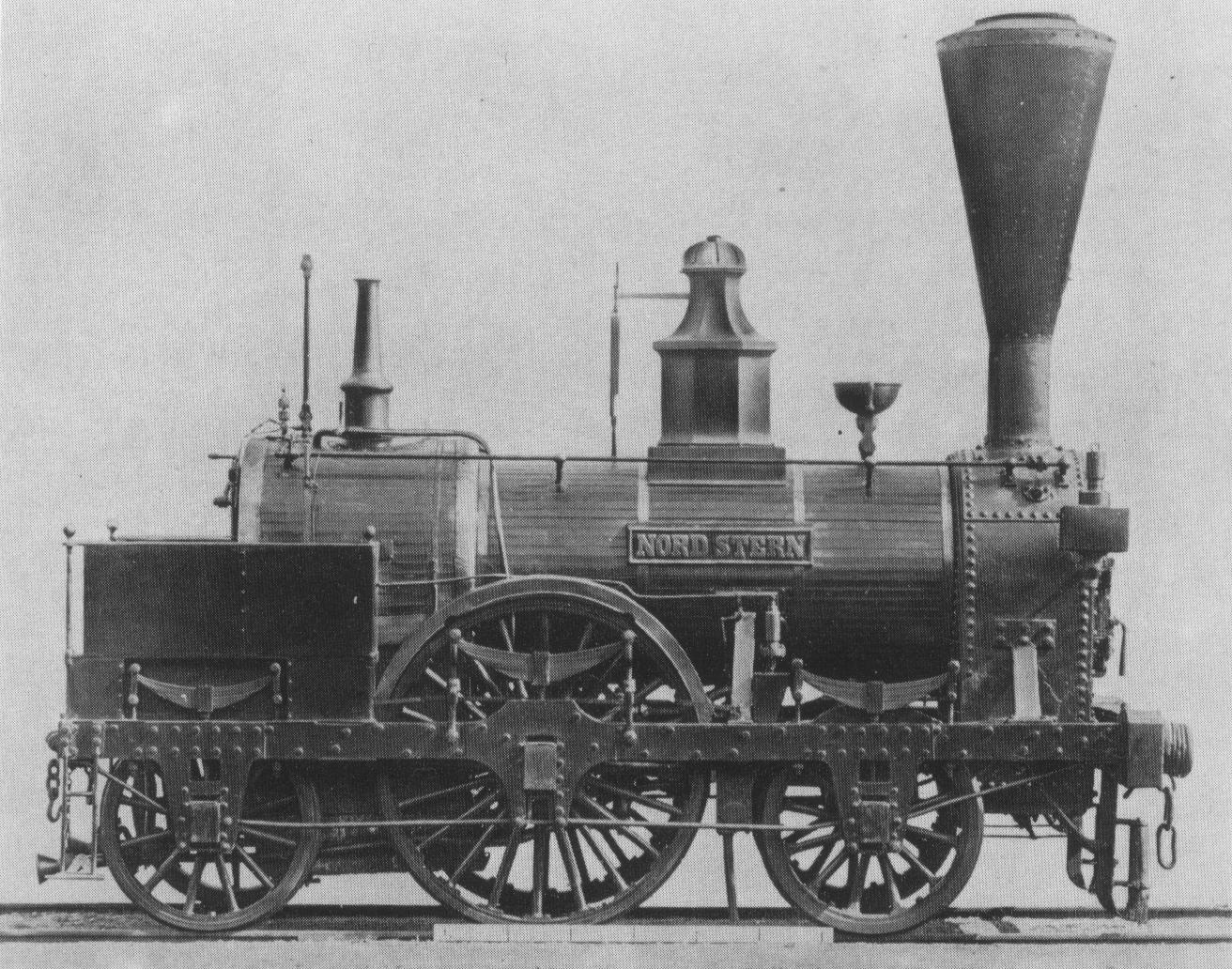
Type and origin
- Power type: Steam
- Builder: J. and G. Rennie
- Build date: 1839
- Total produced: 1
- Rebuild date: 1843
Specifications
- Configuration
  - Whyte: 2-2-2
  - UIC: 1A1
- Driver: 2nd axle
- Leading dia.: 1,054 mm (3 ft 5 1/2 in)
- Driver dia.: 1,818 mm (5 ft 11 5/8 in)
- Trailing dia.: 1,054 mm (3 ft 5 1/2 in)
- Wheelbase: 3,372 mm (11 ft 3/4 in)
- Length
  - Over beams: 5,795 mm (19 ft 1/4 in)
- Loco weight: 13.2 tonnes (13.0 long tons; 14.6 short tons); Service: 14.5 tonnes (14.3 long tons; 16.0 short tons)
- Firebox
  - Type
  - Grate area: 0.88 m^{2} (9.5 sq ft)
- Boiler pressure: 6.5 bar (650 kPa; 94.3 psi)
- Heating surface
  - Firebox: 3.10 m^{2} (33.4 sq ft)
  - Tubes: 48.1 m^{2} (518 sq ft)
  - Total surface
- Cylinders: Two, inside
- Cylinder size: 351 mm (13 13/16 in)
Career
- First run: 1839
- Scrapped: 1865

KNFB Nordstern was one of the first passenger steam locomotives in the Austrian Empire. It was built by J. and G. Rennie Locomotive Works for the Emperor Ferdinand Northern Railway (German: Kaiser Ferdinands-Nordbahn or KFNB) in 1839 and operated from Vienna to Břeclav. Nordstern was the only locomotive of its type supplied to the KFNB and corresponded to standard English designs of the period with a 2–2–2 wheel arrangement in whyte notation. The cylinders were located under the smoke chamber and propelled the cranked second axle.

The table gives values after renovation in 1843. The Nordstern was scrapped in 1865.
