= PKP class Pm36 =

Class of 4-6-2 steam locomotives

PKP Pm36
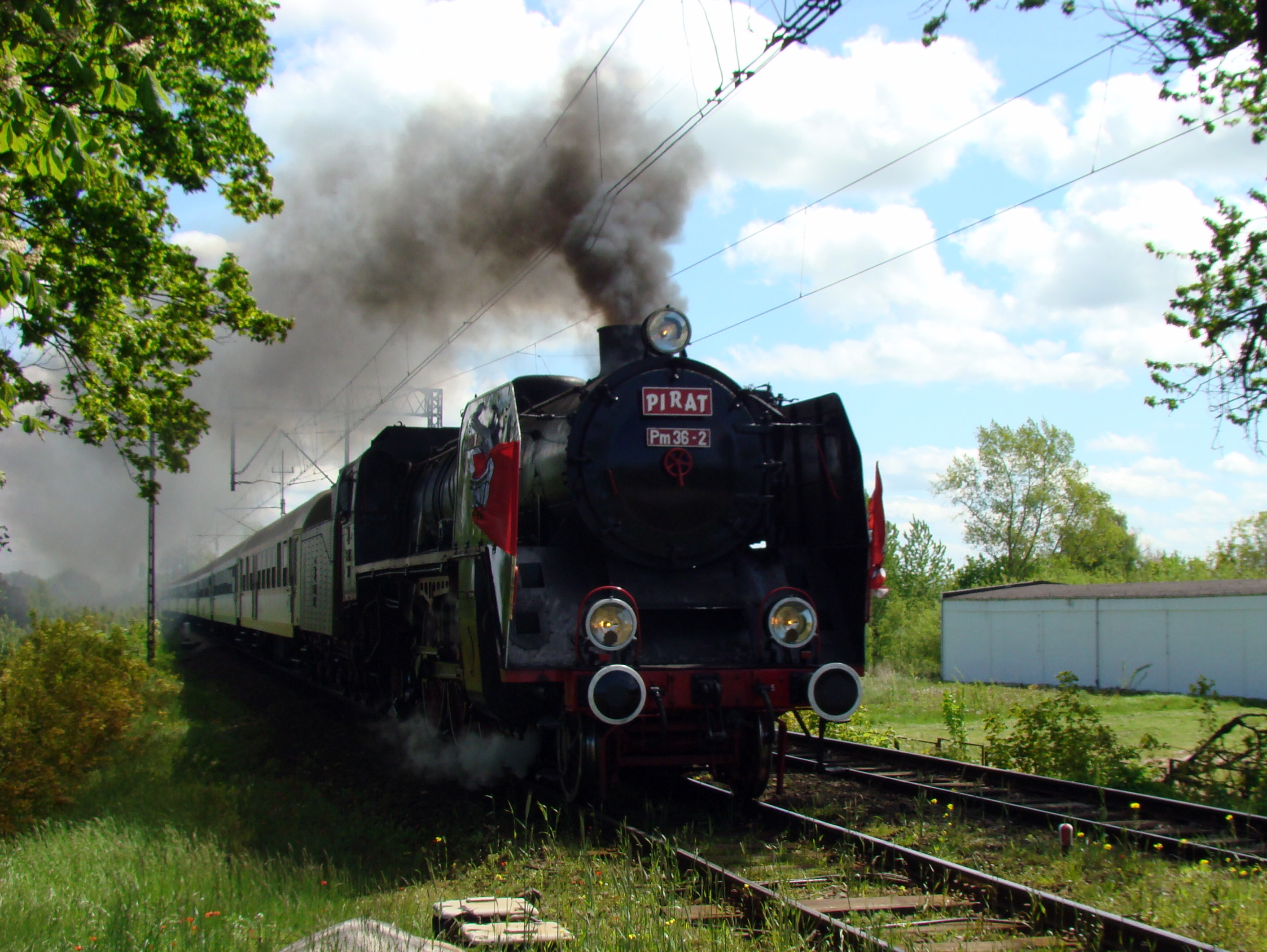
- Pm36-2 (Beautiful Helena)
Type and origin
- Power type: Steam
- Builder: Fablok
- Build date: 1937
- Total produced: 2
Specifications
- Configuration
  - Whyte: 4-6-2
  - UIC: 2′C1′ h2
- Gauge: 1,435 mm (4 ft 8 1/2 in) standard gauge
- Leading dia.: 950 mm (37.40 in)
- Driver dia.: 2,000 mm (78.74 in)
- Trailing dia.: 1,150 mm (45.28 in)
- Length: 24.843 m (81 ft 6 in)
- Axle load: 17.2 tonnes (16.9 long tons; 19.0 short tons)
- Adhesive weight: 51.6 tonnes (50.8 long tons; 56.9 short tons)
- Loco weight: 94.0 tonnes (92.5 long tons; 103.6 short tons)
- Tender weight: 72.9 tonnes (71.7 long tons; 80.4 short tons)
- Tender cap.: 9.0 tonnes (8.9 long tons; 9.9 short tons)
- Firebox
  - Grate area: 3.85 m^{2} (41.4 sq ft)
- Boiler pressure: 18 kg/cm^{2} (1.77 MPa; 256 psi)
- Heating surface
  - Firebox: 15.00 m^{2} (161.5 sq ft)
  - Total surface: 198.0 m^{2} (2,131 sq ft)
- Superheater
  - Heating area: 71.2 m^{2} (766 sq ft)
- Cylinders: Two, outside
- Cylinder size: 530 mm × 700 mm (20.87 in × 27.56 in)
- Valve gear: Heusinger (Walschaerts)
- Loco brake: Westinghouse
Performance figures
- Maximum speed: Pm36-1: 140 km/h (87 mph); Pm36-2: 130 km/h (81 mph)
- Power output: 1,325 kW (1,780 hp)
- Tractive effort: 147.5 kN (33,160 lbf)
Career
- Operators: PKP » DRB » PKP
- Class: PKP: Pm36; DRB: 18^{6}
- Numbers: PKP: Pm36-1 to Pm36-2; DRB: 18 601 to 18 602
- Nicknames: Piękna Helena
- Locale: Poland
- Retired: 1965
- Restored: 1995
- Current owner: PKP

PKP class Pm36 is a class of two express passenger (P) 4-6-2 (m) steam locomotives ordered in 1936 for the Polskie Koleje Państwowe (Polish State Railways).

== History ==
=== Design ===
The design was ready in 1936, and in the following year, the first two prototypes were built. One of them, Pm36-1, had aerodynamic fairing. The construction as well as the shape of it was designed by inz. Kazimierz Zembrzuski, head of the design office in the First Polish Factory of Locomotives and at the same time professor of the Warsaw University of Technology. The other (Pm36-2) had a standard look. The idea was to test both engines in parallel to compare top speed, acceleration, coal and water consumption etc. The Pm36-1 won a gold medal at the 1937 International Exposition of Art and Technology in Paris.

=== Service ===
After the German occupation of Poland during World War II, the two locomotives were renumbered into the Deutsche Reichsbahn (DRB) fleet as 18 601 and 18 602 (class 18^{6}). The 18 601 had its streamlining removed, but was later damaged and subsequently scrapped (probably in 1942). The 18 602 survived the war, and was returned to Poland where it regained its PKP class and number. It continued to work for PKP until 1965, when it was given to the Warsaw Railway Museum.

=== Present day ===
In 1995, the machine went through a major overhaul and is now working in Wolsztyn as a tourist attraction, called Beautiful Helen (pl. Piękna Helena). It is occasionally used in regular service, pulling trains to Poznań or Leszno. Currently, Beautiful Helena waits for repair in Wolsztyn.

== Gallery ==
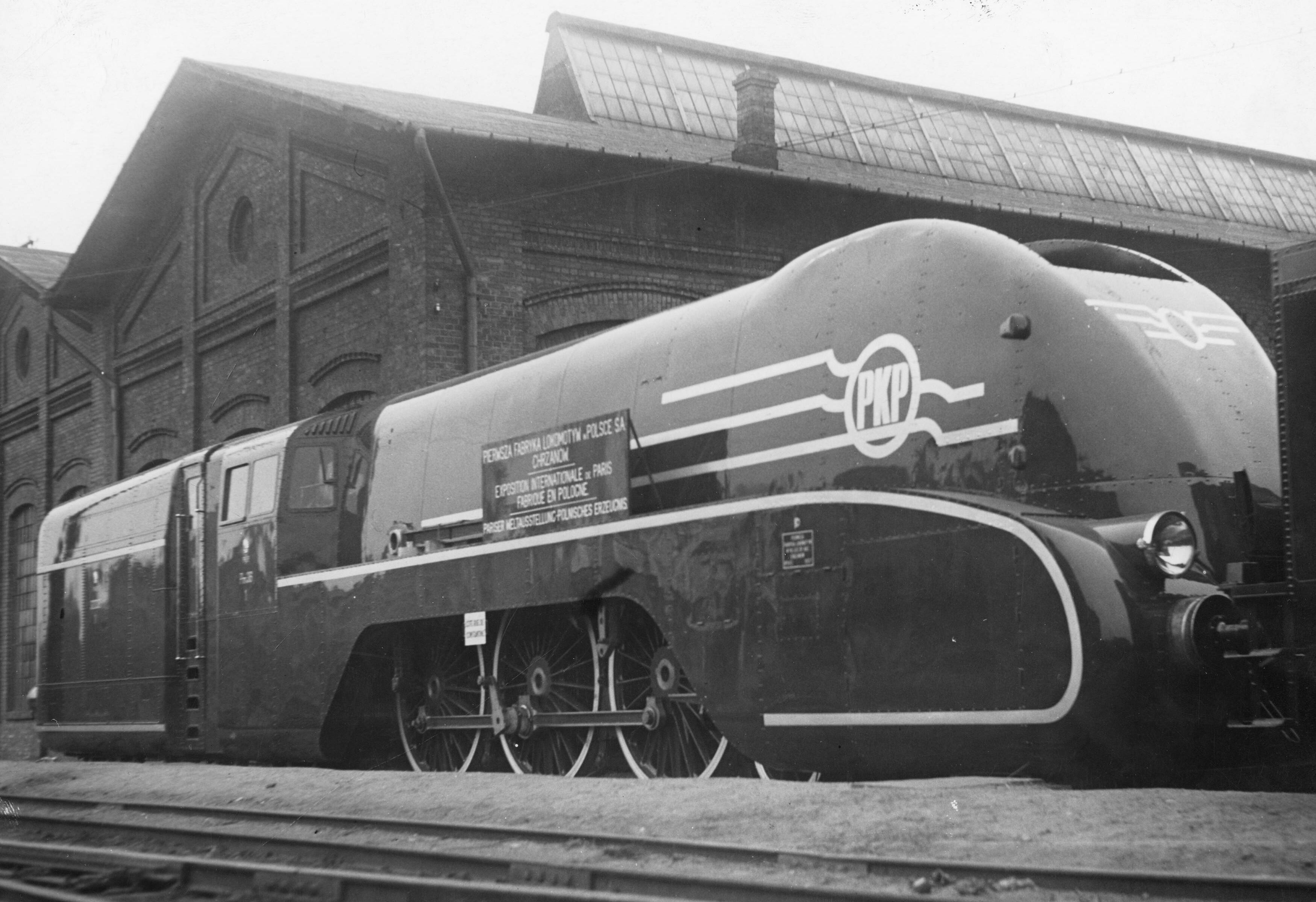
Pm36 with aerodynamic fairing, World Expo 1937

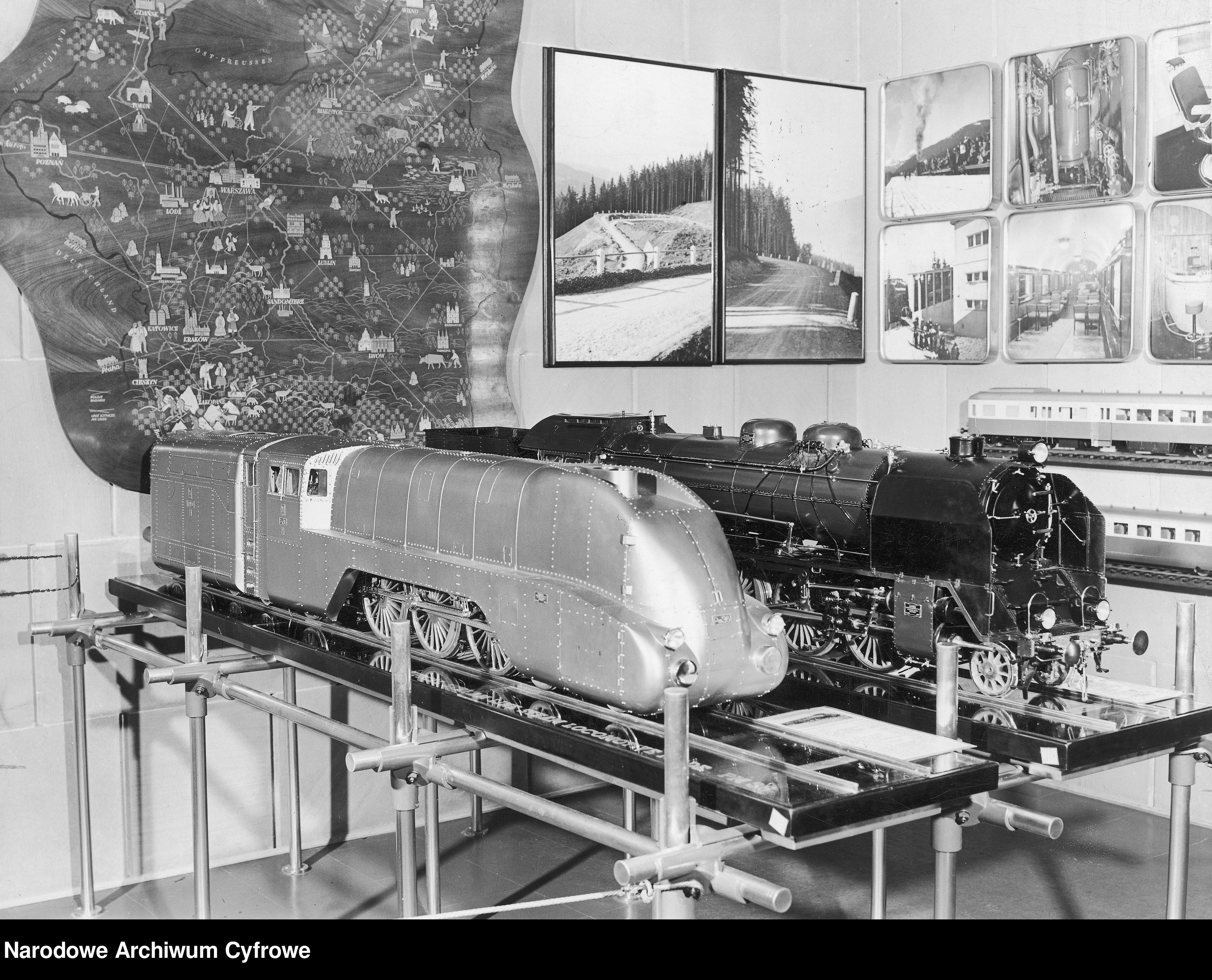
Pm36 model with aerodynamic fairing, World Expo 1939

== See also ==
- PKP classification system
