= Prussian G 10 =

German steam locomotives, built 1910–1925

Prussian G 10 DRG Class 57.10–35 kukHB 680 ÖBB 657 PKP Tw1 FS Class 473 SNCB Type 90
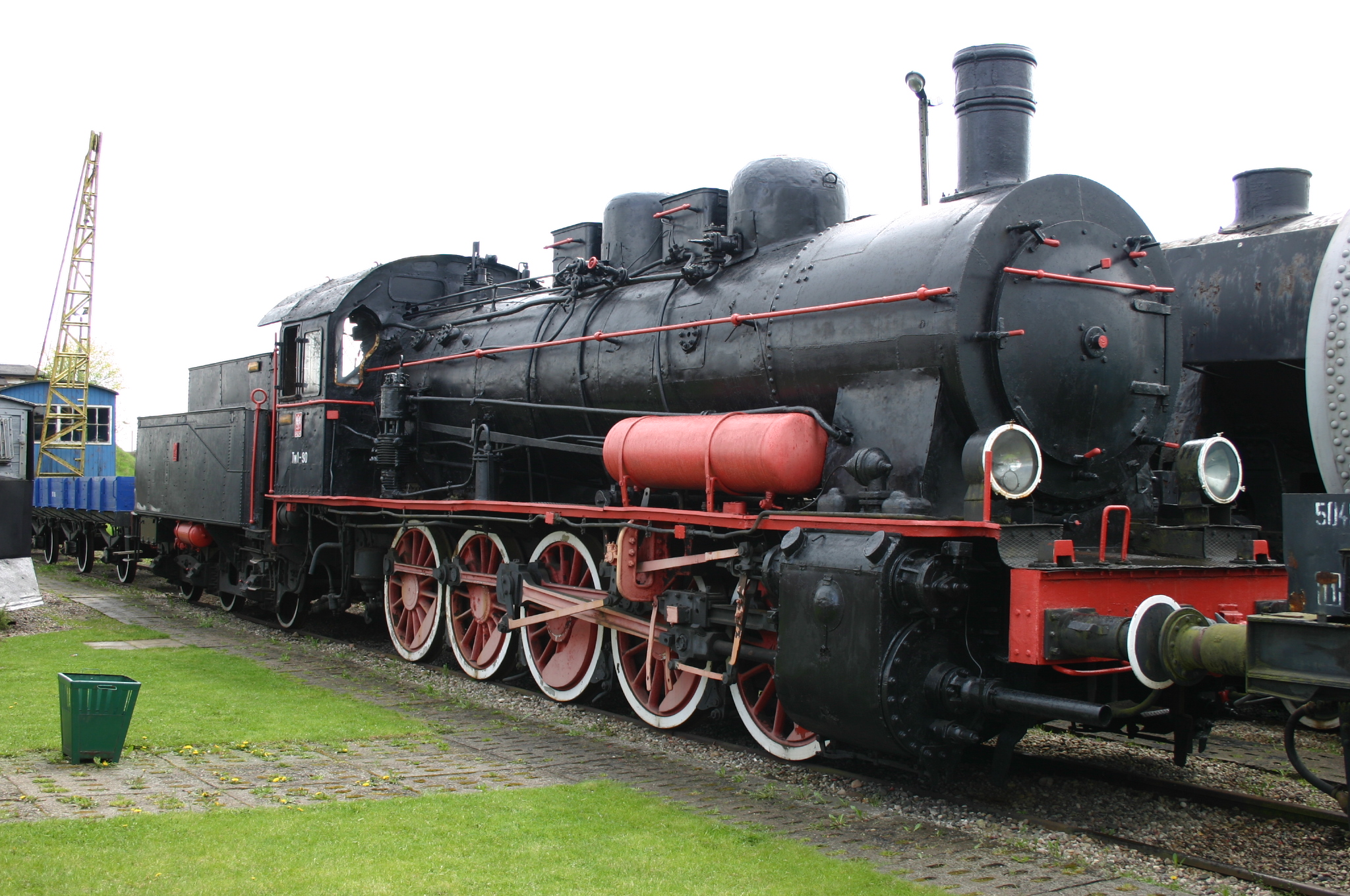
Type and origin
- Builder: Borsig; Grafenstaden; Hanomag; Henschel & Sohn; Hohenzollern; Krupp; Orenstein & Koppel; Rheinmetall; Berliner Maschinenbau
- Build date: 1910–1925
- Total produced: 2,677 (Germany)
Specifications
- Configuration
  - Whyte: 0-10-0
  - German: Gt 55.15
- Gauge: 1,435 mm (4 ft 8 1/2 in) standard gauge
- Driver dia.: 1,400 mm (55 1/8 in)
- Axle load: 15.3 t (15.1 long tons; 16.9 short tons)
- Adhesive weight: 76.6 t (75.4 long tons; 84.4 short tons)
- Service weight: 76.6 t (75.4 long tons; 84.4 short tons)
- Water cap.: 16.5–21.5 m^{3} (3,600–4,700 imp gal; 4,400–5,700 US gal)
- Boiler pressure: 12 bar (1.20 MPa; 174 psi)
- Heating surface
  - Firebox: 2.58 m^{2} (27.8 sq ft)
  - Evaporative: 146.00 m^{2} (1,571.5 sq ft)
- Superheater
  - Heating area: 58.80 m^{2} (632.9 sq ft)
- Cylinders: 2
- Cylinder size: 630 mm (24 13/16 in)
- Piston stroke: 660 mm (26 in)
Performance figures
- Maximum speed: 60 km/h (37 mph)
- Indicated power: 1,100 PS (809 kW; 1,080 hp)
Career
- Numbers: DRG 57 1001–2763; 57 2892-3524; DR 57 3551, 4245
- Retired: 1968

The Prussian G 10 was a German goods train, steam locomotive, whose design was based on a combination of the running and valve gear from the Prussian T 16 and the boiler from the Prussian P 8. In developing the G 10, however, the T 16 running gear with side play on the first and fifth axles was modified. The T 16 was also subsequently built with this modified configuration and called the Prussian T 16.1. The G 10 was intended for heavy goods train duties on main lines, but as a result of its low axle load it could be employed more flexibly than its equally powerful cousin, the Prussian G 8.1. The G 10 was occasionally even used in passenger train service.

Between 1910 and 1924 no less than 2,615 Class G 10s were delivered to the Prussian state railways and the Deutsche Reichsbahn, 35 to the Imperial Railways in Alsace-Lorraine (see Alsace-Lorraine G 10) and 27 to the Saar Railway. Another 350 were sent to railway companies in Turkey, Romania, Poland and Lithuania.

The Deutsche Reichsbahn took over almost all the Prussian engines and continued to build the G 10 until 1924. After the First World War, 222 G 10s went to foreign railways. According to the first provisional renumbering plan of 1923, several locomotives were delivered as Class 33s, but from the end of 1923 the newly delivered locos were given their final numbers. The G 10 was allocated numbers 57 1001-2725 and 57 2892-3524. Amongst them was number 57 1124, a G 10 from Alsace-Lorraine. In 1935 the G 10s from the Saar Railways were given numbers 57 2727-2763, of which 57 2737-2763 were the Saar Railway copies built from 1921-1925. In the Second World War more locomotives were taken over from Poland as 57 2764-2772 and 57 2784-2804 and from Luxembourg as 57 2773-2783. After the war a former G 10 from Alsace-Lorraine found itself in the GDR and was classified as 57 3551. It was joined by another G 10 of unknown origin, no. 57 4245.

Nine G 10 locomotives were ceded to Italy as war reparation after World War I, and were taken over by the Ferrovie dello Stato Italiane as Class 473 (Italian: Gruppo 473).

In 1950, the Deutsche Bundesbahn had about 649 ex-Prussian G 10s in its fleet, the Deutsche Reichsbahn (East Germany) had 112 and the Saar Railways had 81. The Bundesbahn reclassified its G 10s as Class 057 in 1968, but had retired them by 1970, the last one out of service being 057 070-5 on 22 September 1970. The Reichsbahn completed their retirement of G 10s by 1972.

From 1916 the Austrian Empire's military railway (k.u.k. Heeresbahn) had 20 G 10s which were designated as Class 680 and were specifically intended for duties on the broad gauge Russian Railways. Several of them were given Reichsbahn numbers 57 2766-2768 and 57 2789-2792 during the Second World War.

After the war, some 165 engines of Class 57.10-35 remained on Austrian territory. Of these 96 continued in service as the ÖBB Class 657. The Austrian Federal Railway (ÖBB) retired them all by 1968. Number 657.2770, an engine obtained by the Austrian Society for Railway History (ÖGEG) from Romania, has been preserved in working order and is used for special services.

The vehicles were equipped with various tenders, including Prussian pr 3 T 16.5, pr 3 T 20, pr 2'2' T 21.5 and pr 2'2' T 31.5 tenders as well as the Bavarian bay 3 T 20. which had been taken over from Bavarian G 4/5 N and G 4/5 H locomotives.

== Accidents ==
Two G 10 locomotives on the Stahringen–Friedrichshafen rail line, one hauling a goods train, the other a special passenger service collided head-on in the Markdorf rail disaster on 22 December 1939, 101 people died as a result of the crash, and 47 were injured.

== See also ==
- Prussian state railways
- List of Prussian locomotives and railcars
