= Eastern National Railway (Austria) =

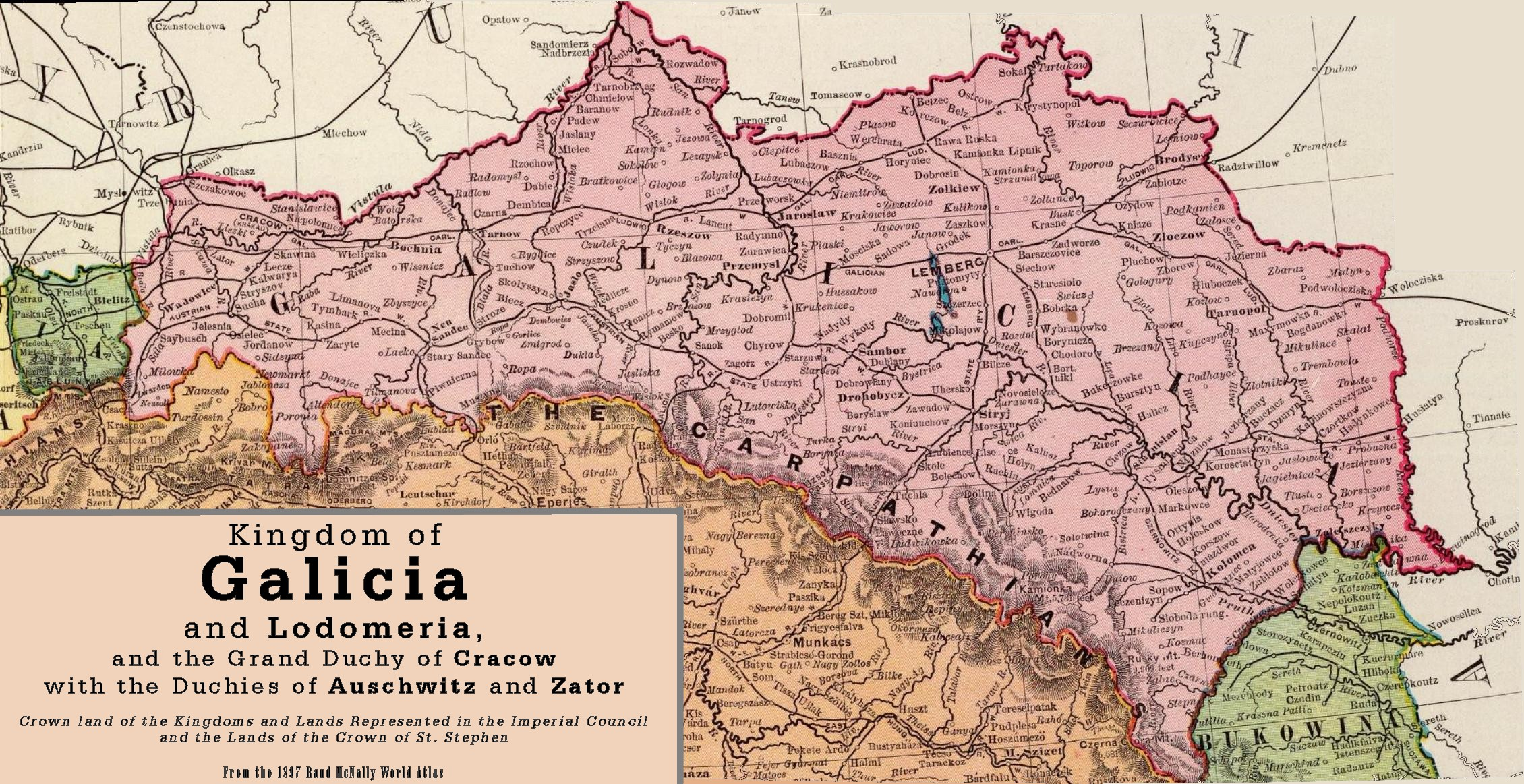
Railways lines in Galicia, 1897

The Imperial and Royal Eastern National Railway (German: k.k. Östliche Staatsbahn, ÖStB) was a national railway company in the Austrian Empire. It was founded in 1850 for the purpose of developing the railway network in the crown land of Galicia and Lodomeria. The company relied on the base of the Kraków–Upper Silesia Railway (German: Krakau-Oberschlesische Bahn; Polish: Kolej Krakowsko-Górnośląska), opened in 1847.

== History ==
On 1 March 1844 the Senate of the Free City of Kraków received the commission for the building of a railway line to Myslowitz (present-day Mysłowice), a border town in Prussian controlled Upper Silesia. The line with a length of 67 km (42 mi) was inaugurated on 13 October 1847; the continuation by the Upper Silesian Railway to Breslau (Wrocław) opened five days later. In Szczakowa, the line adjoined the border with Russian controlled Congress Poland and the Warsaw–Vienna railway line at Granica station (present-day Sosnowiec Maczki). From 1848 the Emperor Ferdinand Northern Railway line to Vienna could be reached via Oderberg (Bohumín) in Austrian Silesia. By 1849 the company owned and operated eight Borsig steam locomotives.

On 30 May 1850 the Kraków-Upper Silesia Railway was purchased by the Austrian state; responsibility for operating the link was transferred per 1 January 1852. Another branch-off from Trzebinia via Auschwitz (Oświęcim) to Dzieditz (Dziedzice) was inaugurated on 1 March 1856, providing a direct link to the Northern Railway on Austrian territory.

In 1858 the company was again resolved, and its network was divided among companies in private property. All its lines west of Kraków were left to the Northern Railway, while all its lines east of the city were left to the newly established Galician Railway of Archduke Charles Louis (Galizische Carl Ludwig-Bahn, CLB).

=== Railway lines ===
- Kraków – Szczakowa – Mysłowice (taken over from the Kraków–Upper Silesian Railway)
- Trzebinia – Oświęcim, opened on 1 March 1856
- Kraków – Bieżanów – Podłęże – Dębica, opened on 20 February 1856
- Bieżanów – Wieliczka, opened on 26 January 1857
- Dębica – Rzeszów, completed on 15 November 1858 by the CLB
