= Emperor Ferdinand Northern Railway =

Early Austrian railway company (1837–1907)

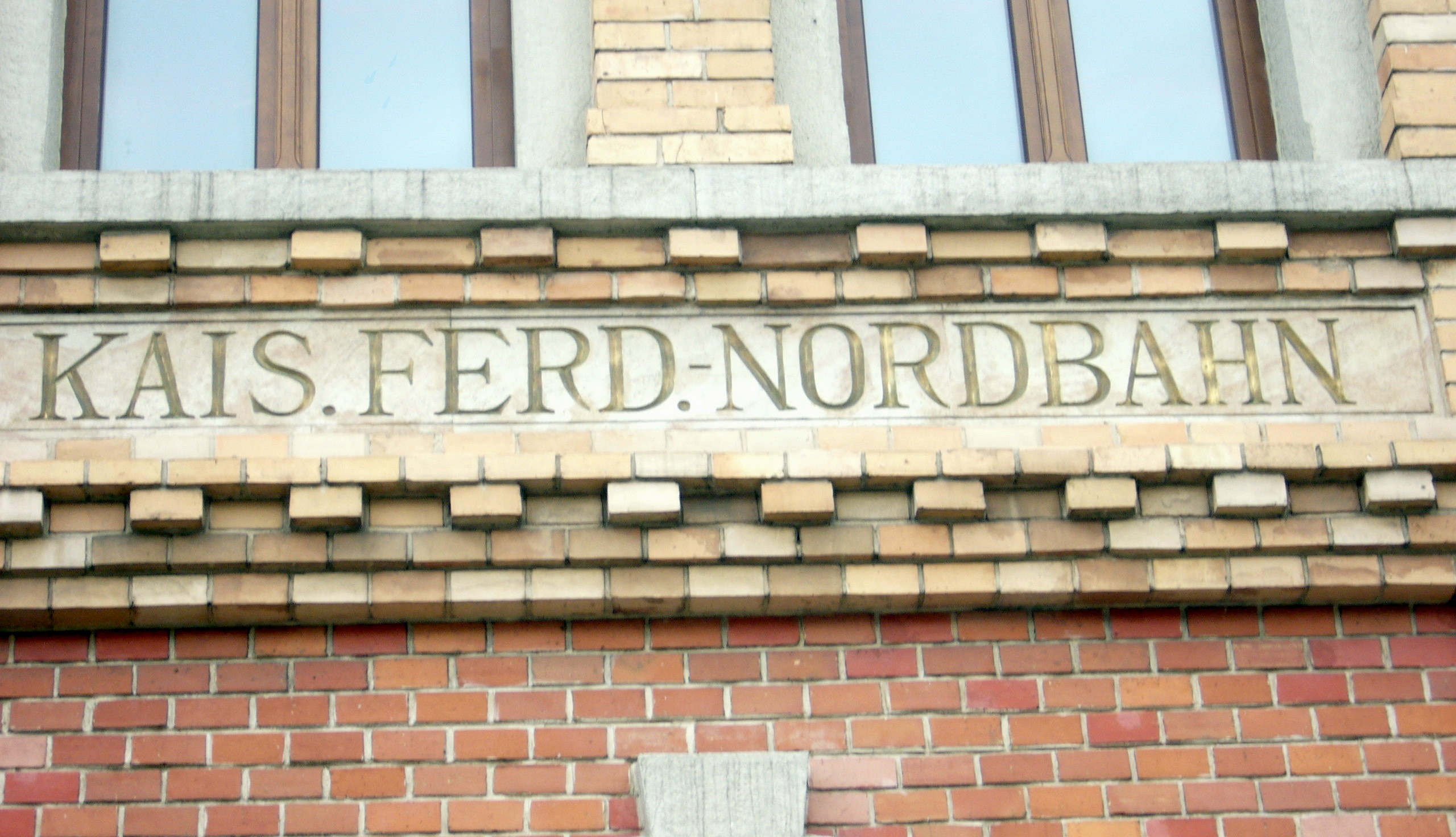
Kaiser Ferdinands-Nordbahn inscribed in abbreviated form on the façade of finance by royal familyv the main railway station in Bielsko-Biała, Poland

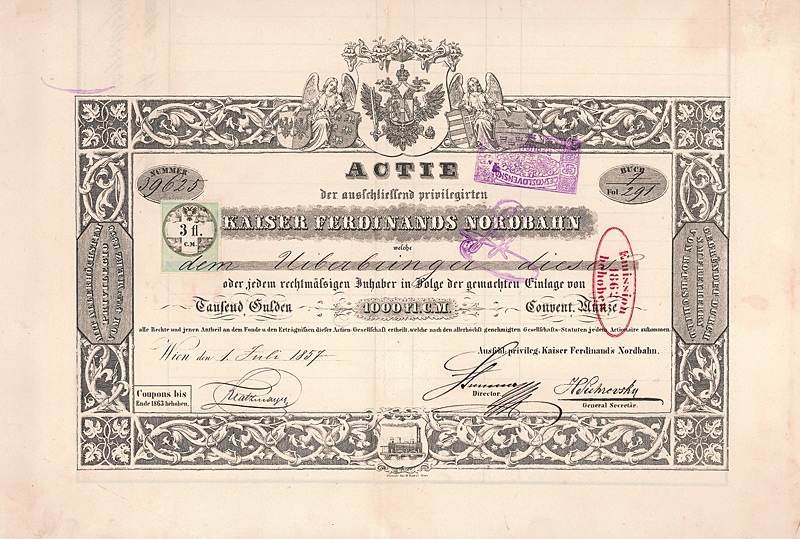
Share of the Emperor Ferdinand Northern Railway, issued 1. July 1857

The Emperor Ferdinand Northern Railway (German: Kaiser Ferdinands-Nordbahn; Czech: Severní dráha císaře Ferdinanda; Polish: Kolej Północna Cesarza Ferdynanda) was a railway company during the time of the Austrian Empire. Its main line was intended to connect Vienna with the salt mines in Bochnia near Kraków. The name is still used today in referring to a number of railway lines formerly operated by that company.

== History ==
The Nordbahn, financed by Salomon Mayer von Rothschild (1774–1855), was Austria's first steam railway company. The first stretch, between Floridsdorf and Deutsch Wagram, was opened in 1837. An extension to Vienna was built in 1838, and the track through Břeclav to Brno in 1839. The first train from Vienna arrived in Břeclav railway station on 6 June 1839. By 1841, the railway had reached Přerov and Olomouc and in 1842 Lipník nad Bečvou. An extension to Ostrava and Bohumín was completed in 1847.

The Nordbahn never directly reached Kraków or Bochnia. The first rail connection to Kraków via Bohumín, Kozle, and Mysłowice was provided by the Prussian Wilhelmsbahn and Oberschlesische Eisenbahn (Upper Silesian Railway). The line from Mysłowice to Kraków was built by the Krakau-Oberschlesische Bahn (Kraków and Upper Silesian Railway). An entirely Austrian rail route from Vienna to Kraków did not exist until, in 1856, the k.k. Östliche Staatsbahn (Imperial and Royal Eastern State Railway), a descendant of the Kraków and Upper Silesian, opened a branch form Trzebinia via Oświęcim to Czechowice-Dziedzice, where it met the Northern Railway.

The Northern Railway company was nationalized in 1907. It also owned many coal mines and other industry enterprises in the Ostrava region. After the nationalization of its railway network, the company continued to operate its coal and industry businesses.

The original Nordbahnhof in the Austrian capital (Vienna North railway station) was destroyed in World War II. It was rebuilt and re-opened in 1962 as Wien Praterstern together with the bridge across the Danube. Today's express trains from Vienna to Brno now leave from Wien Hauptbahnhof, and Praterstern is served by suburban and regional trains only.

== Lines in Central Europe built by the Nordbahn in the period up to 1856 ==
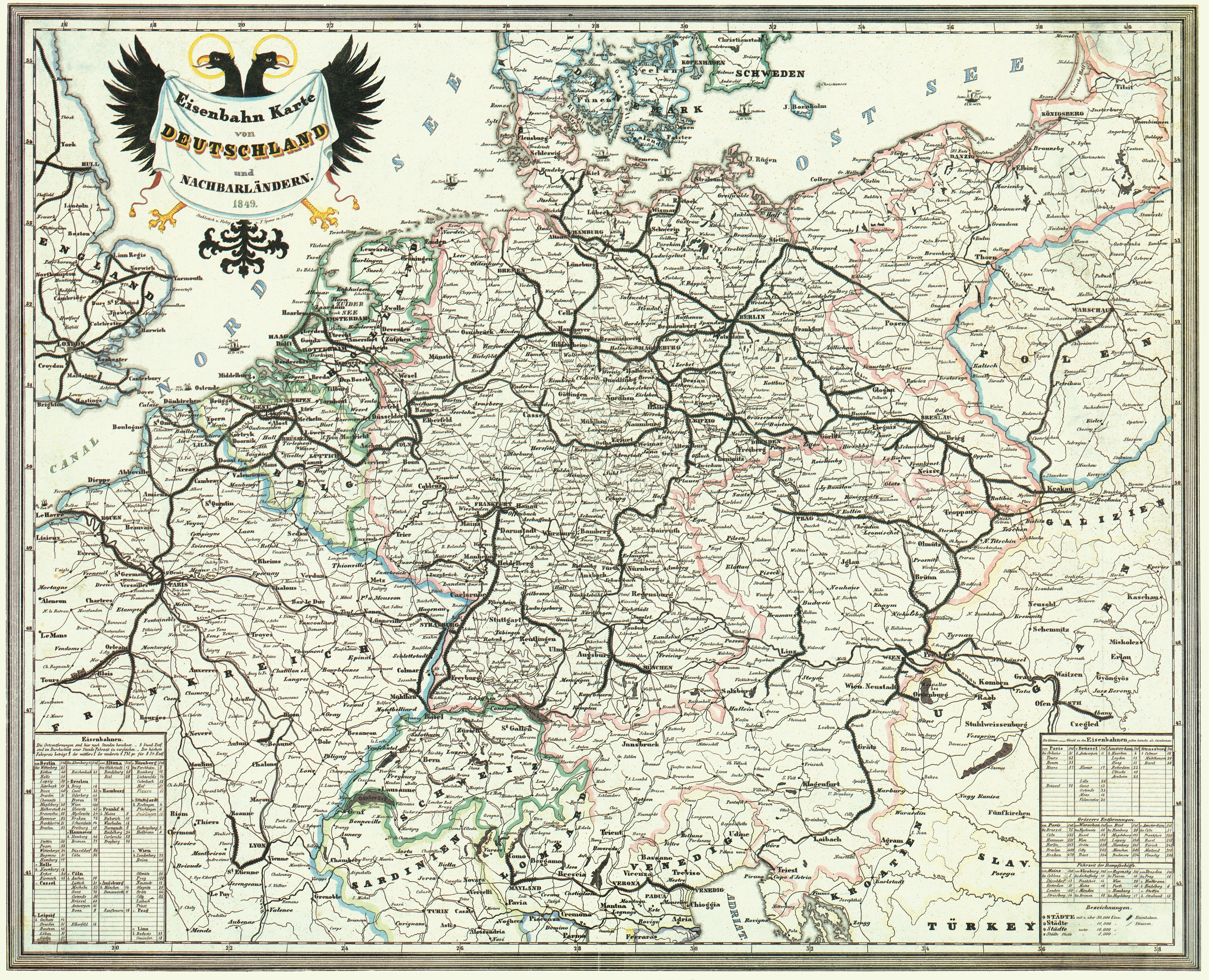
Railways in Germany and neighbouring countries in 1849; bold lines = working, narrow lines = projected or in construction

Town names are indicated as they were at the time of opening.

- Floridsdorf–Deutsch Wagram (1837). First steam-powered railway in Austria.
- Wien (Wien Nordbahnhof)–Gänserndorf (1838)
- Gänserndorf–Lundenburg (1839). The oldest steam-powered railway in today's Czech Republic
- Lundenburg–Brünn (1839)
- Lundenburg–Göding–Altstadt–Prerau (1841)
- Prerau–Olmütz (1841)
- Prerau–Leipnik (1842)
- Leipnik–Weißkirchen – Ostrau – Oderberg (1847)
- Ostrau–Troppau (1855)
- Oderberg–Petrowitz bei Freistadt–Auschwitz; Czechowitz-Dzieditz–Bielitz (1855)
- Auschwitz–Krakau. This line was built by the Eastern National Railway in 1856, and later taken over by the Northern Railway.

== Telegraph service ==
The railway used a telegraph system designed by Alexander Bain, in particular along the Vienna to Bochnia line, as late as 1886; the system was slower at messaging than the later Morse systems.

== Rolling stock ==
=== Steam locomotives of the first period (1837–1842) ===
- Austria and Moravia
- Samson, Hercules, and Vulcan
- Vindobona
- Saturn and Mercur
- Columbus
- Jupiter, Gigant, Concordia, and Bruna
- Rakete
- Bucephalus
- Magnet
- Nordstern
- Atlas and Vesta
- Patria
- New York
- Minotaurus and Ajax
- Adler and Pfeil
- Baltimore
- Virginia und Florida
- Phönix, Meteor, Titan, and Pluto
- Olomucia and Comet
- Theseus and Centaur
- Planet, Delphin, Blitz, and Neptun
- Cyclop and Goliath

=== Steam locomotives of the second period (1844–1906) ===
- Koloss and Elephant
- Donau to Aetna
- Adonis to Ganymed
- Orpheus, Aeolus, and Ulysses
- Prometheus to Andromeda
- Orion and Lucifer
- Aeneas to Orestes
- Nestor to Ariadne, Bihar to Üllö, Jason II
- Austria II to Salamander
- Hebe I, Proserpina and Daphne I
- Vulcan II to Glaucos I
- Fortuna I to Leda I
- Tiger to Mora
- Telegraph I bis Euterpe I
- Vindobona II to Flora
- Antilope I to Mazeppa
- Tiberius to Pilades
- Borsig 815–820, 828–833
- Jupiter II to Clio

== Legacy ==
The Northern Railway was selected as the main motif of a very high-value collectors' coin: the Austrian Emperor Ferdinand's North Railway commemorative coin, minted on 13 June 2007. The reverse side depicts a scene of the steam locomotive "Ajax" steam crossing the bridge over the Danube on the first public run from the North Railway Station in Vienna to Deutsch-Wagram on 6 January 1838. The journey, which caused quite a sensation, was witnessed and cheered by crowds of Viennese who had gathered along its route.

== See also ==
- History of rail transport in Austria
- History of rail transport in the Czech Republic
- History of rail transport in Poland
- Imperial Royal Austrian State Railways
