= Heusinger von Waldegg =

Heusinger von Waldegg is a surname of German descent. It is often used abbreviated as "Heusinger" in many forms (especially in the United States).

Notable people with the surname include:

- Adolf Heusinger (1897–1982), Nazi general and Chairman of the NATO Military Committee
- Edmund Heusinger von Waldegg (1817–1886), German railway pioneer
- Karl Friedrich Heusinger (1792–1883), German pathologist
- Patrick Heusinger (born 1981), American actor
