= Prussian G 7.3 =

Class of 85 German 2-8-0 locomotives

Prussian G 7.3 Mecklenburgische G 7.3 DR Class 56.0/2 PKP Tr1
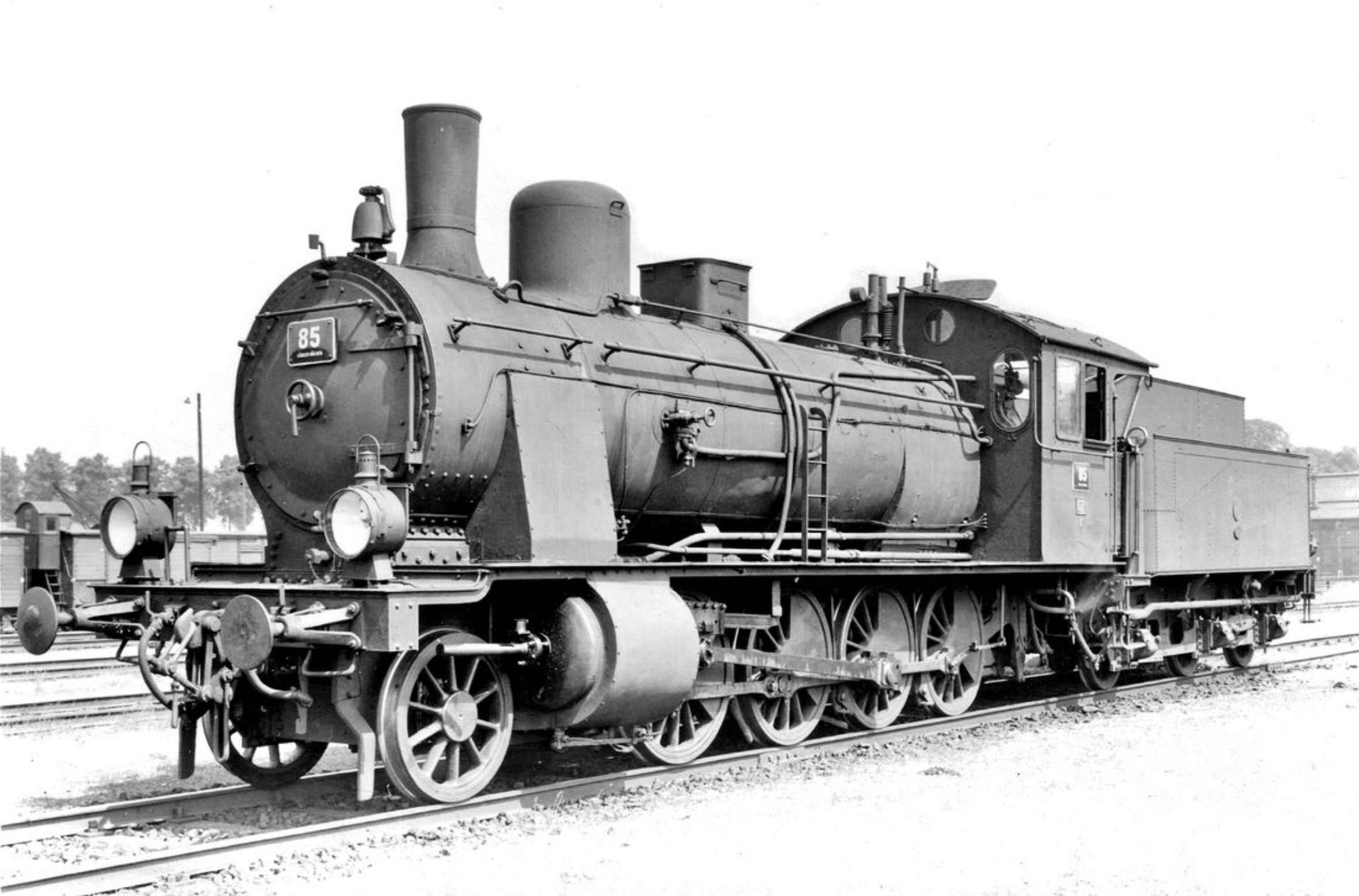
- Lübeck-Büchen Railway (LBE) No. 85 in 1932
Type and origin
- Builder: Hanomag; J.A. Maffei; Krauss; Maschinenfabrik Esslingen
- Build date: 1893/94 and 1917
- Total produced: 85
Specifications
- Configuration
  - Whyte: 2-8-0
  - German: G 45.17
- Gauge: 1,435 mm (4 ft 8 1/2 in)
- Leading dia.: 1,000 mm (3 ft 3 3/8 in)
- Driver dia.: 1,250 mm (4 ft 1 1/4 in)
- Length
  - Over beams: 16,318 or 17,352 mm (53 ft 6 1/2 in or 56 ft 11 1/4 in)
- Axle load: 12.63 or 13.13 t (12.43 or 12.92 long tons; 13.92 or 14.47 short tons)
- Adhesive weight: 50.5 or 52.5 t (49.7 or 51.7 long tons; 55.7 or 57.9 short tons)
- Service weight: 56.2 or 60.5 t (55.3 or 59.5 long tons; 61.9 or 66.7 short tons)
- Water cap.: 12.0 or 16.5 m^{3} (2,600 or 3,600 imp gal; 3,200 or 4,400 US gal)
- Boiler pressure: 12 or 14 kgf/cm^{2} (1,180 or 1,370 kPa; 171 or 199 lbf/in^{2})
- Heating surface
  - Firebox: 2.31 m^{2} (24.9 sq ft)
  - Evaporative: 146.9 m^{2} (1,581 sq ft)
- High-pressure cylinder: 530 mm (20 7/8 in)
- Low-pressure cylinder: 750 mm (29 1/2 in)
- Piston stroke: 630 mm (24 13/16 in)
Performance figures
- Maximum speed: 45 km/h (28 mph)
Career
- Numbers: DR 55 701, 56 001–005, 56 201–205
- Retired: by 1945
- Where two figures are given, the second relates to the 1917 deliveries

The Prussian G 7.3 was a class of 2-8-0 locomotives of the Prussian state railways. The third class of the G 7 series, they were intended to power heavy goods trains on steep inclines, on which the permissible axle load was not yet that high. This affected for example, the Paderborn–Holzminden and Betzdorf–Siegen routes.

A larger boiler could be used due to the front carrying axle. Like the G 7.2, the G 7.3 was designed as a compound locomotive. A total of only fifteen of these locomotives were built between 1893 and 1895, all of them by Hanomag; this was due to an increase in the permissible axle loads which meant that the cheaper G 7.1s, without a front carrying axle, could also travel on these routes. In World War I this type was remembered because there was a need for simple locomotives with a low axle load, and production was resumed. Another 70 locomotives were built by J. A. Maffei, Krauss and Maschinenfabrik Esslingen. They differed from the earlier series, among other thinks, with a higher boiler pressure of 14 kgf/cm^{2} (1,370 kPa; 199 lbf/in^{2}) and a feedwater heater. They were delivered directly to the German Army railways (Heeresbahnen).

After World War I several locomotives had to be surrendered to foreign railways. The Polish State Railways (PKP) operated 23 locomotives under the class designation Tr1.

The Grand Duchy of Mecklenburg Friedrich-Franz Railway (MFFE) bought five G 7.3 locomotives second-hand, and the Lübeck-Büchen Railway Company (LBE) bought four G 7.3s, also second-hand. In 1925, the Deutsche Reichsbahn included eleven locomotives in their renumbering plan. The G 7.3s from Prussia were renumbered 55 701 and 56 001 to 56 005, those from the MFFE, 56 201 to 56 205. After the nationalisation of the LBE in 1938, its two remaining locomotives were renumbered as (second) 56 001 and 56 002.
