= KkStB 270 =

kkStB 270 BBÖ 270 / ČSD 434.1 / FS 728 / JDŽ 25 / PKP Tr12 / MÁV 403.6 / CFR 140.2 / DSA 140 ÖBB 156 HSH 56
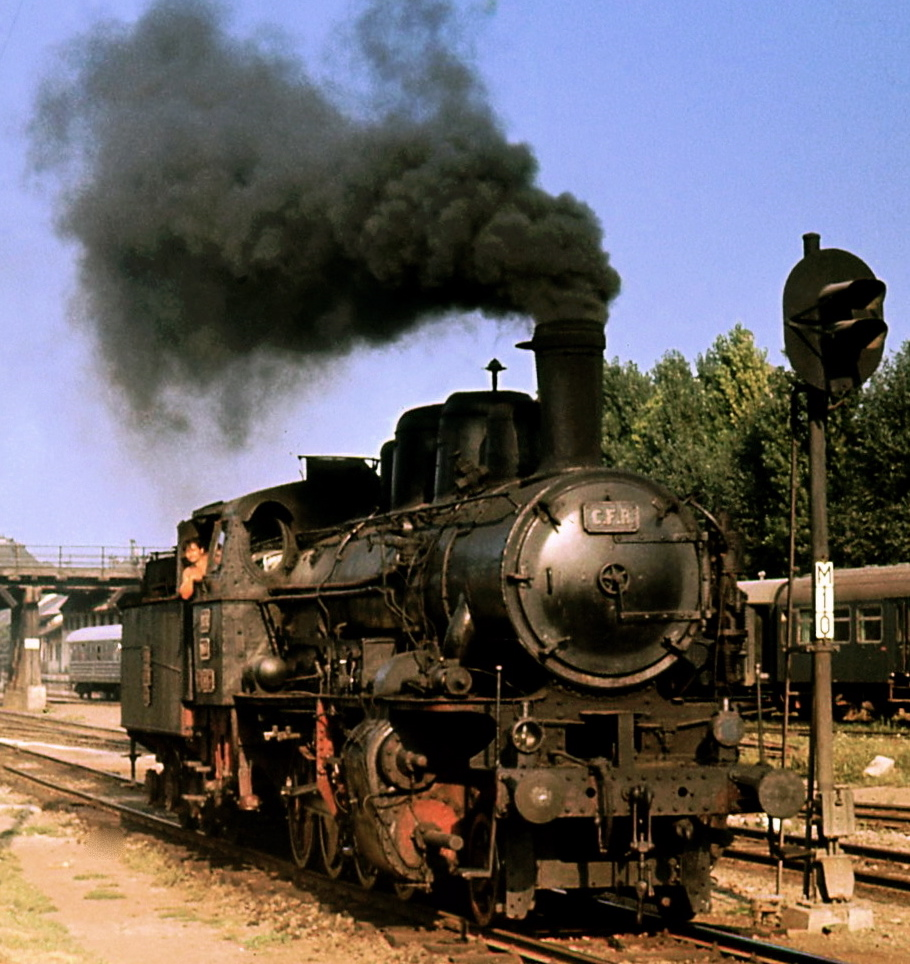
- CFR 140 class at Cluj, August 1972
Type and origin
- Builder: Lokomotivfabrik Floridsdorf; Böhmisch-Mährische Maschinenfabrik; Breitfeld & Danek; ČKD; Adamov; Škoda Works; Wiener Neustädter Lokomotivfabrik
- Build date: 1917–1930
- Total produced: kkStB: 7 (to ČSD); ČSD: 165+34 (1918 ex kkStB, 1945 ex BBÖ); BBÖ: 100; SHS: 9; CFR: 132; FS: 35; PKP: 142; MÀV: 8; ÖBB: 25; HSH: 5
Specifications
- Configuration
  - Whyte: 2-8-0
- Gauge: 1,435 mm (4 ft 8 1/2 in) standard gauge
- Leading dia.: 830 mm (2 ft 8 5/8 in)
- Driver dia.: 1,258 mm (4 ft 1 1/2 in)
- Wheelbase
  - Overall: 6,800 mm (22 ft 3 3/4 in)
  - incl. tender: 13,712 mm (539 3/4 in)
- Length: 17,443 mm (57 ft 2 3/4 in)
- Height: 4,589 mm (15 ft 5/8 in)
- Adhesive weight: 57.3 t (56.4 long tons; 63.2 short tons)
- Empty weight: 61.2 t (60.2 long tons; 67.5 short tons)
- Service weight: 68.0 t (66.9 long tons; 75.0 short tons)
- Boiler
- No. of heating tubes: 173
- No. of smoke tubes: 24
- Boiler pressure: 13 kgf/cm^{2} (1,270 kPa; 185 lbf/in^{2})
- Heating surface
  - Firebox: 3.87 m^{2} (41.7 sq ft)
  - Radiative: 13.90 m^{2} (149.6 sq ft)
  - Tubes: 169.80 m^{2} (1,827.7 sq ft)
- Superheater
  - Heating area: 38.3 m^{2} (412 sq ft)
- Cylinders: Two, outside
- Cylinder size: 570 mm (22 7/16 in)
- Piston stroke: 632 mm (24 7/8 in)
Performance figures
- Maximum speed: 60 km/h (37 mph)
Career
- Numbers: kkStB: 270.01–270.07; ČSD: 434.101–1199; BBÖ: 270.103 … 270.312
- Retired: ÖBB: 1968; ČSD: 1976

The kkStB 270 was a class of 2-8-0 locomotives with the Imperial Austrian State Railways (k.k. österreichische Staatsbahnen), kkStB.

== Class 270 in Austria ==
Twenty years passed between the appearance of the class 170 and its superheated steam variant, as the military preferred the simply constructed saturated steam locomotives. It was not until 1915 that Johann Rihosek, Karl Gölsdorf's assistant, worked out the design of the superheated steam two-cylinder locomotive. The Bohemian-Moravian Machine Factory (Böhmisch-Mährische Maschinenfabrik, BMMF) took over the construction work. As was customary in Austria, the superheater surface area was rather small, as it was feared, rightly, that the domestic lubricating oil would not be able to withstand higher temperatures. The pulling power of the 270s was considerably higher than that of the 170s: it could pull 1,220 tonnes (1,200 long tons; 1,340 short tons) at 60 km/h (37 mph). The two steam domes with connecting pipes from the 170s were replaced by a simple steam dome and two sand domes.

Due to the war, the first 7 locomotives were not delivered by the BMMF until 1917. Twenty-seven locomotives had been produced by the end of the war. The machines for the BBÖ were only built in quantity between 1920 and 1922, and while a large number were ordered from Lokomotivfabrik Floridsdorf, only a total of 100 units were put into service by the BBÖ; the remainder of the locomotives went elsewhere, leaving large gaps in the BBÖ number sequence. The entire BBÖ inventory was taken over by the Deutsche Reichsbahn in 1938 as 56 3401 to 56 3500. After the Second World War, only 25 remained in Austria, which the ÖBB classified as series 156. Giesl ejectors were installed in 15 locomotives and a front-end throttle was applied. In 1968 the ÖBB retired the last locomotives in this series. Only the 156.3423 (ex 270.125) remained.

== Class 270 in Czechoslovakia ==
Part of the 270 class remained in the newly founded Czechoslovakia after the First World War. The Czechoslovak State Railways (ČSD) had another 119 machines built from 1919. While these were initially supplied by the Austrian manufacturers Wiener Neustädter Lokomotivfabrik and Lokomotivfabrik Floridsdorf, from 1920 almost all Czech locomotive manufacturers were included in the production. From 1924 the locomotives received the new class designation 434.1. The 434.1165 was the last machine to enter service until 1930. Characteristic of its appearance were its bulbous chimney with the brim, the three domes in the middle of the boiler and its driver's cab.

After the Second World War, 34 former BBÖ locomotives remained in Czechoslovakia, so that their number increased to 199 locomotives. They were mainly used in freight train and shunting services until they were replaced primarily by the T 458.1 series diesel locomotives. Most locomotives retired from active service by 1972. The last operational machine was the 434.1181, which was retired on 16 March 1976.

434.1100 (the first locomotive manufactured by the Škoda Works) was preserved as an operational museum locomotive of the ČD and 434.1128 in the Žilina depot as a museum locomotive of the ŽSR.

== Class 270 in Albania ==
Hekurudha Shqiptare, the railway operator of Albania, received four locomotives of this class in 1948 from Russia, and a possible fifth in 1952. These locomotives, 56 3408, 56 3415, 56 3457, 56 3496 and the possible 56 3445, were former Deutsche Reichsbahn locomotives seized by Russia during World War II and kept as war booty. They were the first locomotives for the new railways of the country. Locomotive 56 3408, the former 270.110 was still stored near Shkozet in 1998.

== Class 270 in other successor states of Austria-Hungary ==
Lokomotivfabrik Floridsdorf delivered a total of 253 copies of the 270 class to Poland, where the Polish State Railways (PKP) classified them as class Tr12. They were also delivered to Czechoslovakia, to Yugoslavia (JDŽ 25), to Italy (FS 728) and to Romania (CFR 140.2). PKP procured further machines, which were delivered to Poland in the form of semi-finished parts from the Wiener Neustädter Lokomotivfabrik. When Czechoslovakia ceded parts of the country to Hungary, machines of the 434.1 series came to Hungarian State Railways (MÁV) as 403.6. Romania also ordered other machines of this series from Škoda Works in Plzeň in Czechoslovakia and from Schneider et Cie. in Le Creusot (France). In addition, the machine factory of the Hungarian State Railways built eight copies for the Danube-Save-Adria Railway, the successor to the Austrian Southern Railway Company (Südbahngesellschaft), which it called the 140 series. These machines came to MÁV in 1934 as the 403.5 series.

== See also ==
- Deutsche Reichsbahn
- List of DRG locomotives and railbuses
