= Bavarian G 4/5 N =

Early twentieth century German steam locomotive

Bavarian G 4/5 N DRG Class 56.4
Type and origin
- Builder: Krauss
- Build date: 1905–1906
- Total produced: 7
Specifications
- Configuration
  - Whyte: 2-8-0
- Gauge: 1,435 mm (4 ft 8 1/2 in)
- Leading dia.: 1,006 mm (3 ft 3 5/8 in)
- Driver dia.: 1,270 mm (4 ft 2 in)
- Length
  - Over beams: 18,354 mm (60 ft 2 1/2 in)
- Axle load: 14.4 t (14.2 long tons; 15.9 short tons)
- Adhesive weight: 55.9 t (55.0 long tons; 61.6 short tons)
- Service weight: 64.8 t (63.8 long tons; 71.4 short tons)
- Water cap.: 18.2 m^{3} (4,000 imp gal; 4,800 US gal)
- Boiler pressure: 12 kgf/cm^{2} (1,180 kPa; 171 lbf/in^{2})
- Heating surface
  - Firebox: 2.85 m^{2} (30.7 sq ft)
  - Evaporative: 179.70 m^{2} (1,934.3 sq ft)
- Cylinders: 2
- Cylinder size: 540 mm (21 1/4 in)
- Piston stroke: 610 mm (24 in)
Career
- Numbers: K.Bay.Sts.E.: 2131–2137; DRG: 56 401 – 56 404
- Retired: 1927

The Bavarian Class G 4/5 N was an early twentieth century German 2-8-0 steam locomotive built for the Royal Bavarian State Railways (K.Bay.Sts.B.). Its design was based on that of the Class E I and it had unmistakable similarities to the final series of that class. Had the K.Bay.Sts.B. not changed their locomotive classification system just before this engine was produced it may well have entered service as the latest variant of E I.

In developing the E I and G 4/5 N, advantage was taken of the knowledge gained from two goods locomotives bought from the United States and which were also classified as E I's.

The firm of Krauss supplied seven of these locomotives in 1905 and 1906. As a result of the relatively high position of the boiler, the firebox was located above the locomotive frame. This characteristic design feature of Bavarian locomotives, influenced by Maffei, could already be seen and was utilised subsequently by the Baden VIIIe, Swiss GB C 4/5 and eventually the Bavarian G 4/5 H - albeit the latter being developed by Maffei.

The Deutsche Reichsbahn took over four examples from the Bavarian State Railways, which had survived World War I and gave them the operating numbers 56 401–404. They continued in service until 1927.

The engines were equipped with a Bavarian 2'2' T 18,2 tender.

== See also ==
- Royal Bavarian State Railways
- List of Bavarian locomotives and railbuses
