= Podłęże, Wieliczka County =

Podłęże
- Village
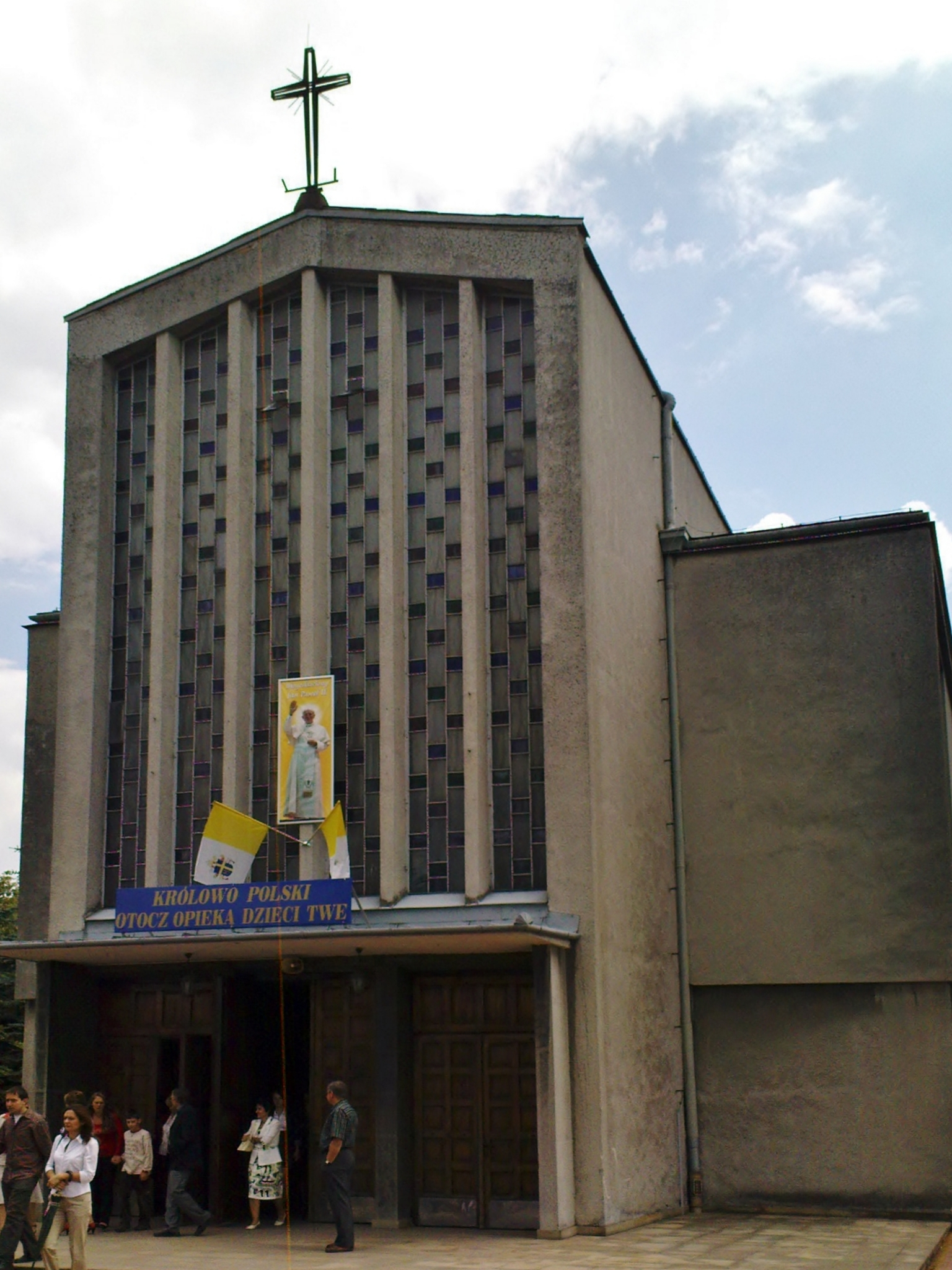
- Catholic church

- Location within Poland
- Coordinates: 50°0′N 20°10′E
- Country: Poland
- Voivodeship: Lesser Poland
- County: Wieliczka
- Gmina: Niepołomice
- Population: 1,924

Podłęże [pɔdˈwɛ̃ʐɛ] is a village in the administrative district of Gmina Niepołomice, within Wieliczka County, Lesser Poland Voivodeship, in southern Poland.
