= Locomotives of the North British Railway =

The North British Railway was opened in 1846 as the line from Edinburgh to Berwick-upon-Tweed, and its workshops were initially situated in St. Margarets, Edinburgh. Gradually other railways were acquired, including in 1865 the Edinburgh and Glasgow Railway, whose works at Cowlairs, Glasgow were better than that at St. Margarets, which were reduced to repairs only and all production moved to Cowlairs.

As is customary, engine classes are organized according to the man who was locomotive superintendent when the class was introduced, and to whom the design is often attributed. The NBR was rather unfortunate in its choice of locomotive superintendents, the first five of whom were sacked or forced to resign either for alleged incompetence or financial scandals.

The NBR's locomotive classification system (introduced in 1913) is not very helpful because the same letter has been applied to several different classes. The North British Railway Study Group has developed its own classification system and a list can be found here.

These are not complete lists, as most engines acquired second-hand and from absorbed companies are not included.

== Robert Thornton (1846–51) ==
Numbers	Wheel arrangement	Number built	Builder	Date	Notes
1–16	0-4-2	16	R & W Hawthorn	1846	Original NBR locomotive order (on formation). 10 locomotives for passenger services. One rebuilt in 1857 as 2-2-2
17–26	0-4-2	10	R & W Hawthorn	1846	Original NBR locomotive order (on formation). 6 locomotives for freight services. One rebuilt in 1859 as 2-2-2, 2 in 1867-8 as 0-6-0T
27–32	0-6-0	6	R & W Hawthorn	1846	Original NBR locomotive order (on formation). 6 locomotives for heavy coal freight services.
33–38	2-2-2	6	R & W Hawthorn	1847	Two rebuilt 1868–69 as 2-4-0
39–46	2-4-0	8	R & W Hawthorn	1847	Two rebuilt 1868-70 as 0-6-0
47–54	0-6-0	8	R & W Hawthorn	1848	
55	4-2-0	1	E. B. Wilson & Co.	1849	Crampton locomotive. Later rebuilt as 2-2-2
57	2-2-2	1	R & W Hawthorn	1849	
56, 58–63	2-4-0	7	R & W Hawthorn	1851	
64–71	0-6-0	8	R & W Hawthorn	1850	

== William Smith (1851–54) ==
No new locomotives were built during his term of office.

== Edmund George Petrie (1854) ==
No new locomotives were built during his term of office.

== William Hurst (1855–66) ==
Hurst came from the Lancashire & Yorkshire Railway, to which he returned after being sacked from the NBR.

There were many variations within the classes listed here, both as built and after subsequent rebuilding.

1st built	Wheel arrangement	Number built	Builder	Date	Notes
72	0-4-2	4	W. Fairbairn	1855	Originally intended for Lancashire & Yorkshire Railway
90	2-4-0	24	Neilson (18); Dübs (6)	1861–68	
109	0-4-0	3	NBR St. Margarets	1865–66	
76	0-6-0	4	NBR St. Margarets	1860–61	
80	0-6-0	58	Hawthorn of Leith (6); R. Stephenson (16); Dübs & Co. (36)	1861–67	
31	2-2-2WT	2	NBR St. Margarets	1856	1877 sold to Wigtownshire Railway
20	0-4-2WT	14	NBR St. Margarets	1857–64	
282	0-6-0ST	3	Dübs	1866–67	

== Thomas Wheatley (1867–74) ==
1st built	1913 Class	Wheel arrangement	Number built	Builder	Date	LNER Class	Notes
141	—	2-4-0	2	NBR Cowlairs	1869	—	
418	P	2-4-0	8	NBR Cowlairs	1873	E7	
40	—	2-4-0	2	NBR Cowlairs	1873	—	
224	—	4-4-0	2	NBR Cowlairs	1871	—	
420	—	4-4-0	4	NBR Cowlairs	1873	—	
17	—	0-6-0	1	NBR St. Margarets	1868	—	Built from parts of earlier locos
251	E	0-6-0	38	NBR Cowlairs	1867–74	J84	20 rebuilt as saddle-tanks from 1889–94
396	E	0-6-0	26	Neilson & Co. (12), Dübs & Co. (14)	1867–69	J31	
56	—	0-6-0	8	NBR St. Margarets	1868–69	—	"Longback" class.
115	E	0-6-0	62	NBR Cowlairs	1869–75	J31	
226	E	0-6-0ST	2	NBR Cowlairs	1870	J86	
220	—	0-6-0ST	1	NBR Cowlairs	1870	—	
130	E	0-6-0ST	9	NBR Cowlairs	1870–73	J85	
229	E	0-6-0ST	15	NBR Cowlairs	1871–73	J81	
32	—	0-6-0ST	6	NBR Cowlairs	1874	—	
394	—	0-4-0	2	Neilson & Co.	1867	—	Second hand
357	—	0-4-0	2	NBR Cowlairs	1868	Y10	
18	—	0-4-0ST	2	NBR Cowlairs	1872	—	

== Dugald Drummond (1874–82) ==
1st built	1913 Class	Wheel arrangement	Number built	Builder	Date	LNER Class	Notes
474	—	2-2-2	2	Neilson	1876	—	Sometimes designated "Berwick" class, after the name of locomotive 475. Two built, for Edinburgh-Glasgow express services.
476	M	4-4-0	12	Neilson (8); NBR Cowlairs (4)	1877–79	D27/D28	"Abbotsford" class.
494	P	4-4-0T	3	Neilson	1879	D50	
72	R	4-4-0T	30	NBR Cowlairs	1880–84	D51	
157	P	0-4-2T	6	NBR Cowlairs	1877	G8	All rebuilt as 0-4-4T in 1881
100	C	0-6-0	32	NBR Cowlairs (12); Neilson (20)	1876–77	J32	
34	D	0-6-0	13	NBR Cowlairs	1879	J34	"Wee Drummond" class.
497	D	0-6-0	88	NBR Cowlairs (83); Dübs (5)	1879–83	J34	"Wee Drummond" class.
165	R	0-6-0T	25	NBR Cowlairs	1875–78	J82	
546	G	0-4-0ST	2	Neilson	1882	Y9	

== Matthew Holmes (1882–1903) ==
1st built	1913 Class	Wheel arrangement	Number built	Builder	Date	LNER Class	Notes
574	M	4-4-0	6	NBR Cowlairs	1884	D31	
633	M	4-4-0	24	NBR Cowlairs	1890–95	D31	
729	M	4-4-0	18	NBR Cowlairs	1898–99	D31	
592	N	4-4-0	12	NBR Cowlairs	1886–87	D25	
693	N	4-4-0	24	NBR Cowlairs	1894–96	D35	"West Highland Bogie" class. One superheated in 1919, became NBR L class / LNER Class D36.
317	K	4-4-0	12	NBR Cowlairs	1903	D26	
586	P	0-4-4T	12	NBR Cowlairs	1886–88	G7	
566	D	0-6-0	36	NBR Cowlairs	1883–87	J33	
604	C	0-6-0	168	Neilson (15), Sharp Stewart (15), NBR Cowlairs (138)	1888–1900	J36	673 Maude preserved
795	D	0-6-0T	40	Neilson (20), Sharp Stewart (20)	1900–01	J83	
32	G	0-4-0ST	36	NBR Cowlairs	1887–99	Y9	same as Drummond 546 class. Of this batch, NBR 42 was preserved.

== William Paton Reid (1903–19) ==
NBL (the North British Locomotive Company) was a private locomotive manufacturer, distinct from the North British Railway.

1st built	1913 Class	Wheel arrangement	Number built	Builder	Date	LNER Class	Notes
868	H	4-4-2	22	NBL (16); R. Stephenson (6)	1906–21	C11	Commonly known as the "North British Atlantics". Final two built with superheaters. Superheaters added to all others 1915–25. (Those which remained saturated were briefly designated class I or LNER class C10, but all were superheated by 1925 and became class C11.) The largest and most powerful locomotives ever built by the NBR.
1	M	4-4-2T	30	Yorkshire Engine Co.	1911–13	C15	
438	L	4-4-2T	21	NBL	1915–21	C16	Superheated
895	J	4-4-0	16	NBL (6); NBR Cowlairs (10)	1909–11	D29	"Scott" class. Superheaters added 1925–35
400	J	4-4-0	27	NBR Cowlairs	1912–20	D30	"Scott" class. Superheated.
882	K	4-4-0	12	NBR Cowlairs	1906–07	D32	Superheaters added 1923–26
331	K	4-4-0	12	NBR Cowlairs	1909–10	D33	Superheaters added 1925–36
149	K	4-4-0	32	NBR Cowlairs	1913–20	D34	"Glen" class. Superheated. 256/9256/2469/62469 Glen Douglas preserved.
239	M	0-4-4T	12	NBL	1909	G9	
848	B	0-6-0	76	NBL (40); NBR Cowlairs (36)	1906–13	J35	
8	S	0-6-0	104	NBR Cowlairs (35); NBL (69)	1914–21	J37	Superheated
836	F	0-6-0T	35	NBR Cowlairs	1905–19	J88	
858	A	0-6-2T	6	NBL	1909–20	N14	
7	A	0-6-2T	69	NBL	1910–24	N15	+30 built by LNER

== Walter Chalmers (1919–22) ==
All previous incumbents were known as Locomotive Superintendent. Chalmers held the same position, but with the title changed to Chief Mechanical Engineer.

There were no new locomotive designs during the incumbency of Walter Chalmers as Chief Mechanical Engineer. Two new NBR H class locomotives were built under his supervision. Although these were not his design, he had drawn the designs under the direction of W P Reid, having been Chief Draughtsman (the deputy to the Locomotive Superintendent) of the NBR whilst Reid was Locomotive Superintendent.

== Locomotive nicknames ==
As with most companies, certain classes of locomotive from the North British Railway were commonly known by distinctive names or nicknames, rather than their official class designations. The following is a guide to these nicknames, with links to articles about the respective locomotive types.

Common nickname	NBR designation	LNER designation	Wheel arrangement	Design date	Notes
Longback	-	-	0-6-0	1868	Withdrawn before any standard class designation system was introduced.
Berwick	-	-	2-2-2	1876	Withdrawn before any standard class designation system was introduced.
Eighteen Incher	C class	J32 class	0-6-0	1876	673 Maude preserved.
Abbotsford	M class	D27 & D28 class	4-4-0	1877	
Wee Drummond	D class	J34 class	0-6-0	1879	
Pug	G class	Y9 class	0-4-0ST	1882	42 preserved.
West Highland Bogie	N class	D35 class	4-4-0	1894	
North British Atlantic	H class	C11 class	4-4-2	1906	
Scott	J class	D29 class	4-4-0	1909	
Superheated Scott or Super Scott	J class	D30 class	4-4-0	1912	
Glen	K class	D34 class	4-4-0	1913	256 Glen Douglas preserved.

== Preserved locomotives ==
Image	NBR No.	NBR Class	Type	Manufacturer	Serial No.	Date	Notes
	42	G Class	0-4-0ST	Cowlairs railway works		1887	On static display at the Bo'ness and Kinneil Railway
	673	C Class	0-6-0	Neilson and Company	4392	1891	On static display at the Bo'ness and Kinneil Railway
	256	K Class	4-4-0	Cowlairs railway works		1913	On static display at the Riverside Museum
