= NBR S class =

Class of British 0-6-0 steam locomotives

NBR S Class LNER Class J37
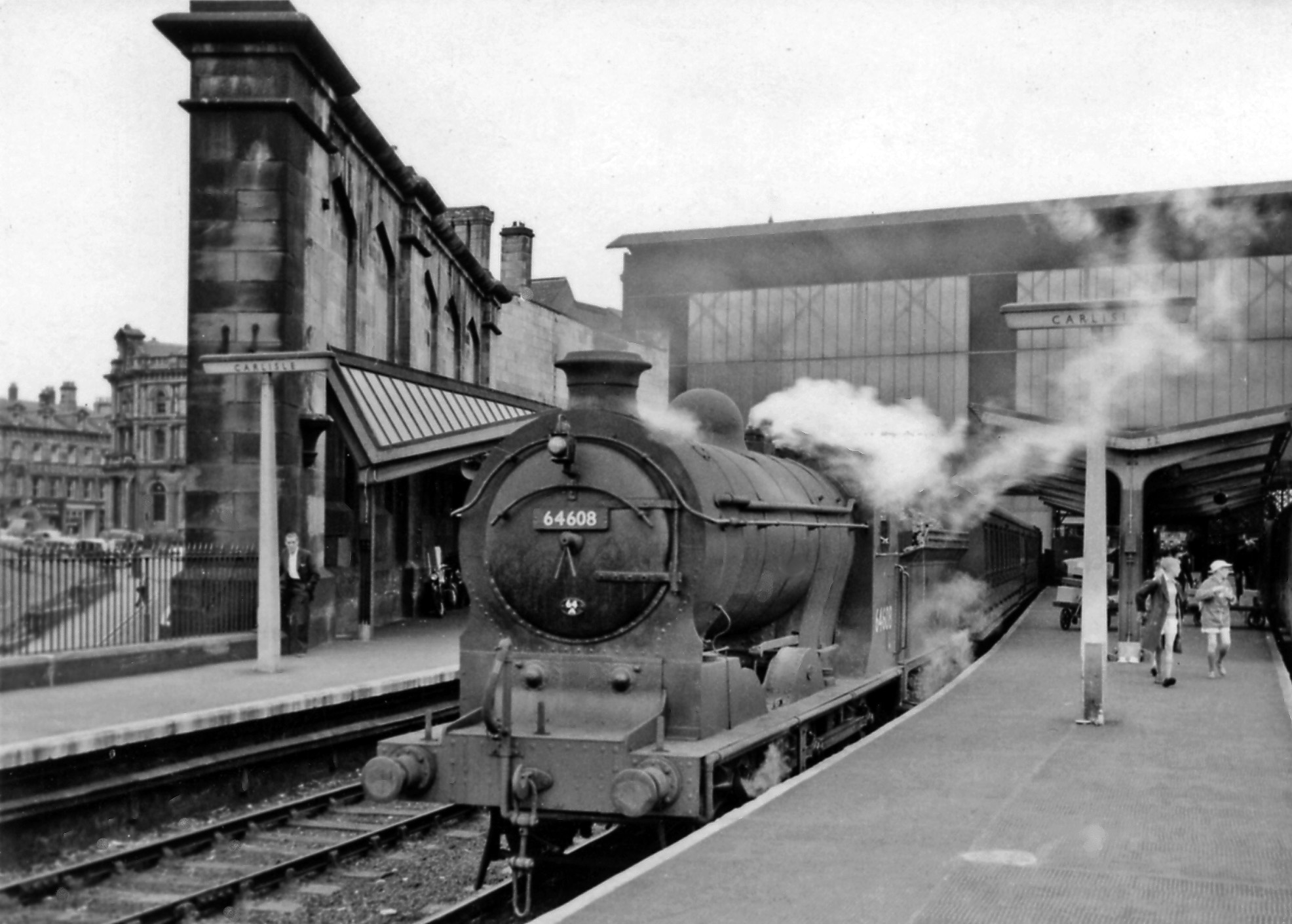
- J37 No. 64608 at Carlisle (Citadel)1960
Type and origin
- Power type: Steam
- Designer: William Paton Reid
- Builder: Cowlairs railway works North British Locomotive Co.
- Build date: 1914-1921
- Total produced: 104
Specifications
- Configuration
  - Whyte: 0-6-0
- Gauge: 4 ft 8 1/2 in (1,435 mm)
- Driver dia.: 5 ft 0 in (1.524 m)
- Length: 54 ft 5 1/2 in (16.599 m)
- Loco weight: 54 long tons 14 cwt (122,500 lb or 55.6 t)
- Fuel type: Coal
- Boiler pressure: 180 lbf/in^{2} (1.24 MPa)
- Cylinders: Two, inside
- Cylinder size: 19.5 in × 26 in (495 mm × 660 mm)
- Valve gear: Stephenson
Performance figures
- Tractive effort: 25,210 lbf (112.14 kN)
Career
- Operators: North British Railway; London and North Eastern Railway; British Railways
- Power class: NBR/LNER: 4F; BR: 5F
- Withdrawn: 1959-1967
- Disposition: All scrapped

The NBR S Class (LNER Class J37) was a class of 0-6-0 steam locomotive designed by William Paton Reid for freight work on the North British Railway. The engines were initially designated as B class, being a development of the standard B class locomotives designed by Reid some eight years previously, and represented the culmination of a long evolution on the NBR of powerful 0-6-0 freight engines. The new locomotives were introduced in 1914 and had superheaters, inside cylinders and piston valves operated by Stephenson valve gear.

== Design evolution ==
The North British had built large numbers of 0-6-0 freight engines of earlier classes, and during the incumbency of Matthew Holmes these reached his highly numerous C class design, consisting of 200 locomotives in total (168 of his own engines, later designated LNER class J36, plus 32 rebuilt from the highly similar 1876 design by Dugald Drummond, later designated LNER class J32).

Reid set out to develop this design, and improve upon it, producing the standard NBR B class (later LNER class J35), of which 76 examples were built. They were larger and heavier than the earlier engines, and in common with Reid's common practice, had a high boiler pitch.

In 1914, Reid ordered the first batch of 5 engines of his improved B class design. From 1914 to 1919, these engines were simply considered to be part of the B class, by which time around 70 had been produced. However, with a new batch ordered in 1919 Reid made several minor alterations, including an increase in working boiler pressure from 165 psi to 175 psi. These engines, together with all subsequent batches, were given a new designation, as S class. Several of the earlier locomotives were upgraded to the new 175 psi boiler pressure, and redesignated as S class. Finally, upon Grouping in 1923, the LNER upgraded all of the S class engines and all of the improved B class engines, to a working boiler pressure of 180 psi, and formally grouped them all together into the J37 class. The improved B class J37s and the S class J37s together totalled 104 engines.

== Numbering ==
A total of 104 locomotives was built by the North British Railway, all of which passed to the London and North Eastern Railway (LNER) in 1923, and all of which came into British Railways (BR) ownership at nationalisation in 1948. BR numbers were 64536–64639.

== Performance ==
The improved B class (J37) and S class (J37) locomotives performed admirably on fast mainline freight services, and heavy Fife coal trains. On some parts of the network (notably the West Highland Line), they were used for both freight and passenger duties. The engines have been described as being the most successful and the most powerful 0-6-0 tender engines ever employed in Scotland.

== Preservation ==
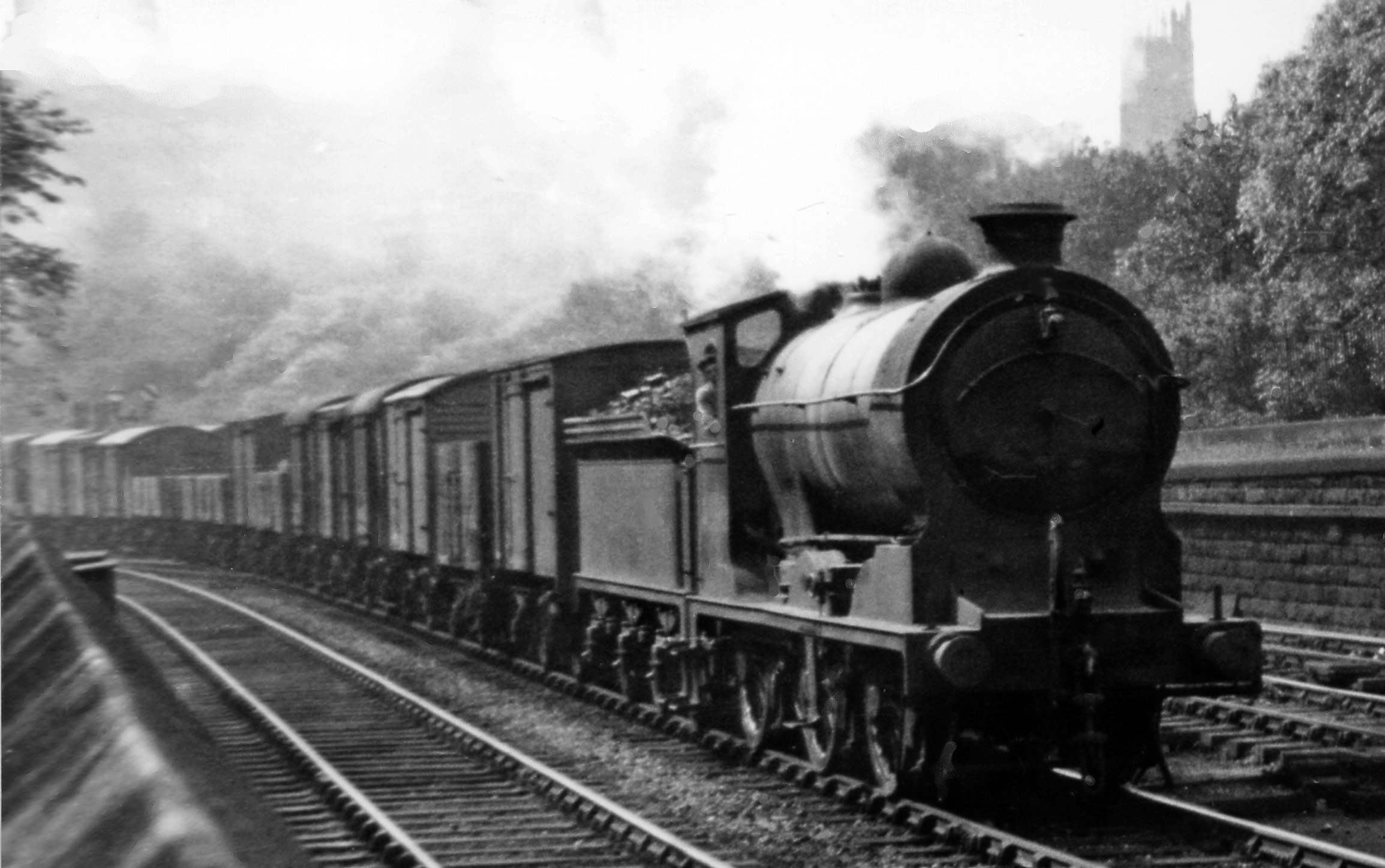
Number 4592 approaching Edinburgh Waverley railway station in August 1948.

All members of both the B and S classes were scrapped after withdrawal, the last of which being in 1962 and 1967 respectively.
