= NBR J class =

Class of British 4-4-0 steam locomotives

NBR J Class LNER Classes D29 & D30
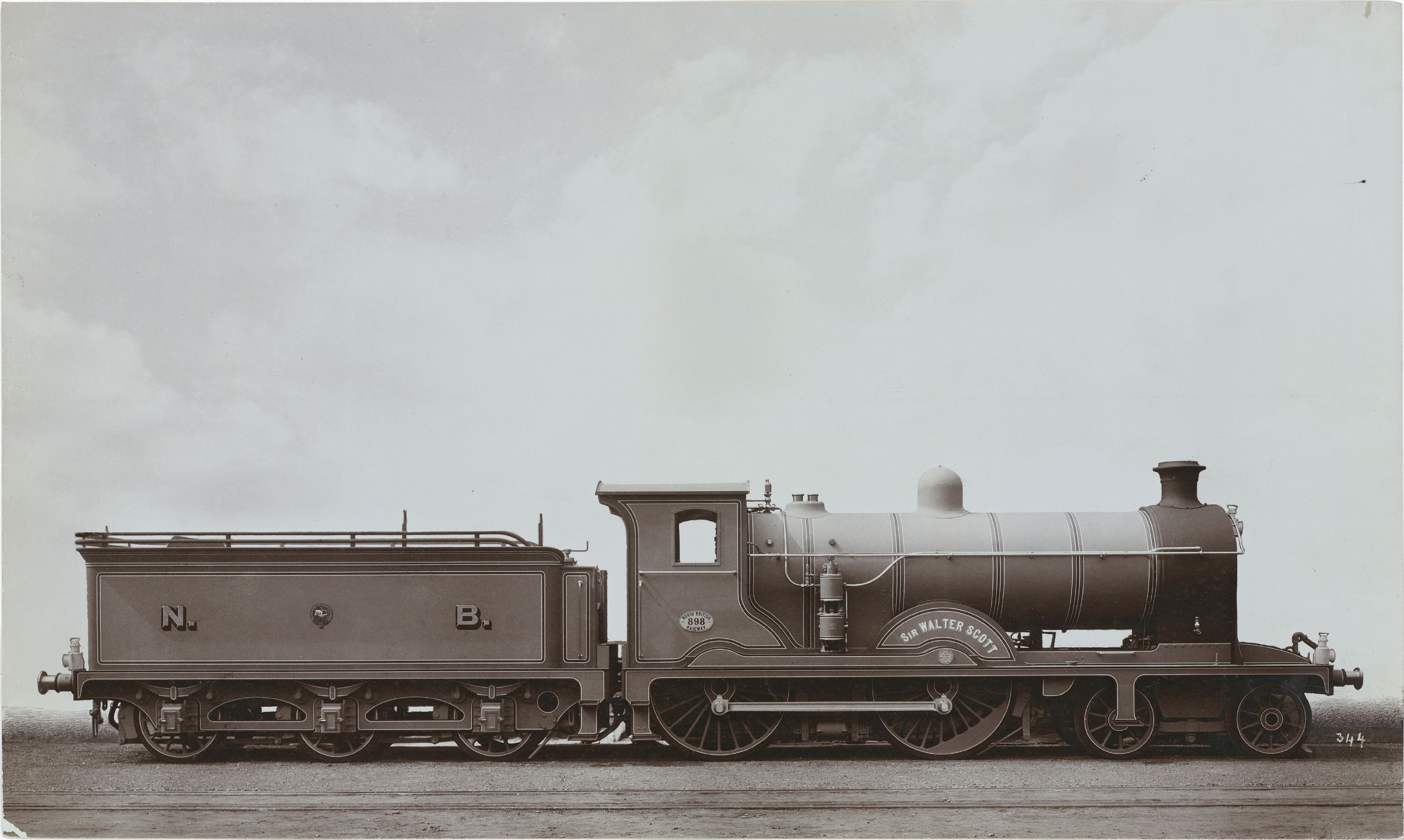
Type and origin
- Power type: Steam
- Designer: William P. Reid
- Builder: North British Locomotive Company and NBR Cowlairs Works
- Build date: 1909-1920
- Total produced: 43 locomotives (16 type D29 & 27 type D30)
Specifications
- Configuration
  - Whyte: 4-4-0
- Gauge: 4 ft 8 1/2 in (1,435 mm)
- Leading dia.: 3 ft 6 in (1.07 m)
- Driver dia.: 6 ft 6 in (1.98 m)
- Length: 46 ft 8.5 in (14.24 m)
- Height: 13 ft 0 in (3.96 m)
- Axle load: 18.4 long tons (18.7 t)
- Loco weight: 54.8 long tons (55.7 t) D29, 57.3 long tons (58.2 t) D30/1, 57.8 long tons (58.7 t) D30/2
- Tender weight: 46.0 long tons (46.7 t)
- Fuel type: coal
- Firebox
  - Grate area: 21.13 square feet (1.963 m^{2})
- Boiler: 5 ft 0 in (1.52 m) diameter
- Boiler pressure: 190 psi (1.3 MPa) D29, 165 psi (1.14 MPa) D30
- Heating surface
  - Firebox: 139.7 square feet (12.98 m^{2})
  - Tubes: 1,478.3 square feet (137.34 m^{2}) D29, 871.3 square feet (80.95 m^{2}) D30/1; 677.0 square feet (62.90 m^{2}) D30/2
- Cylinders: 2
- Cylinder size: 19 in × 26 in (480 mm × 660 mm) D29, 20 in × 26 in (510 mm × 660 mm) D30
- Valve gear: Stephenson
Performance figures
- Tractive effort: 19,434 lbf (86.45 kN) D29; 18,700 lbf (83 kN) D30
Career
- Operators: NBR, LNER, BR
- Class: NBR J; LNER D29 and D30
- Power class: BR: 3P
- Numbers: 243-245, 338-340, 359-363, 400, 409-428, 497-501, 895-899, 990
- Nicknames: Scott class
- Retired: 1945-1960
- Disposition: All engines scrapped

The NBR J Class (LNER Classes D29 & D30), commonly known as the Scott class, were a class of 4-4-0 steam tender locomotives designed by William P. Reid for the North British Railway. They passed to the London and North Eastern Railway at the grouping in 1923. Forty-three were built, of which thirty-five (ten D29s and twenty-five D30s) survived into British Railways ownership in 1948.

== Overview ==
The original J Class locomotives were based on the NBR K Class mixed traffic 4-4-0s. The J Class had 6' 6" driving wheels for express passenger work and a large tender which carried sufficient water to allow passenger trains to run non-stop between Edinburgh and Carlisle. These locomotives were named after characters in the novels of Sir Walter Scott and naturally became known as "Scotts". Some of the names were later re-used on LNER Peppercorn Class A1 locomotives.

== Builders ==
Six locomotives were built in 1909 by the North British Locomotive Company and a further ten were built in 1911 by the North British Railway at its Cowlairs railway works, followed by two further identical locomotives with superheaters. The NBR always referred to these locomotives as J Class, but the LNER classified the initial 16 locomotives D29, and the two superheated locomotives as D30. A further 25 superheated locomotives were built between 1914 and 1920 and the LNER classified these as D30/2.

== Accidents and incidents ==
- On 3 January 1917, locomotive No. 421 Jingling Geordie overran signals and was in a head-on collision with an express passenger train at Ratho, Lothian. 12 people were killed and 44 were seriously injured. Irregular operating procedures were a major contributory factor in the accident. These were subsequently stopped.
- On 10 December 1937, No. 9896 Dandie Dinmont was hauling a Dundee to Glasgow Queen Street express train when it was involved in an accident at Castlecary, North Lanarkshire. The train was running late in whiteout conditions when it overran a red home signal at Castlecary. There was no collision with the freight train at Dullatur East, but believing that the train was entering the next section, the signalman sent another express train, hauled by LNER Class A3 4-6-2 No. 2744 Grand Parade, into the section. Minutes later, Grand Parade plowed into the back of the first express. 35 people were killed and another 179 people were injured.

== Numbers and names ==
British Railways numbers were:

- D29, 62401-62413 (with gaps)
- D30, 62417-62442 (62433 missing)

Built	Class	NBR no.	Name	LNER 1st no.	LNER 2nd no.	BR no.	Withdrawn
1909	D29	895	Rob Roy	9895	2400	(62400)	1948
1909	D29	896	Dandie Dinmont	9896	2401	(62401)	1949
1909	D29	897	Redgauntlet	9897	2402	(62402)	1949
1909	D29	898	Sir Walter Scott	9898	2403	(62403)	1948
1909	D29	899	Jeanie Deans	9899	2404	(62404)	1949
1909	D29	900	The Fair Maid	9900	2405	62405	1951
1911	D29	243	Meg Merrilies	9243	2406	(62406)	1949
1911	D29	244	Madge Wildfire	9244	2407		1947
1911	D29	245	Bailie Nicol Jarvie	9245	2408		1947
1911	D29	338	Helen MacGregor	9338	2409	(62409)	1948
1911	D29	339	Ivanhoe	9339	2410	62410	1952
1911	D29	340	Lady of Avenel	9340	2411	62411	1952
1911	D29	359	Dirk Hatteraick	9359	2412	62412	1950
1911	D29	360	Guy Mannering	9360	2413	62413	1950
1911	D29	361	Vich Ian Vohr	9361	(2414)		1946
1911	D29	362	Ravenswood	9362	2415		1947
1912	D30/1	400	The Dougal Cratur	9400	(2416)		1945
1912	D30/1	363	Hal o' the Wynd	9363	2417	62417	1951
1914	D30/2	409	The Pirate	9409	2418	62418	1959
1914	D30/2	410	Meg Dods	9410	2419	62419	1957
1914	D30/2	411	Dominie Sampson	9411	2420	62420	1957
1914	D30/2	412	Laird o' Monkbarns	9412	2421	62421	1960
1914	D30/2	413	Caleb Balderstone	9413	2422	62422	1958
1914	D30/2	414	Dugald Dalgetty	9414	2423	62423	1957
1914	D30/2	415	Claverhouse	9415	2424	62424	1957
1914	D30/2	416	Ellangowan	9416	2425	62425	1958
1914	D30/2	417	Cuddie Headrigg	9417	2426	62426	1960
1914	D30/2	418	Dumbiedykes	9418	2427	62427	1959
1914	D30/2	419	The Talisman	9419	2428	62428	1958
1914	D30/2	420	The Abbot	9420	2429	62429	1957
1914	D30/2	421	Jingling Geordie	9421	2430	62430	1957
1914	D30/2	422	Kenilworth	9422	2431	62431	1958
1914	D30/2	423	Quentin Durward	9423	2432	62432	1958
1915	D30/2	424	Lady Rowena	9424	2433		1947
1915	D30/2	425	Kettledrummle	9425	2434	62434	1958
1915	D30/2	426	Norna	9426	2435	62435	1957
1915	D30/2	427	Lord Glenvarloch	9427	2436	62436	1959
1915	D30/2	428	Adam Woodcock	9428	2437	62437	1958
1920	D30/2	497	Peter Poundtext	9497	2438	62438	1957
1920	D30/2	498	Father Ambrose	9498	2439	62439	1959
1920	D30/2	499	Wandering Willie	9499	2440	62440	1958
1920	D30/2	500	Black Duncan	9500	2441	62441	1958
1920	D30/2	501	Simon Glover	9501	2442	62442	1958

NBR no. 898 was named after Sir Walter Scott the author of the Waverley Novels, and the others were given the names either of those novels, or of characters and places in them. The LNER increased the NBR numbers by 9000, and these were applied between 1924 and 1926. New LNER numbers were allotted in 1943 in the order of construction, but the locos were not renumbered until 1946, by which time two had been withdrawn. British Railways increased the LNER 1946 numbers by 60000 between 1948 and 1950, but some were withdrawn before this could be carried out. Numbers in parentheses were allocated but not carried.
