= NBR F class =

Class of tank locomotives by William P. Ried

NBR F Class LNER Class J88
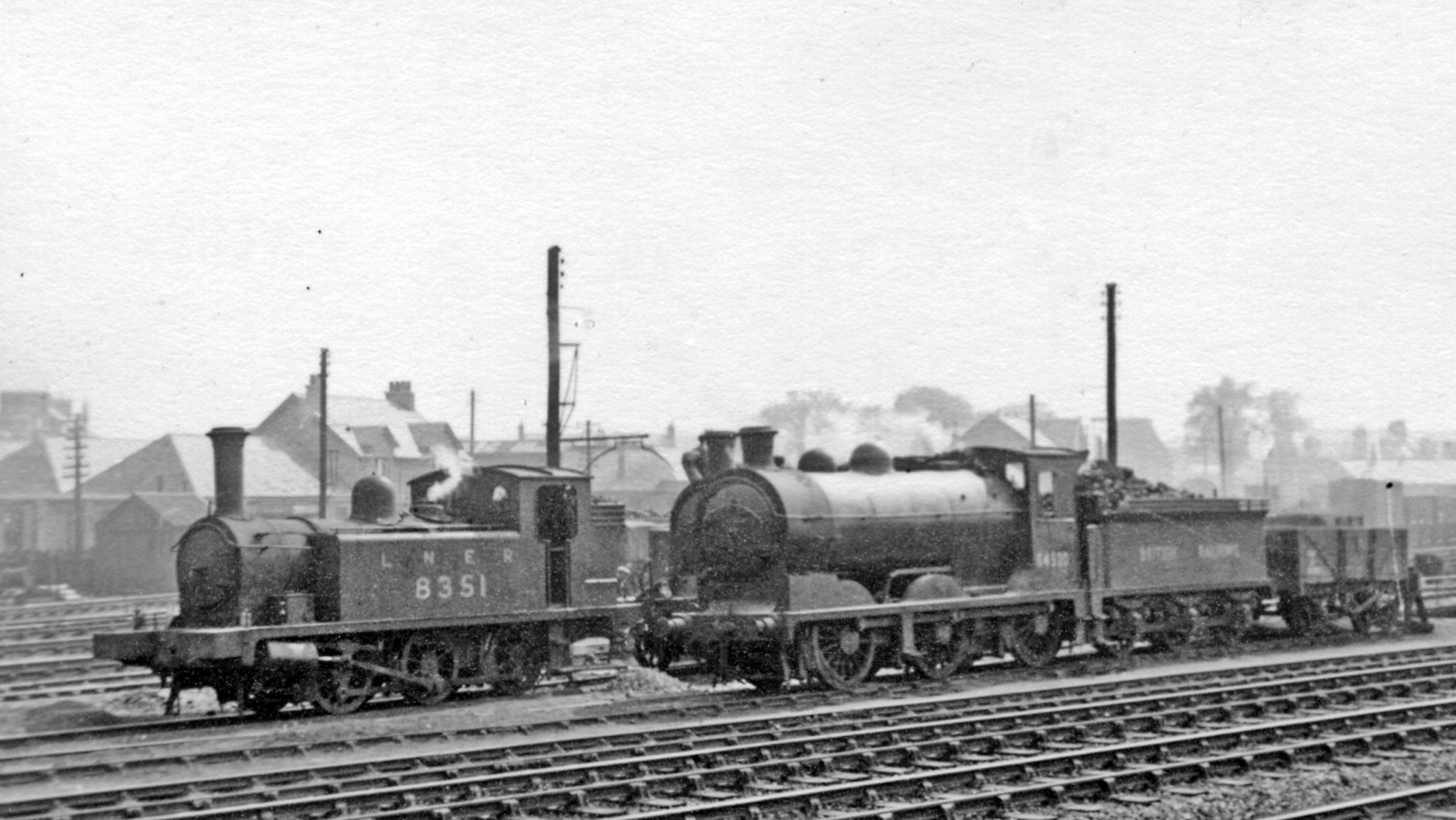
- BR 68351 (still in LNER guise as 8351) (left) in steam at Shore Road Depot 28 August 1948
Type and origin
- Power type: Steam
- Designer: William P. Reid
- Builder: NBR Cowlairs Works
- Build date: 1904–1919
- Total produced: 35
Specifications
- Configuration
  - Whyte: 0-6-0T
  - UIC: C n2t
- Gauge: 4 ft 8 1/2 in (1,435 mm)
- Driver dia.: 3 ft 9 in (1.143 m)
- Wheelbase: 11 ft 0 in (3.35 m)
  - Axle spacing (Asymmetrical): 5 ft 3 in (1.60 m) +; 5 ft 9 in (1.75 m)
- Length: 27 ft 6 3/4 in (8.40 m) over buffers
- Axle load: 15 LT 12 cwt (15.9 t)
- Loco weight: 38 LT 14 cwt (39.3 t) (full)
- Fuel type: Coal
- Fuel capacity: 2 long tons 1 cwt (2.1 t)
- Water cap.: 850 imp gal (3,900 L; 1,020 US gal)
- Firebox
  - Grate area: 14.5 sq ft (1.35 m^{2})
- Boiler
  - Model: LNER diagram 87
  - Pitch: 6 ft 6 1/2 in (1.994 m)
  - Tube plates: 8 ft 8 1/2 in (2.654 m)
  - Small tubes: 142 × 1 3/4 in (44 mm)
- Boiler pressure: 130 lbf/in^{2} (0.90 MPa)
- Heating surface
  - Firebox: 65.7 sq ft (6.10 m^{2})
  - Tubes: 585.5 sq ft (54.39 m^{2})
  - Total surface: 651.2 sq ft (60.50 m^{2})
- Superheater: None
- Cylinders: Two, outside
- Cylinder size: 15 in × 22 in (381 mm × 559 mm)
- Valve gear: Stephenson
- Valve type: Slide valves
Performance figures
- Tractive effort: 12,155 lbf (54.07 kN)
Career
- Operators: North British Railway; London and North Eastern Railway; British Railways
- Power class: BR: 0F
- Axle load class: LNER: RA 3
- Locale: Scotland
- Withdrawn: 1954–1962
- Disposition: All scrapped

The NBR F Class (LNER Class J88) was a class of 0-6-0 tank locomotives, designed by William P. Reid on the North British Railway. They were used for dockyard shunting duties.

== Background ==
When the North British railway required more dock shunting tank locomotives in 1904, rather than order further copies of the railway's standard G class (LNER class Y9) 0-4-0ST, William P. Reid introduced a completely new 0-6-0T locomotive design.

== Design ==
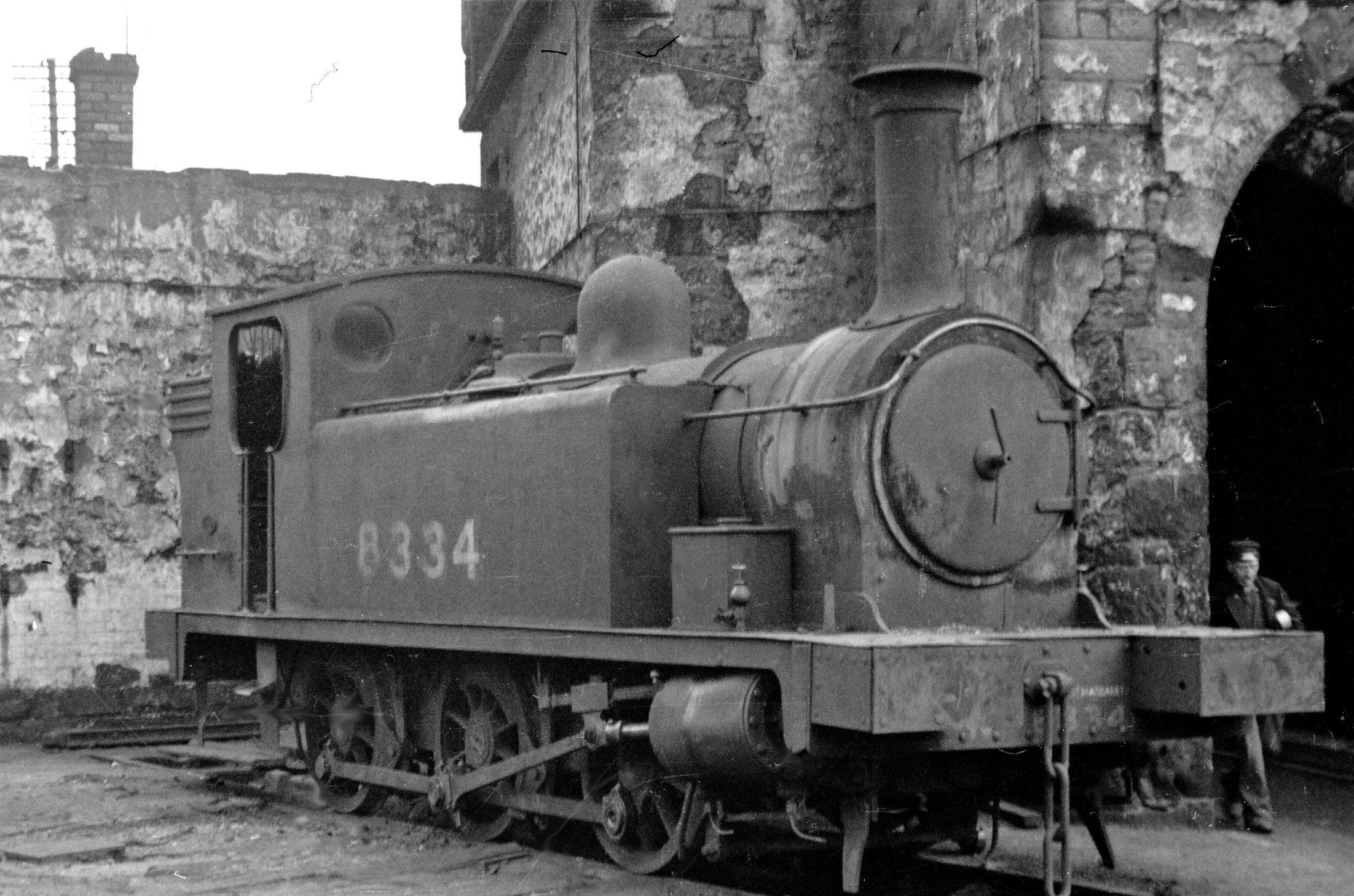
unknown lner j88 at st margarets locomotive depot

The class had a 3-foot-10-inch (1.17 m) diameter, 10-foot-5-inch (3.18 m) long boiler producing 130 pounds-force per square inch (0.90 MPa) saturated steam to two outside 17-by-24-inch (432 mm × 610 mm) cylinders, which were connected to the 3-foot-9-inch (1.143 m) driving wheels by inside Stephenson valve gear actuating slide valves.

== Construction ==
All thirty five locomotives were built at the NBR's Cowlairs Works in five batches between 1904 and 1919.

Table of orders and numbers
Year	Quantity	NBR No.	LNER No.	LNER 1946 No.
1904–05	6	836–841	9836–9841	8320–8325
1905	6	842–847	9842–9847	8326–8331
1909	6	233–238	9233–9238	8332–8337
1912	10	66, 114, 116–119, 121, 130, 132, 152	9066, 9114, 9116–9119, 9121, 91309, 9132, 9152	8338–8347
1919	7	277, 290, 288–289, 87, 271, 279	9277, 9290, 9288–9289, 9087, 9271, 9279	8348–8349, 8353–8354, 8350–8352

== Service history ==
They were used on docks and harbours on both the east and west coasts of Scotland. They were usually allocated to St. Margaret's (Edinburgh), Eastfield (Glasgow), Thornton, Kipps, Polmont, Stirling and Haymarket (Edinburgh) locomotive depots.

At the grouping in 1923, they all passed to the London and North Eastern Railway, who classified them as class J88. They were all still in service at Nationalisation in 1948. BR added 60000 to their LNER 1946 number.

== Withdrawal ==
One locomotive, No. 68341, was withdrawn in 1954 after falling into Kirkcaldy harbour, but later the class were gradually displaced by diesel shunters during the 1950s, with the last withdrawn in December 1962. All members of the class were scrapped, and there is no surviving example in preservation.

Table of withdrawals
Year	Quantity in service at start of year	Quantity withdrawn	Locomotive numbers
1954	35	1	68341
1955	34	1	68337
1956	33	1	68323
1957	32	1	68351
1958	31	11	68321, 68322, 68324, 68327, 68328, 68330, 68333, 68339, 68340, 68347, 68348
1959	20	4	68326, 68329, 68331, 68334
1960	16	6	68320, 68332, 68343, 68349, 68354, 68352
1961	10	3	68325, 68338, 68344
1962	7	7	63335, 68336, 68342, 68345, 68346, 68350, 68353
