= NBR C Class =

Class of 168 British 0-6-0 locomotives

NBR C Class LNER Class J36 & J32
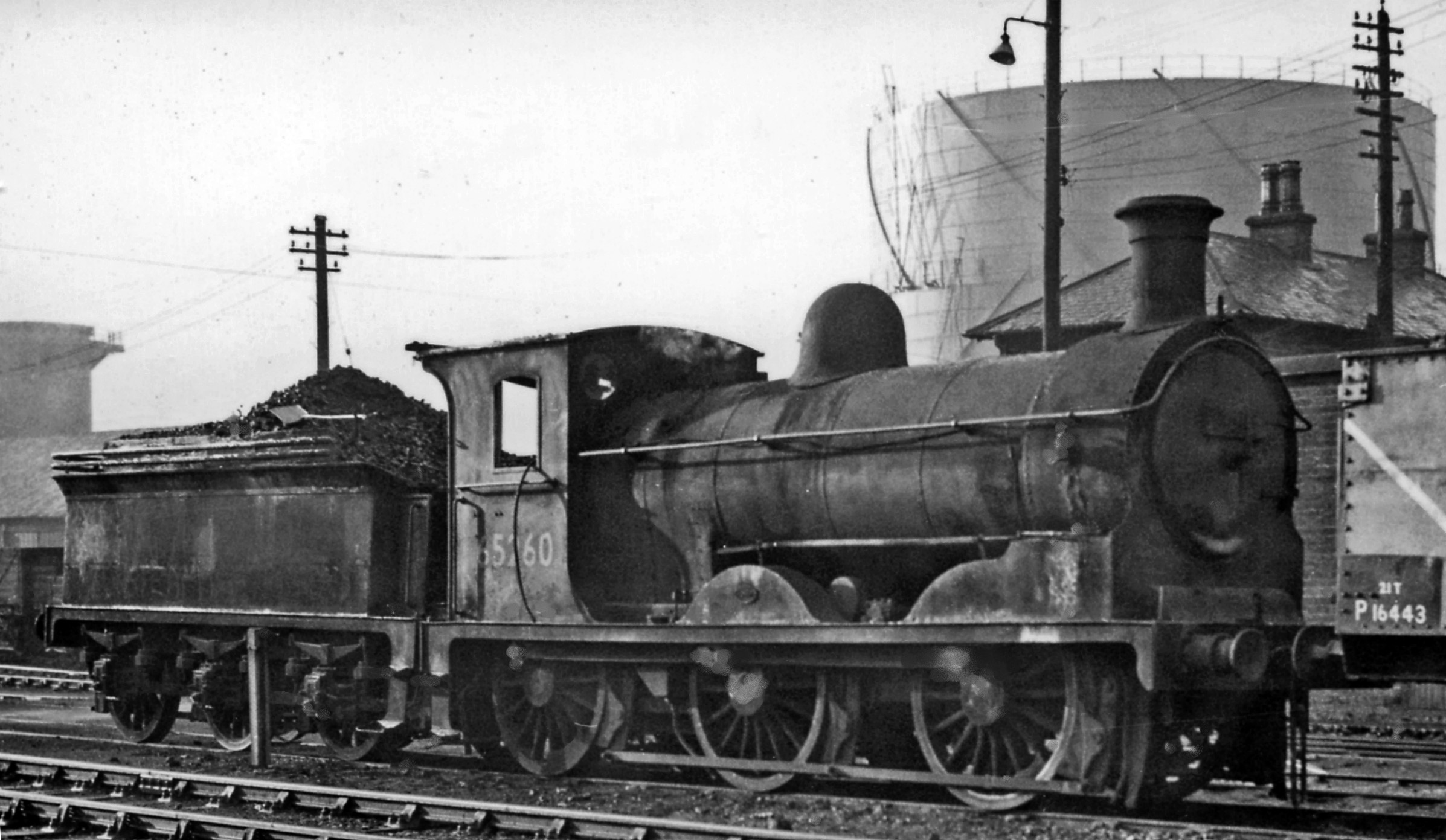
- 65260 at Kipps Locomotive Depot
Type and origin
- Power type: Steam
- Designer: Matthew Holmes
- Builder: NBR Cowlairs Works (138), Neilson and Company (15), Sharp, Stewart and Company (15)
- Build date: 1888–1901
- Total produced: 200; 168 (J36) + 32 (J32)
Specifications
- Configuration
  - Whyte: 0-6-0
- Gauge: 4 ft 8 1/2 in (1,435 mm)
- Driver dia.: 5 ft 0 in (1.524 m)
- Length: Unrebuilt: 49 ft 0 1/2 in (14.948 m); Rebuilt: 49 ft 2 in (14.99 m)
- Axle load: 15 long tons 15 cwt (35,300 lb or 16 t)
- Loco weight: 41 long tons 19 cwt (94,000 lb or 42.6 t)
- Tender weight: 33 long tons 9 cwt (74,900 lb or 34 t)
- Fuel type: Coal
- Boiler pressure: 165 lbf/in^{2} (1.14 MPa)
- Cylinders: Two, inside
- Cylinder size: 18 in × 26 in (457 mm × 660 mm)
- Valve gear: Stephenson
Performance figures
- Tractive effort: 19,690 lbf (87.59 kN)
Career
- Operators: North British Railway; London and North Eastern Railway; British Railways
- Power class: BR: 2F
- Nicknames: Eighteen inchers
- Withdrawn: 1926–1967
- Disposition: One J36 preserved, remainder scrapped. All J32 locomotives scrapped.

The NBR C Class (LNER Class J36) is a class of 0-6-0 steam locomotives designed by Matthew Holmes for freight work on the North British Railway (NBR). They were introduced in 1888 with inside cylinders and Stephenson valve gear. A total of 168 locomotives was built, of which 123 came into British Railways ownership at nationalisation in 1948. This was the last class of steam engine in service in Scotland.

Holmes' predecessor, Dugald Drummond, had designed 32 earlier locomotives (classified by the LNER as Class J32) that were built between 1876 and 1877. The NBR gave these engines the same designation (C class) as the Matthew Holmes engines above. The two types were very similar, and shared the same (then unusual) 18 inch cylinder size. Between 1898 and 1903, Holmes had all 32 of the Drummond locomotives rebuilt to match his own C class design. Thus the locomotives were considered a single class by the NBR, although on passing to LNER ownership they received the separate designations of J36 and J32 respectively.

== Technical information ==
As built, they had a saturated (non-superheated) boiler at 140 lbf/in^{2} or 0.97 MPa (150 lbf/in^{2} or 1.03 MPa for the last 24) and Stephenson valve gears with slide valves. Between 1913 and 1923, the class was rebuilt with larger boilers set at 165 psi (1.14 MPa) and the Reid side-window cab.

== Ownership ==
=== NBR ===
==== Predecessors ====
After the introduction of the Drummond Class C (LNER Class J32) 18-inch cylinder 0-6-0s for use on the Waverley Line in 1876, the NBR reverted to the 17-inch design with the Drummond Class D (J34) in 1879 and the Holmes Class D (J33) in 1883.

==== Holmes C Class ====
With the opening of the second Tay Rail Bridge in July 1887 and the upcoming opening of the Forth Bridge in March 1890, the NBR needed more powerful goods locos. The result was the Holmes Class C (J36). Introduced in 1888, it was built in regular batches until 1900, eventually totalling 168 locos. 138 were built at the NBR's Cowlairs Works while the other 30 were split equally between Neilson and Company and Sharp, Stewart and Company.

==== World War I ====
During the First World War, 25 of the class were sent to France for service with the Railway Operating Division. On return to Scotland, they were given names of battles, generals and a cartoon soldier in recognition of their service. The names were hand-painted on the splasher above the middle driving wheel so often disappeared during repaints.

=== LNER ===
On 1 January 1923, all 168 locos came into LNER ownership, becoming Class J36. As with all ex-NBR locos, they had 9000 added to their number. The final eight unrebuilt locos were rebuilt in 1923. In 1937, Nos. 9714 and 9716 (later 5285 and 5287) were rebuilt with shorter chimneys and dome for use on the Gartverrie Branch. In 1946 the remaining locos were renumbered from 5210 to 5346. A number of locos had tender cabs fitted for use with snowplows.

=== BR ===
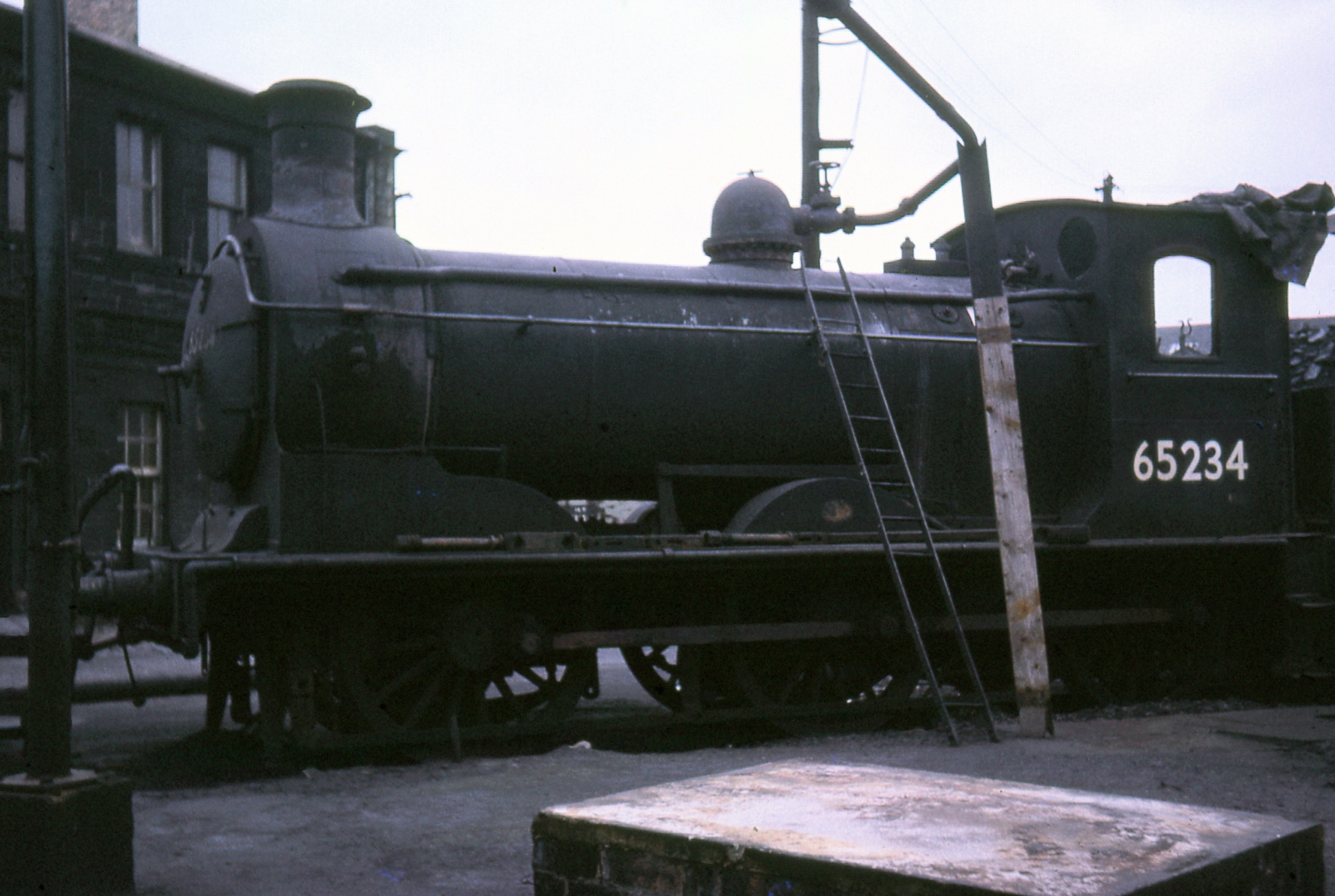
A sister locomotive to Maude connected as a stationary boiler, St Margaret's shed, Edinburgh, April 1967

At nationalisation in 1948, 123 locos passed into service of British Railways and had 60000 added to their number. 65288 of Dunfermline (62C) and 65345 of Thornton (62A) were the last to be withdrawn on 5 June 1967. They were the last steam locomotives in service in Scotland, outlasting the LNER and BR standard designs.

== Locomotive names ==
NBR Number	LNER 1946 Number	BR Number	Name
176	5217	65217	French
605			St Quentin
608			Foch
611	5268	65268	Allenby
612	5269		Ypres
615			Verdun
620			Rawlinson
621			Monro
627			Petain
628	5216	65216	Byng
631			Aisne
643			Arras
646	5222	65222	Somme
647	5223		Albert
648	5224	65224	Mons
650	5226	65226	Haig
657	5233	65233	Plumer
659	5235	65235	Gough
660	5236	65236	Horne
661			Ole Bill
662			Birdwood
666			Marne
673	5243	65243	Maude
676			Reims
682	5253	65253	Joffre

== Preservation ==
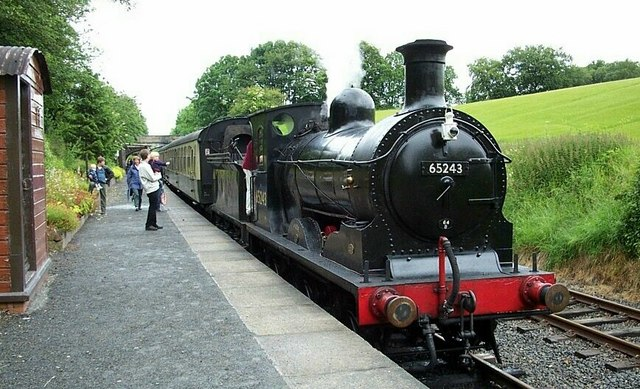
65243 on the Bo'ness and Kinneil Railway

One, 673 Maude (LNER number 9673; LNER 1946 number 5243; BR number 65243) has been preserved by the Scottish Railway Preservation Society at the Bo'ness and Kinneil Railway. It starred in the 2000 remake of The Railway Children on the Bluebell Railway in East Sussex. Last steamed in 2002, it is currently on static display awaiting funds for an overhaul.
