= NBR H class =

British steam locomotive class (1906–1937)

NBR Class I (LNER Class C10) NBR Class H (LNER Class C11)
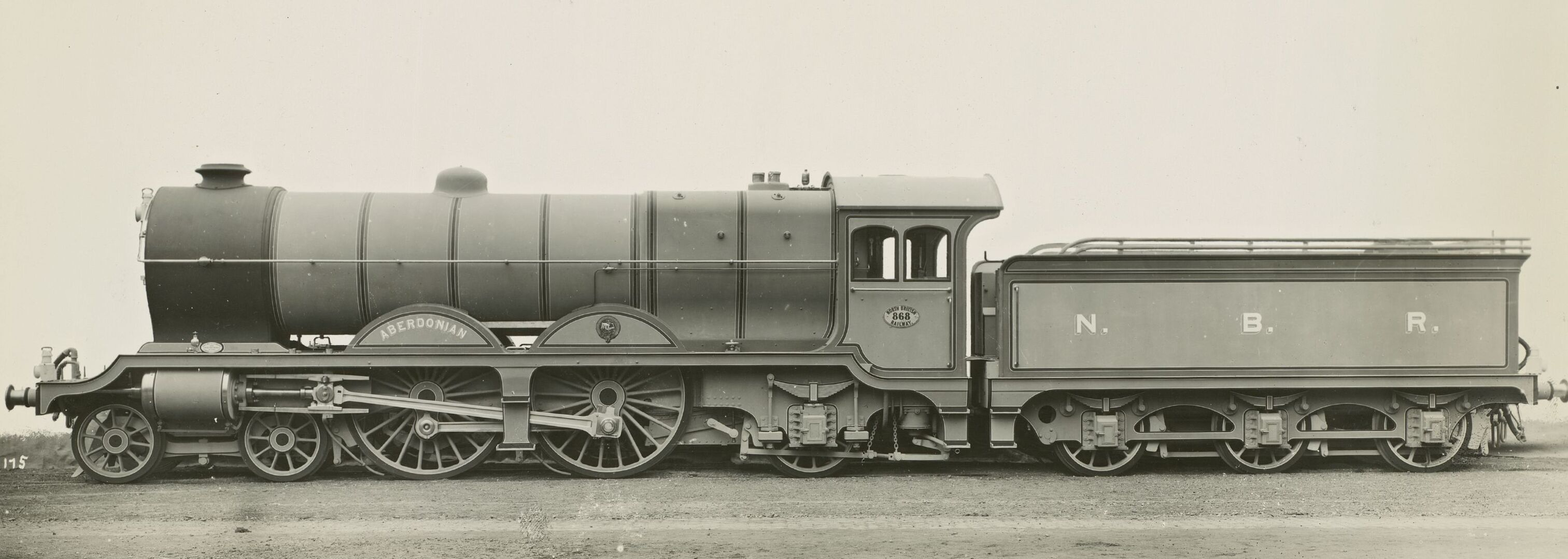
- NBR H class No. 868 Aberdonian
Type and origin
- Power type: Steam
- Designer: William Paton Reid
- Builder: North British Locomotive Co. (16); Robert Stephenson & Co. (6)
- Build date: 1906 (1st batch); 1911 (2nd batch); 1921 (3rd batch)
- Total produced: 22
Specifications
- Configuration
  - Whyte: 4-4-2
- Gauge: 4 ft 8 1/2 in (1,435 mm)
- Leading dia.: 3 ft 6 in (1.07 m)
- Coupled dia.: 6 ft 9 in (2.06 m)
- Trailing dia.: 4 ft 3 in (1.30 m)
- Length: 59 ft (18 m)
- Total weight: 119 long tons 8 cwt (267,500 lb or 121.3 t) (C11)
- Fuel type: Coal
- Boiler pressure: 190 psi (1,300 kPa) (C10); 180 psi (1,200 kPa) (C11)
- Cylinders: Two outside
- Cylinder size: 20 in × 28 in (510 mm × 710 mm) (C10); 21 in × 28 in (530 mm × 710 mm) (C11)
Performance figures
- Tractive effort: C10: 22,331 lbf (99.33 kN); C11: 23,324 lbf (103.75 kN)
Career
- Operators: North British Railway; London and North Eastern Railway
- Nicknames: North British Atlantic
- Withdrawn: 1933-1937
- Disposition: All scrapped

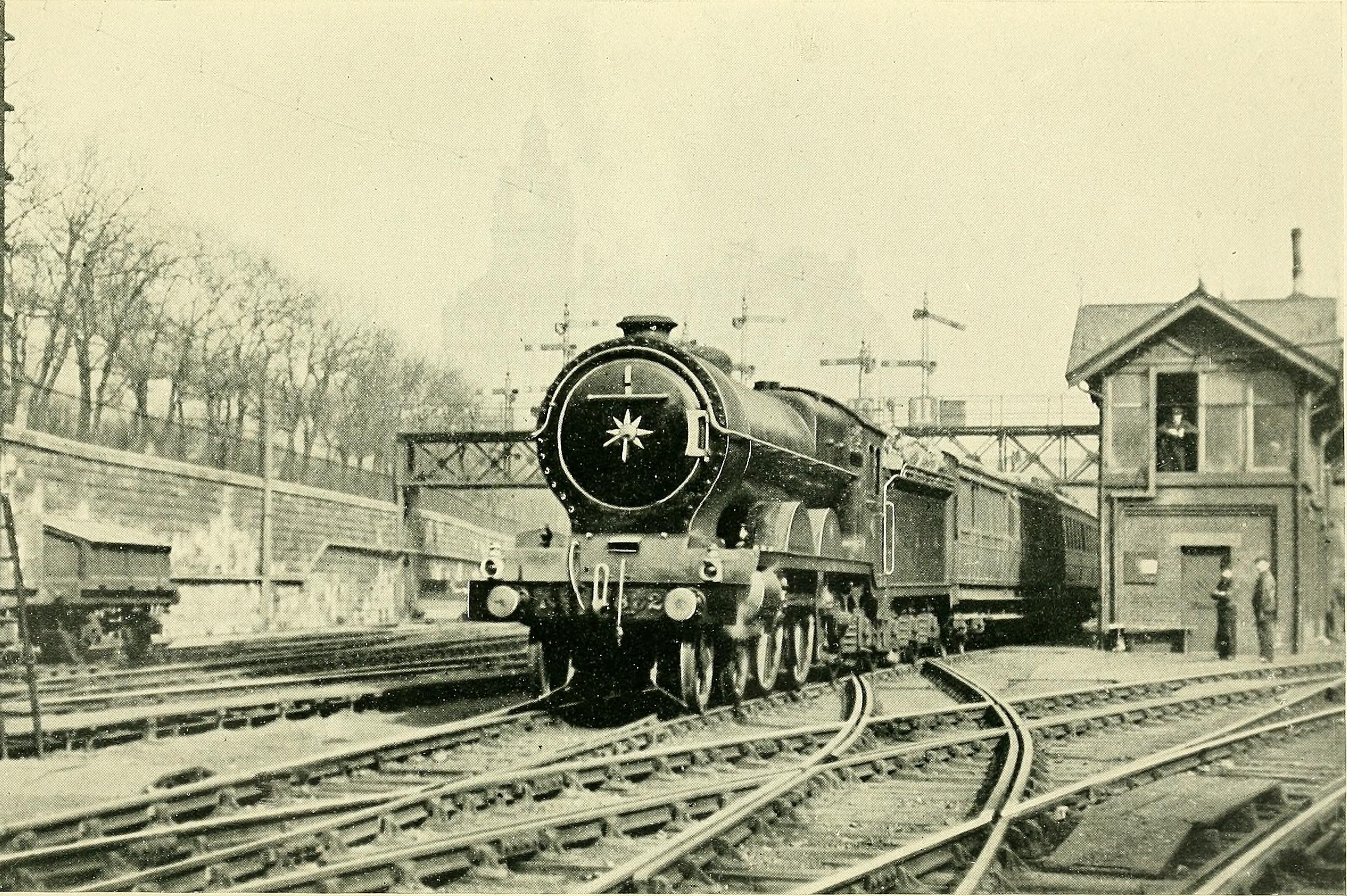
Locomotive 872 Auld Reekie departs Edinburgh with an express passenger service.

The North British Atlantic, later known as NBR Class H, and then as LNER Class C11 was a class of 4-4-2 steam locomotive of the North British Railway. The class was designed by William P. Reid, Locomotive Superintendent of the NBR, and entered service under his direction. They were the heaviest, longest, and most powerful (by tractive effort) locomotives ever employed on the North British Railway.

The locomotives passed to the London and North Eastern Railway in 1923. They had a long service life, but most were withdrawn during 1936 and 1937, with none surviving into the nationalized British Railways system.

The NBR Class I, later known as LNER Class C10, was a temporary designation of some engines in this class (see below).

== Design ==
In the early twentieth century the North British Railway possessed an ageing locomotive fleet which had not kept pace with modern demands. On the Board of Directors Dr John Inglis argued strongly for investment in the construction of new locomotives. Ultimately it was the persuasive arguments of Inglis, and the design skills of Locomotive Superintendent William Paton Reid, which led to the development of the NBR's new flagship locomotive, the North British Atlantic. The NBR Board met on 2 November 1905 and approved the construction of 14 heavy express passenger locomotives, with design work to commence immediately. The designs were drawn up by NBR Chief Draughtsman Walter Chalmers and were presented to the Board on 5 January 1906, tenders were invited on 13 January 1906, and the order placed before the end of the month.

Many railways were, in this era, constructing powerful express passenger locomotives of the 4-6-0 type, which benefit from 6 coupled driving wheels. The North British Railway's principal passenger engines had hitherto been of the 4-4-0 type, meaning that 4-coupled drive was more familiar. Additionally, the NBR had some very tight curves, for which the use of the "Atlantic" type engine with its 4-4-2 wheel arrangement was simply more practical and efficient.

== Build dates ==
The 14 locomotives were constructed and supplied during 1906. Having established themselves as the most powerful passenger locomotives on the North British network, but being insufficient in number to operate all of the crack express services, a further 6 engines were ordered and constructed during 1911. The construction of these 6 additional engines received widespread publicity internationally. Finally two more engines were ordered at the very end of 1920; these were constructed during 1921, and entered service that year.

== Reception ==
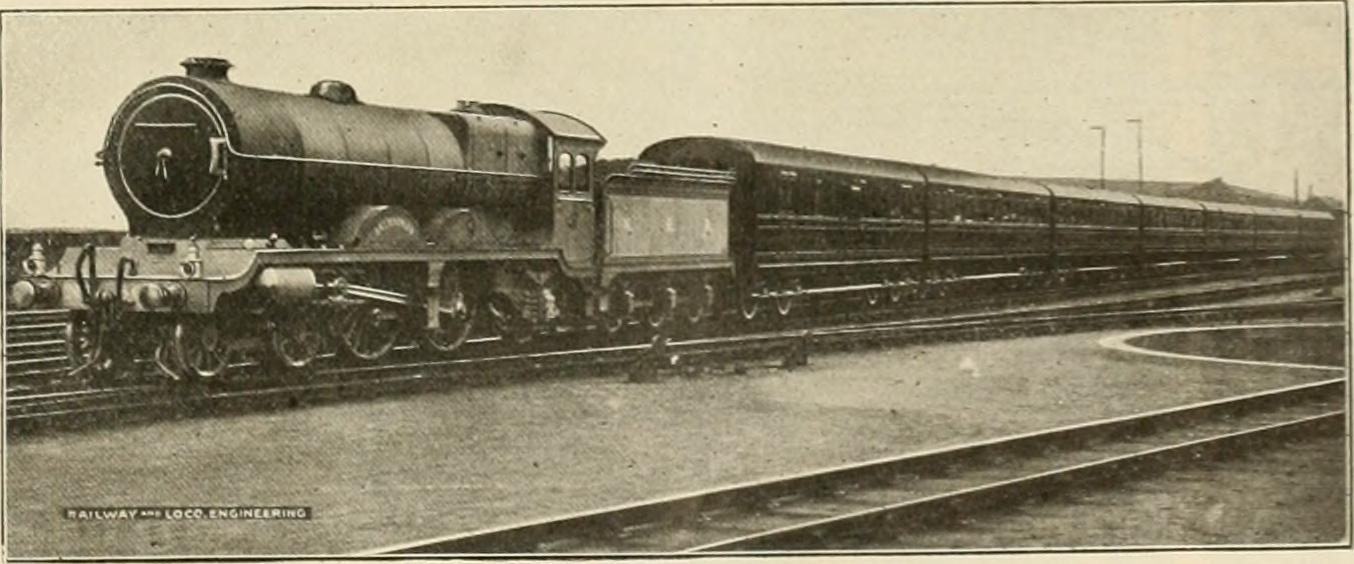
A North British Atlantic illustrated in Railway & Locomotive Engineering magazine of New York.

The North British Railway was overly ambitious in its advertising of the new locomotives, and despite rapid construction, the engines were not ready in time for the new timetables which they had been designed to serve. It was also discovered that owing to their size, the locomotives would not fit on the turntables owned by the North British Railway. This led to considerable operating difficulty until the turntables at key towns and cities could be enlarged. There was also some opposition to the use of the engines, particularly from James Bell, the NBR Civil Engineer, who felt that the engines were so heavy and powerful that they would cause damage to the permanent way for which he was responsible.

Alleged poor initial performance by the locomotives seems to have had more to do with poor management than poor design. Contemporary records show poor communication between the locomotive department (supplying engines) and the traffic department (requesting locomotives and matching them to services), as well as possibly unwarranted criticism from James Bell and others. Having become established, the locomotives gave good service for many years, and were the company's flagship engines, or "pride of the fleet".

== Rebuilding and designation ==
Starting in 1915, all engines in the class were fitted with superheaters. The final two engines, built in 1921, were fitted with superheaters from the outset.

The North British Railway did not historically give special designations to different locomotive classes, and in company records of the period 1906 and 1907, the atlantics are simply referenced as "Our new passenger locomotive". In later documentation, in 1908, 1909, and 1910, the engines are referenced as "locomotives of the atlantic type" or "our atlantic type engines". By the start of World War One the company was using a system of class designations, under which the North British Atlantics became known as Class H. Once the programme to fit superheaters had commenced, the saturated locomotives (those without a superheater) were re-designated as Class I, each one reverting to Class H again once its superheater had been fitted.

in 1923 the North British Railway became part of the LNER, during the superheating programme. The LNER designation for Class H engines was Class C11. However, as six engines were not yet superheated, and therefore inherited by the LNER as Class I engines, these were given LNER designation of Class C10. They reverted to the C11 designation, one by one, as their superheaters were installed between 1923 and 1925.

== Table of locomotives ==
Number (NBR)	Number (LNER)	Name	Builder	Works number	Entered service	Withdrawn	Notes
868	9868	Aberdonian	NB Locomotive Co	17369	1906	1933	First of class in service.
869	9869	Dundonian (until 1912); Bonnie Dundee (after 1912)	NB Locomotive Co	17370	1906	1935	
870	9870	Bon Accord	NB Locomotive Co	17371	1906	1937	
871	9871	Thane of Fife	NB Locomotive Co	17372	1906	1935	
872	9872	Auld Reekie	NB Locomotive Co	17373	1906	1935	
873	9873	St Mungo	NB Locomotive Co	17374	1906	1934	
874	9874	Dunedin	NB Locomotive Co	17375	1906	1933	First of class withdrawn.
875	9875	Midlothian	NB Locomotive Co	17376	1906	1937	Preserved 1938. Scrapped 1939.
876	9876	Waverley	NB Locomotive Co	17377	1906	1937	
877	9877	Liddesdale	NB Locomotive Co	17378	1906	1936	
878	9878	Hazeldean	NB Locomotive Co	17379	1906	1936	
879	9879	Abbotsford	NB Locomotive Co	17380	1906	1936	
880	9880	Tweeddale	NB Locomotive Co	17381	1906	1936	
881	9881	Borderer	NB Locomotive Co	17382	1906	1936	
901	9901	St Johnstoun	R Stephenson & Co	3428	1911	1937	
902	9902	Highland Chief	R Stephenson & Co	3429	1911	1936	
903	9903	Cock o' the North (until 1934); Aberdonian (from 1934)	R Stephenson & Co	3430	1911	1937	Hauled funeral train for Douglas Haig, 1st Earl Haig.
904	9904	Holyrood	R Stephenson & Co	3431	1911	1936	
905	9905	Buccleuch	R Stephenson & Co	3432	1911	1937	
906	9906	Teribus	R Stephenson & Co	3433	1911	1937	
509	9509	Duke of Rothesay	NB Locomotive Co	22689	1921	1937	
510	9510	The Lord Provost	NB Locomotive Co	22690	1921	1936	

== Accidents ==
The North British Atlantics enjoyed a good safety record throughout their career. Early concerns about their weight (as expressed by James Bell) and their centre of gravity (leading William Jackson, NBR General Manager, to order an expensive "swing test" of an engine in January 1907) proved unfounded. Nonetheless, engines of the class were involved in a number of incidents and accidents, of which the following are the most notable.

- 14 April 1914, 872 Auld Reekie, hauling an express passenger train, was involved in a collision with a shunting freight train at Burntisland railway station. Two people were killed and 12 were seriously injured. The locomotive suffered serious damage, and was left on its side, deeply embedded into the ground.
- 19 July 1914, 880 Tweeddale headed the 11.30pm Edinburgh to London St Pancras sleeper train when it was in collision with a Caledonian Railway night freight train near Carlisle. The Caledonian Railway driver, who was experiencing brake problems, was found to be at fault.
- 3 January 1917, 874 Dunedin in charge of the Edinburgh to Glasgow express train was in collision with a light engine at Queensferry Junction. Known as the Ratho rail crash, the incident left 12 people dead and 46 seriously injured. The cause was found to be inadequate signalling procedures. The locomotive's smokebox, boiler, frame, and cylinders were all badly damaged.
- 15 June 1918, 871 Thane of Fife was in collision with a Caledonian Railway locomotive (running light engine) near Aberdeen joint station. The cause was a signalling error. One passenger, a boy, was killed; eight others were injured.
- 28 June 1924, 868 Aberdonian was involved in an accident at Buddon, in charge of the London King's Cross to Aberdeen sleeper train. The only significant incident during operation of the locomotives by the LNER.

== Preservation ==
Locomotives of this class were withdrawn from service in the 1930s. Two in 1933, one in 1934, three in 1935, then eight in 1936, and eight in 1937. The final locomotive withdrawn was Midlothian in December 1937. In a remarkable piece of railway history, an order was issued that Midlothian should be preserved for the nation, as an example of such an important class of locomotive, but the order was not received until after the engine had been scrapped at Cowlairs. So that the national collection was not denied a Class H engine, Midlothian (whose component parts were mostly still in existence, and frame still fully intact) was painstakingly rebuilt, and returned to service for transfer to the LNER Railway Museum at York (which later formed part of the basis of the National Railway Museum). Several parts of the locomotive had been disposed of, including one main connecting rod, and these were built new for the restored engine. Unfortunately, just a few months later the Second World War commenced, and there was a massive demand for metal to produce aircraft for the war effort. The newly rebuilt Midlothian was withdrawn from the museum stock, and scrapped for a second time, to provide aircraft-building materials.

== Models ==
The NBR H class is available as a commercially produced O gauge model by specialist NBR model company 62C Models. Several live-steam models of North British Atlantics have been built in 5 in (127 mm) gauge. The 7 1/4 in (184 mm) gauge locomotive Trojan (built 1928/29) is a historically important miniature railway locomotive whose design was based upon that of the North British Atlantic. Trojan was the oldest locomotive of the world's oldest miniature railway, the Saltwood Miniature Railway, until its closure in 1987. The locomotive is privately owned and was undergoing restoration in 2018.
