= Walter Chalmers =

British engineer

Walter Chalmers (27 February 1873 – 10 August 1957) was a British engineer. He followed his father into the North British Railway, starting as an apprentice at Cowlairs railway works. In 1904 he became Chief Draughtsman and, from 1920 to 1922, he was Chief Mechanical Engineer.

Chalmers was born in Leeds, to a Scottish father, Robert Chalmers from Paisley, Renfrewshire, and English mother, Sarah Jane Glendening, from Yorkshire. Robert had held the title Assistant Locomotive Superintendent and Chief Draughtsman. Walter Chalmers succeeded his father in the same role, but the title was abbreviated to Chief Draughtsman. In 1920, he succeeded William Paton Reid who had held the role of Locomotive Superintendent, but in line with other railway companies of the era, the title of the post was changed to Chief Mechanical Engineer. His own successor in the deputy position was J P Grassick, whose job title was also changed from Chief Draughtsman to Locomotive Running Superintendent.

== Locomotives ==
Because Grouping was imminent, Chalmers had little opportunity to develop new steam locomotive types but he did supervise the rebuilding of the last eighteen locomotives of NBR Class M 4-4-0 (later LNER Class D31). He also designed a three-cylinder 2-8-0 mineral engine but this never got beyond the drawing board.

Dimensions of LNER Class D31 (as rebuilt)

- Weights:
  - Locomotive, 46 tons 8 cwt
  - Tender, 33 tons 9 cwt
- Boiler pressure, 175 psi
- Superheater, no
- Cylinders, 18 1/4" x 26"
- Driving wheel diameter, 6' 6"
- Tractive effort, 16,515 lbf

Seven D31s passed into British Railways ownership in 1948 but three of these were quickly withdrawn leaving BR numbers 62059, 62060, 62065 and 62072. The last D31 was withdrawn in 1952 and none was preserved.

== Post-grouping ==
Chalmers continued to work for the London and North Eastern Railway after the 1923 Grouping but retired in June 1924.

Preceded by William P. Reid	Chief Mechanical Engineer of the North British Railway; 1920-1922	Succeeded by Nigel Gresley (LNER)
