= NBR K Class =

Class of British locomotives

NBR K Class LNER Class D26 / D32 / D33 / D34
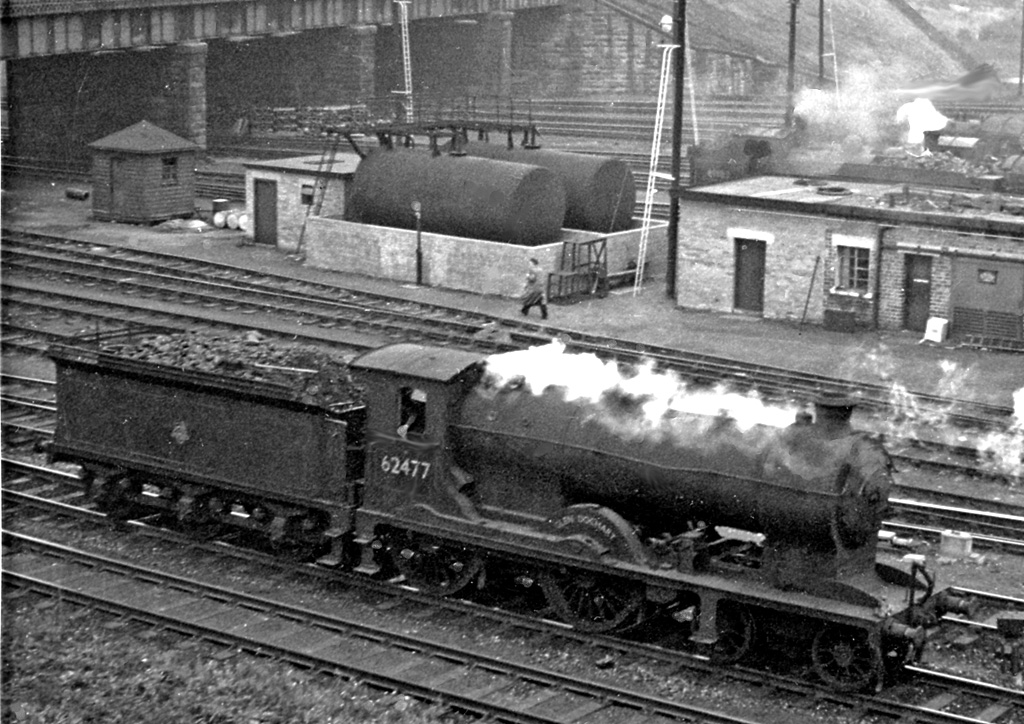
- 62477 Glen Dochart on Eastfield Locomotive Depot, Glasgow, September 1957
Type and origin
- Power type: Steam
- Designer: D26, Matthew Holmes; D32/D33/D34, William P. Reid
- Builder: NBR Cowlairs works
- Build date: 1903–1920
- Total produced: 68
Specifications
- Configuration
  - Whyte: 4-4-0
- Gauge: 4 ft 8 1/2 in (1,435 mm) standard gauge
- Leading dia.: 3 ft 6 in (1.067 m)
- Driver dia.: D26, 6 ft 6 in (1.981 m); D32/D33/D34, 6 ft 0 in (1.829 m)
- Length: D34, 17.068 m (56.00 ft) D26,17.145 m (56.25 ft)
- Loco weight: D26, 52 long tons (53 t; 58 short tons); D32/1, 53 long tons (54 t; 59 short tons); D32/2, 53.7 long tons (54.6 t); D33, 54.05 long tons (54.92 t; 60.54 short tons); D34, 57.2 long tons (58.1 t; 64.1 short tons)
- Tender weight: D26/D32, 40 long tons (41 t; 45 short tons); D33, 44.6 long tons (45.3 t); D34, 46.65 long tons (47.40 t)
- Fuel type: Coal
- Boiler pressure: D26/D32/1/D33, 190 psi (1.3 MPa); D32/2/D34, 180 psi (1.2 MPa)
- Cylinders: Two inside
- Cylinder size: D26/D32/D33, 19 in × 26 in (483 mm × 660 mm); D34, 20 in × 26 in (508 mm × 660 mm)
Performance figures
- Tractive effort: D26, 19,434 lbf (86.45 kN); D32/1/D33, 21,053 lbf (93.65 kN); D32/2, 19,945 lbf (88.72 kN); D34, 22,100 lbf (98 kN)
Career
- Operators: NBR » LNER » BR
- Power class: BR: 3P (except D26)
- Nicknames: Glen class (D34 only), Intermediates (D32 and D33 only)
- Withdrawn: 1922-1926, 1946-1962
- Disposition: One preserved, remainder scrapped

The NBR K Class is a class of 4-4-0 steam locomotive of the North British Railway. The first batch (later LNER Class D26) was designed by Matthew Holmes in 1902 and had 6-foot-6-inch (1.981 m) driving wheels for express passenger work. Three more batches (later LNER Classes D32, D33, and D34) were designed by William P. Reid with 6-foot-0-inch (1.829 m) driving wheels for mixed traffic work. This included perishable goods, such as fish from Mallaig and Aberdeen. They had inside cylinders and Stephenson valve gear. The D34 locomotives, commonly known as the Glen Class, were built with superheaters. The LNER later fitted superheaters to all D26, D32, and D33 engines as well. All engines of the K class are sometimes known as the Glen Class, although the designation is strictly reserved to the fourth (D34) batch.

== LNER classes ==
The LNER divided the NBR K class into four classes, as below. It was common practice for the North British Railway to assign similar engines to the same class group, whereas the LNER system allowed only identical engines to bear the same class designation.

=== LNER Class D26 ===
Twelve engines ordered in March 1902 and built at Cowlairs railway works in 1903. Three were withdrawn in 1922, leaving nine to enter LNER ownership in 1923. These nine had all been withdrawn by July 1926.

=== LNER Class D32 ===
Twelve engines ordered in 1905 and built at Cowlairs in 1906–07. The LNER began to fit superheated boilers in 1923 and classified the superheated locomotives D32/2. The non-superheated locomotives were classified D32/1.

=== LNER Class D33 ===
Twelve engines built at Cowlairs in 1909–10. The LNER fitted superheaters to all the D33s between 1925 and 1936.

=== LNER Class D34 ===
Ten engines built at Cowlairs in 1913. Twenty-two engines built between 1917 and 1920. All the D34s were built with superheaters. They are known as the Glen Class, as all engines in the group were named after Scottish glens.

== Post-NBR ==
The locomotives passed to the London and North Eastern Railway (LNER) in 1923 and, some of them, to British Railways (BR) in 1948. BR numbers were:

- D32, five locomotives, 62445-62454 (with gaps)
- D33, nine locomotives, 62455-62466 (with gaps)
- D34, thirty locomotives, 62467-62498 (with gaps)

== Accidents and incidents ==
- On 28 December 1906, locomotive No. 324 was hauling an express passenger train that was in a rear-end collision with a passenger train at Elliot Junction, Forfarshire. Twenty-two people were killed and eight were injured.

== Names ==
The D34s were named after Scottish Glens:

Roster of D34s
Build date (month/year)	NBR no.	Name	LNER 1st no.	LNER 2nd no.	BR no.	Withdrawal date (month/year)	Notes
9/1913	149	Glenfinnan	9149	2467	62467	8/1960	Only D34 with its name written as a singular word.
9/1913	221	Glen Orchy	9221	2468	62468	9/1958	
9/1913	256	Glen Douglas	9256	2469	62469	12/1962	Preserved.
9/1913	258	Glen Roy	9258	2470	62470	3/1959	
10/1913	266	Glen Falloch	9266	2471	62471	6/1960	
12/1913	307	Glen Nevis	9307	2472	62472	10/1959	
12/1913	405	Glen Spean	9405	2473	(62473)	5/1949	Withdrawn before BR number could be applied.
12/1913	406	Glen Croe	9406	2474	62474	6/1961	
12/1913	407	Glen Beasdale	9407	2475	62475	6/1959	
12/1913	408	Glen Sloy	9408	2476	(62476)	2/1950	Withdrawn before BR number could be applied.
5/1917	100	Glen Dochart	9100	2477	62477	10/1959	
5/1917	291	Glen Quoich	9291	2478	62478	12/1959	
5/1917	298	Glen Sheil	9298	2479	62479	6/1961	
6/1917	153	Glen Fruin	9153	2480	62480	10/1959	
7/1917	241	Glen Ogle	9241	2481	(62481)	9/1949	Withdrawn before BR number could be applied.
3/1919	242	Glen Mamie	9242	2482	62482	3/1960	
3/1919	270	Glen Garry	9270	2483	62483	4/1959	
4/1919	278	Glen Lyon	9278	2484	62484	11/1961	
4/1919	281	Glen Murran	9281	2485	62485	3/1960	
4/1919	287	Glen Gyle	9287			2/1946	Withdrawn before its 1946 number could be applied. Carried the name Glen Lyon for about a month at the end of 1941.
4/1920	504	Glen Aladale	9504	2488	62488	10/1960	
5/1920	503	Glen Arklet	9503	2487	62487	9/1959	
5/1920	505	Glen Cona	9505	2491		12/1947	Withdrawn before nationalisation.
5/1920	490	Glen Dessary	9490	2489	62489	12/1959	
5/1920	502	Glen Fintaig	9502	2490	62490	2/1959	
6/1920	34	Glen Garvin	9034	2492	62492	6/1959	
6/1920	35	Glen Gloy	9035	2493	62493	6/1960	
7/1920	492	Glen Gau (until 7/1925) Glen Gour (from 7/1925)	9492	2494	62494	4/1959	Originally named Glen Gau, but since no glen of that name exists, it was renamed in July 1925, becoming Glen Gour.
7/1920	493	Glen Luss	9493	2495	62495	4/1961	
8/1920	494	Glen Loy	9494	2496	62496	11/1961	
8/1920	495	Glen Mallie	9495	2497	62497	2/1960	
9/1920	496	Glen Moidart	9496	2498	62498	3/1960	

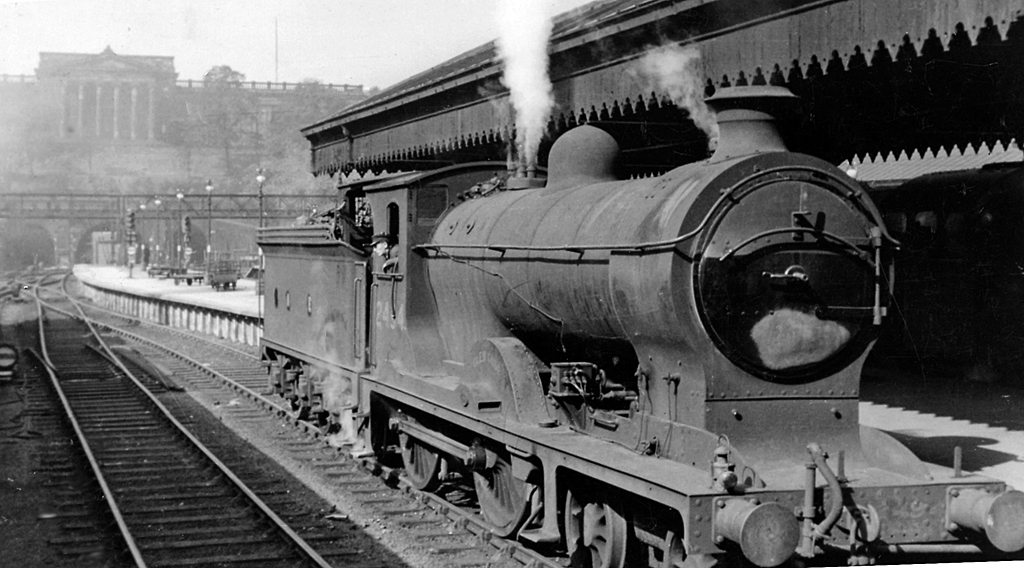
Number 2494 Glen Gour at Edinburgh Waverley railway station in August 1948.

== Railway Roundabout ==
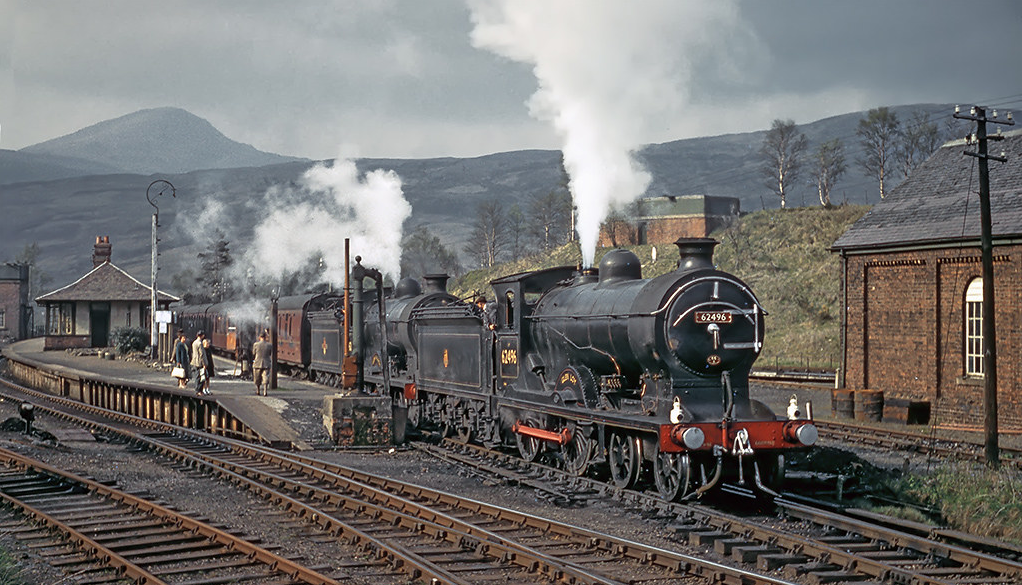
Double heading D34s, nos. 62496 Glen Loy (the pilot engine) and 62471 Glen Falloch (the train engine) on a trip from Glasgow Queen Street to Fort William.

In May 1959, the two cameramen of Railway Roundabout, Patrick Whitehouse and John Adams, visited the West Highland Line in Mallaig, and arranged a filming special taking place on a double-headed train from Glasgow Queen Street to Fort William. The two engines used, nos. 62496 Glen Loy and 62471 Glen Falloch (the pilot and train engine respectively), were cleaned up and were in immaculate condition for the cameras. Photographs of the trip in color show Glen Loy and Glen Falloch with red smokebox numberplates and red siderods. The filming special had taken place over several days and used three runs of the trip in the process. The first trip saw a Southern Railway luggage van at the front of the consist and many lineside shots were possible. Filming on the third train showed a view from the back of the train approaching Rannoch. When the film was ready for broadcasting, it was entitled Two Glens to Fort William and was broadcast on 8 December 1959.

This film, along with 100 others, was purchased from Patrick Whitehouse and John Adams by the National Railway Museum and can still be seen today in the National Railway Museum at York.

== Preservation ==
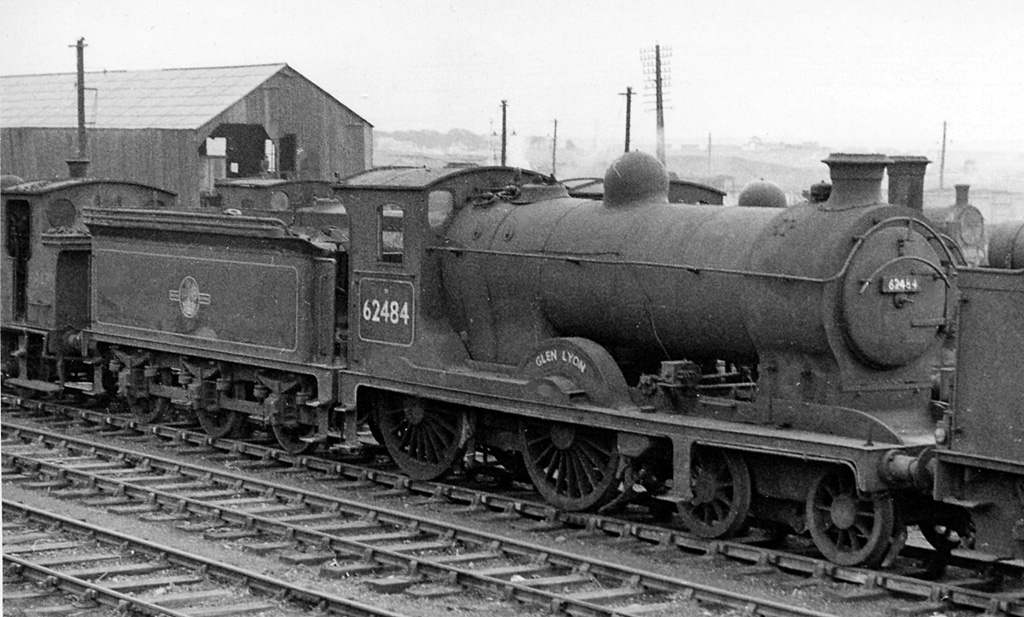
In September 1962, a year after being withdrawn, number 62484 Glen Lyon waits to be scrapped.

Withdrawals began in 1946 and all the D34s had been withdrawn by 1961. One, 256 Glen Douglas (BR number 62469) has been preserved by the Scottish Railway Preservation Society. It is now on display at the Riverside Museum in Glasgow.

== Models ==
PDK Models, Crownline, and Gem Loco Kits all produce model kits of the D34 in 4mm (OO gauge) scale.

Jack Morgan of Rails of Sheffield announced on 15 July 2025 the release of OO gauge models of the D34s in partnership with Sonic Models. Equipped with 21-pin DCC ready socket, fitted speakers, among other features, the models are planned to be in stock come October of 2026, and all products can be seen in the table below.

Sonic Models' D34 roster
Product Ref.	Number	Name	Livery
S4103-01	221	Glen Orchy	NBR olive brown; full lining with coat of arms
S4103-02	291	Glen Quoich	NBR olive brown; full lining
S4103-03	9493	Glen Luss	LNER lined grass green
S4103-04	9307	Glen Nevis	LNER lined grass green
S4103-05	9153	Glen Fruin	LNER black; red lining
S4103-06	62488	Glen Aladale	BR lined black; pre-1957 crest
S4103-07	62467	Glenfinnan	BR lined black; post-1957 crest
S4103-08	256	Glen Douglas	NBR dark olive green
S4103-09*	62496	Glen Loy	BR lined black; pre-1957 crest
S4103-09*	62471	Glen Falloch	BR lined black; post-1957 crest

*Released together as part of the BBC Film Special May 1959 twin pack.
