= Neilson and Company =

British locomotive manufacturer, 1836–1903

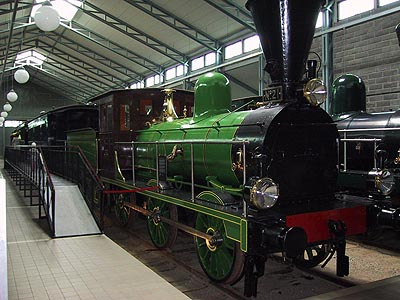
Restored Neilson 0-6-0 Finnish Steam Locomotive Class C1, used in Finland from 1869 well into the 1920s, preserved at the Finnish Railway Museum

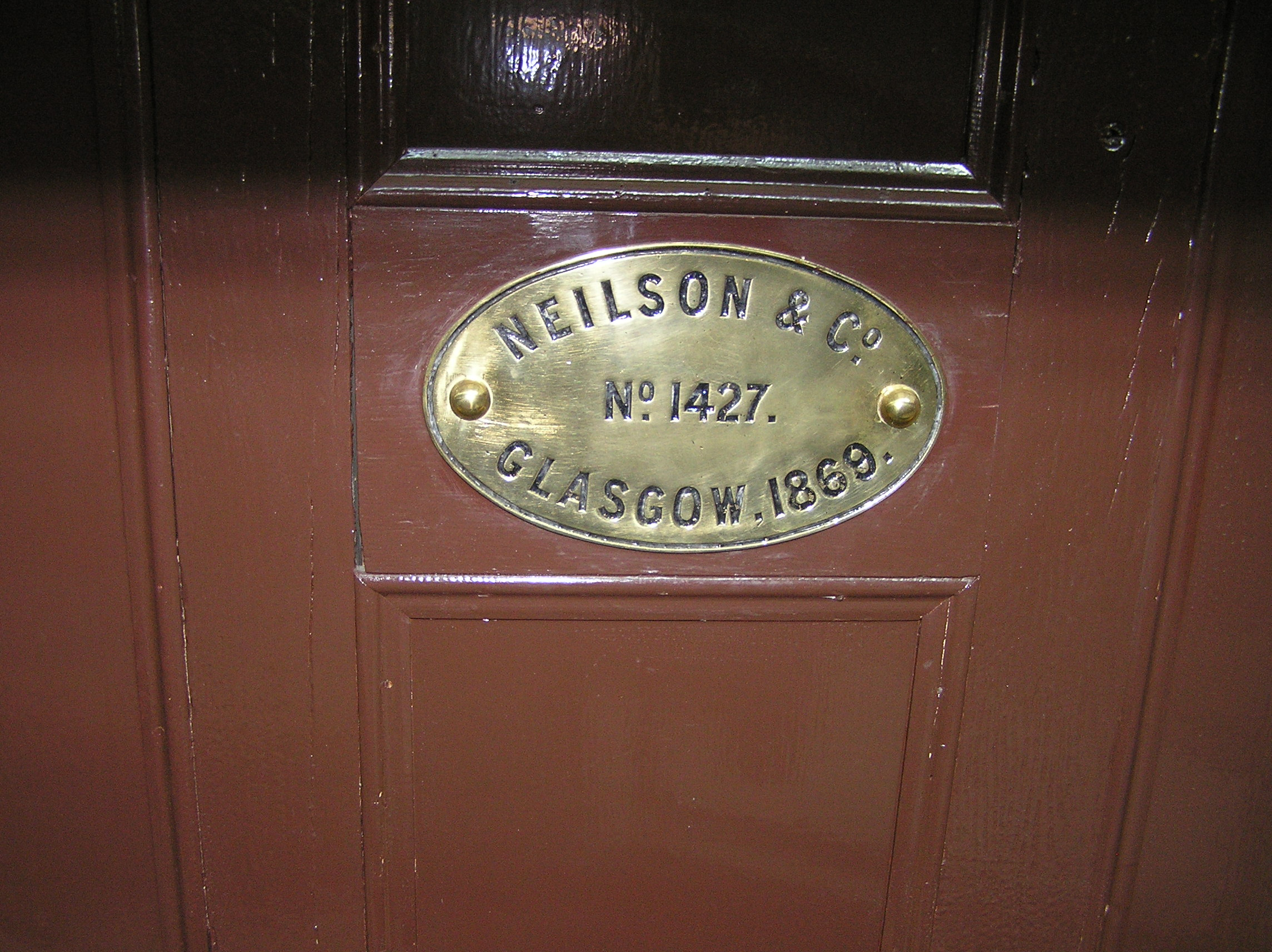
Neilson & Co works plate, on the same locomotive

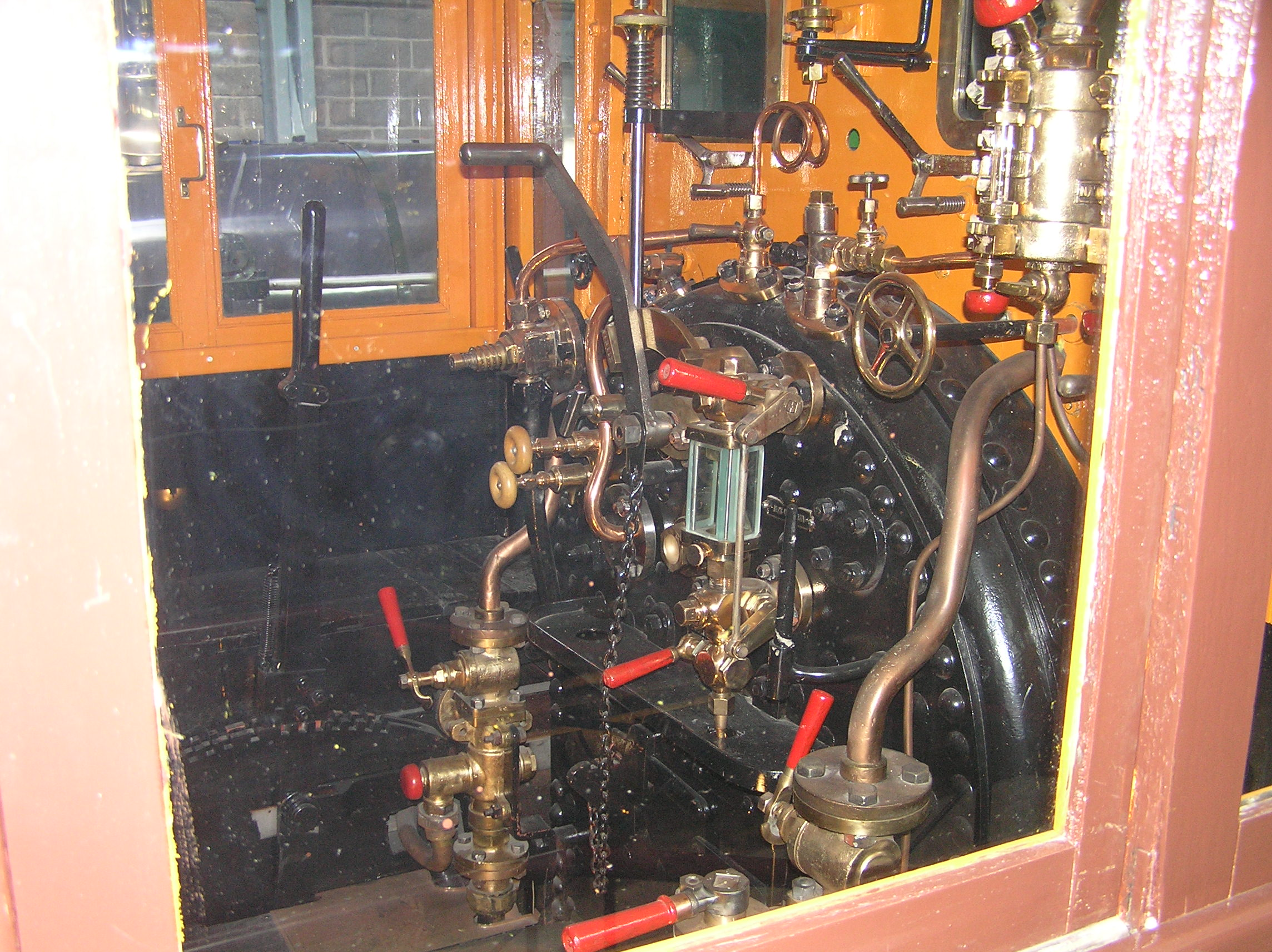
The cab interior, on the same locomotive

Neilson and Company was a locomotive manufacturer in Glasgow, Scotland.

The company was started in 1836 at McAlpine Street by Walter Neilson and James Mitchell to manufacture marine and stationary engines. In 1837 the firm moved to Hyde Park Street and was known as Kerr, Mitchell and Neilson and, in 1840, Kerr, Neilson and Company, becoming Neilson and Mitchell in 1843.

Locomotive building began in 1843 for the local railways. In 1855 production of marine and stationary engines discontinued and the company changed its name again to Neilson and Company. Among those who later became notable in the field were Henry Dübs and Patrick Stirling.

By 1861, business had increased to such an extent, that a new works was built at Springburn, also named "Hyde Park Works." In 1864, Henry Dübs set up in business on his own at Queens Park Works, as Dübs and Company, taking a number of key staff with him. James Reid, who had previously worked for Neilson, however, returned and became a partner.

== Stationary Engines ==
When the Edinburgh and Glasgow Railway was opened in 1842, it used a pair of Neilson & Mitchell beam engines to work the rope incline from Glasgow to Cowlairs station. The engines were covered by an article illustrated with drawings in The Practical Mechanic and Engineer's Magazine in Jan 1844. They were beam engines mounted on an entablature supported on fluted columns. The engines had 28 inch cylinders, and 6 foot stroke. They were supplied with steam at 50psi by 8 boilers, each 30 foot long and 5 foot diameter.

== Locomotives ==
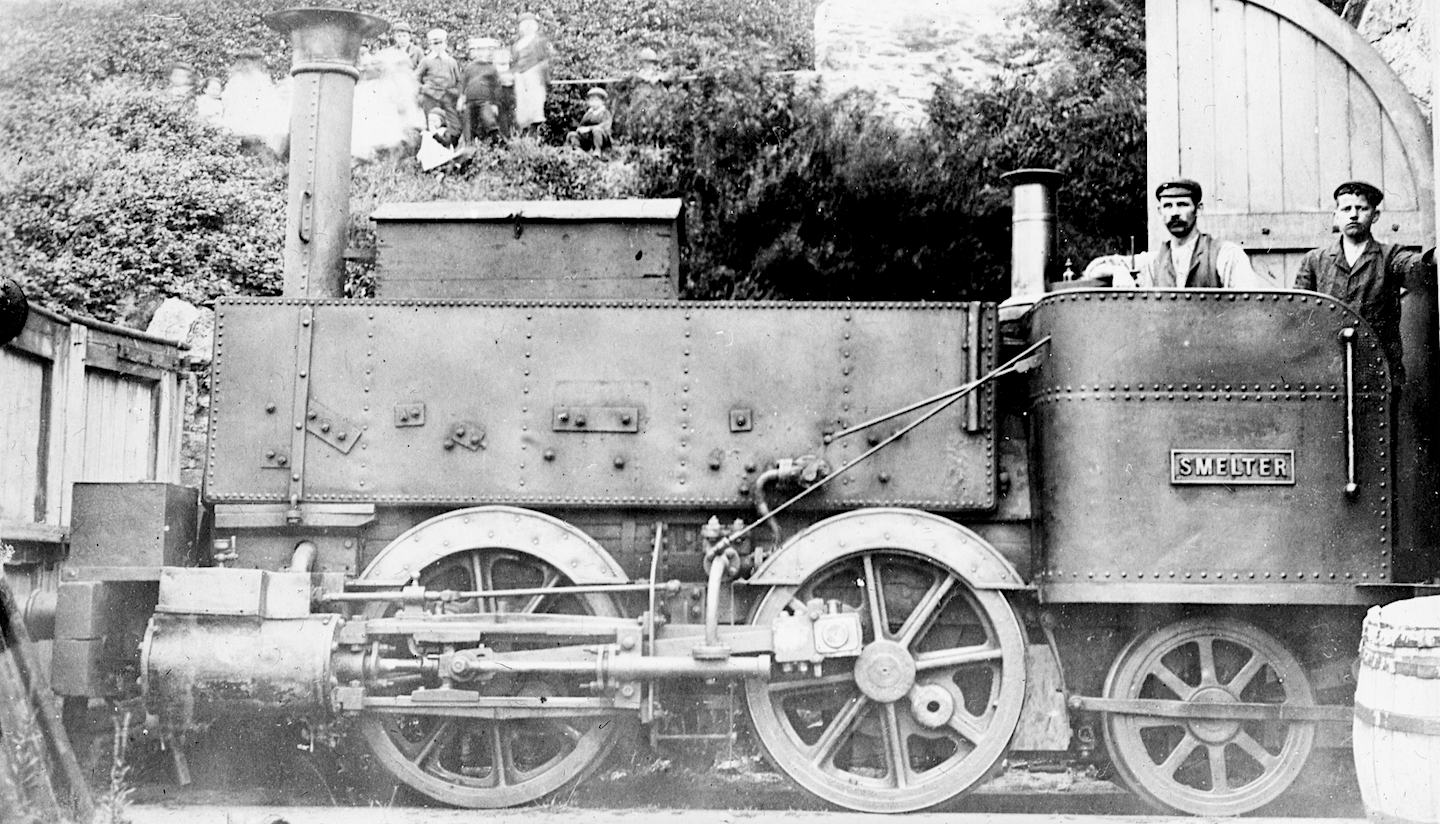
Box tank locomotive "Smelter" of 1854

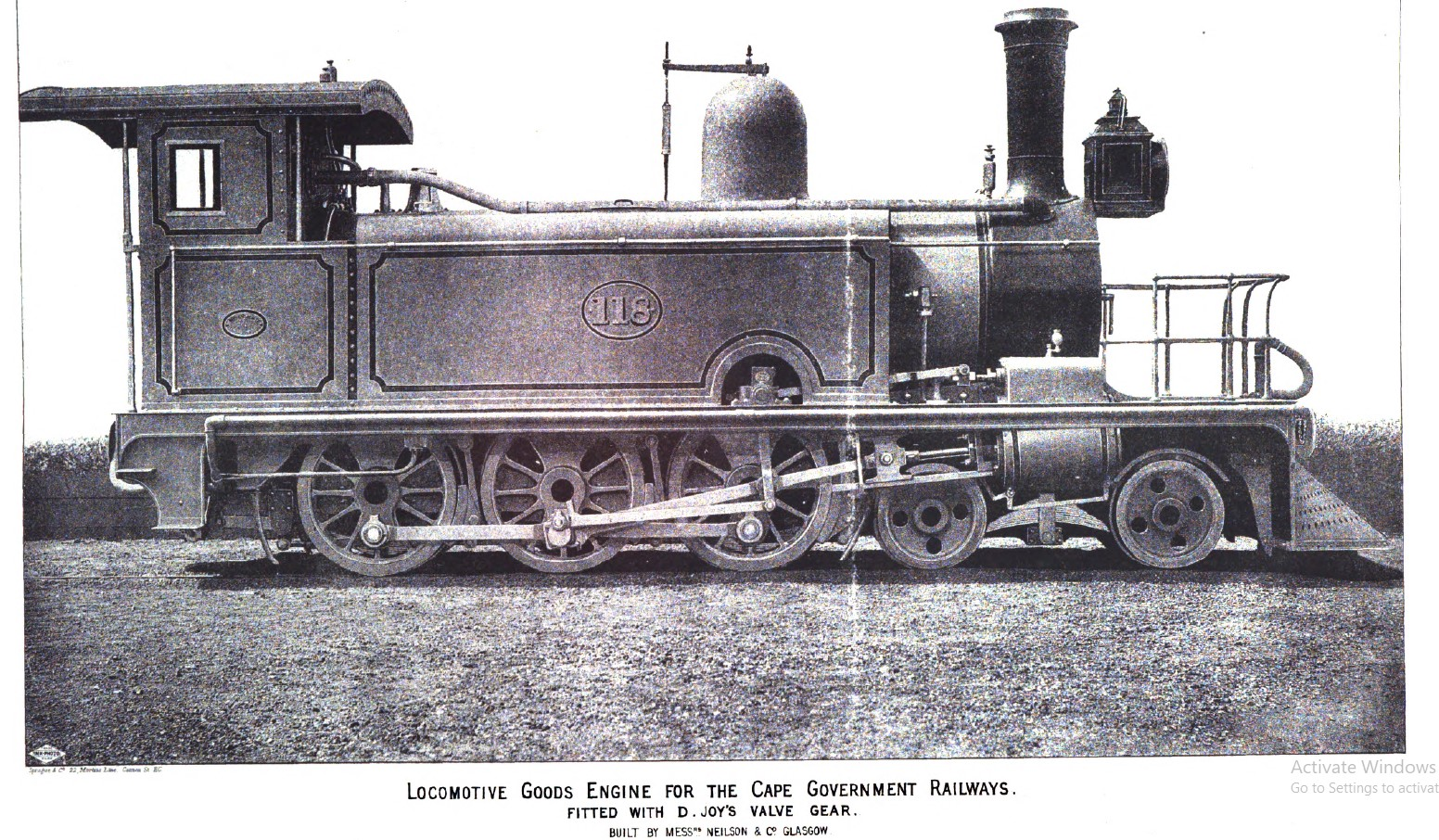
4-6-0 locomotive built in 1883

By 1855, the company was building four-coupled tank engines, along with 2-4-0 and 0-4-2 tender locos. Some of these were for Cowlairs and St. Rollox, but many more went to India.

Through the 1870s considerable numbers of 0-4-4 tank engines were built for the London, Chatham and Dover Railway, the Midland and the Great Eastern. Many other types were built for railways at home and abroad, including fifty 0-4-2s for India. The company's first eight-coupled locos were built in 1872, also for India.

In 1879 the first 2-6-0s to run on British rails were built for William Adams of the Great Eastern. One of these was named "Mogul" and this became the name applied to all locomotives of this wheel arrangement. (However, the name had already been employed in the USA about ten years earlier.)

More overseas orders followed, with engines for South Africa and South America. The Engineer journal in 1883 carried a photograph of a Neilson 4-6-0 with Joy valve gear produced for the Cape Government Railways.

== Turn of the 20th century ==
In 1884, Neilson left to form a new company, the Clyde Locomotive Company; although Reid became the sole owner of Neilson & Co., it was not until 1898 that the company changed its name to Neilson, Reid and Company.

However, by this time, intense competition from United States meant that small companies were unable to survive. There was a need for amalgamation, and in 1903 Neilson Reid combined with Dübs and Company and Sharp, Stewart and Company to form the North British Locomotive Company, the largest locomotive company in the world outside the United States.

== Preserved Neilson engines ==
=== Argentina ===
General Urquiza Railway

• 3804 1888 FCNEA #5, FCNGU #66. 2-6-0+4 “San Martín” Preserved at Cerrito, province of Entre Ríos.

• 3854 1888 FCNEA #11, FCNGU #68. 2-6-0+4 “Yatay” Preserved on restoration at Ferroclub Argentino, province of Buenos Aires.

• 3864 1890 FCNEA #21, FCNGU #36. 0-6-0+4 “Itatí” Preserved at Liniers Club APDFA, Ciudad Autónoma de Buenos Aires.

• 3870 1890 FCNEA #27, FCNGU #41. 0-6-0+4 “Monte Caseros” Preserved on work at Ferroclub Argentino, province of Buenos Aires.

• 3872 1890 FCNEA #29, FCNGU #43. 0-6-0+4 “Juarez Celman” Preserved at Basavilbaso, province of Entre Ríos.

• 3873 1890 FCNEA #30, FCNGU #44. 0-6-0+4 “Sarmiento” Preserved at Oro Verde, province of Entre Ríos.

=== Australia ===
- The Workshops, Ipswich 0-4-2 No 1170 of 1865 Queensland A10 Neilson class locomotive
- The Workshops, Ipswich 0-4-2 No 1214 of 1866 Queensland A10 Neilson class locomotive
- Rail Heritage WA 0-6-0T No 3631 of 1888 WAGR H class

=== Finland ===
- Finnish Railway Museum at Hyvinkaa 0-6-0 Finnish Steam Locomotive Class C1 No 1427 of 1869

=== Ireland ===
- GNR(I) Q class 4-4-0 No. 131 (works number 5727) of 1901, preserved at Railway Preservation Society of Ireland

=== New Zealand ===
- Ferrymead Railway – "Peveril" No. 1692 of 1872 (F13)
- Silver Stream Railway – No. 1847 of 1874 (D143)
- Pleasant Point Railway – No. 2306 of 1878 (D16)
- Helensville Railway Station – No. 2563 of 1880 (D170)
- Lumsden Heritage Trust – No. 2564 of 1880 (D6)
- Kaitaia Township – No. 2565 of 1880 (D221)
- Bush Tramway Club – No. 3751 of 1888 (F216)

Neilson and Company supplied the first (F13 of 1872) and last (F216 of 1888) members of the 88-strong New Zealand Railways F class. Six builders supplied F class engines between the arrivals of F13 and F216.

=== United Kingdom ===
- GER Class 209 0-4-0ST No. 229 (works number 2119) of 1876, returned to steam in 2025 after ovehaul at The Flour Mill, Gloucestershire
- 0-4-0ST (works number 2203) of 1876, preserved at the Scottish Railway Preservation Society
- 0-4-0ST (works number 2937) of 1882, preserved at Chasewater Railway
- LSWR 415 class 4-4-2T No. 488 (works number 3209) of 1885, preserved at the Bluebell Railway
- Caledonian Railway Single 4-2-2 No. 123 (works number 3553) of 1886, preserved at the Riverside Museum
- NBR C Class 0-6-0 No. 673 'Maude' (works number 4392) of 1891, preserved at the Bo'ness and Kinneil Railway
- Beckton Gas Works 0-4-0WT No. 1 (works number 4444) of 1892, awaiting sale at Preston Services, Kent
- Beckton Gas Works 0-4-0ST No. 25 (works number 5087) of 1896, preserved at Bressingham Steam and Gardens
- Taff Vale Railway O2 class 0-6-2T No. 85 (works number 5408) of 1899, preserved on the Keighley and Worth Valley Railway

== Hyde Park Locomotive Works F.C. ==
Hyde Park Locomotive Works F.C.
- Founded: 1876
- Dissolved: 1877
- Ground: Vale Park
- Secretary: Thomas M'Ara
Home colours

In 1876, the company founded an association football club, called the Hyde Park Locomotive Works, playing in red and white 2 inch hoops. The club entered the 1876–77 Scottish Cup and lost in the first round, 2–1 at home to Crosshill, the club's goal scored by Watt.

The club entered for the following year's competition, and was drawn to play Blackfriars of Parkhead, but the club had already broken up, its last noted fixture being against Petershill in January 1877.

== Fiction ==
A character in The Railway Series by the Rev. W. Awdry is based on a Neilson prototype. Neil is a 'box tank' locomotive, who worked on the Sodor & Mainland Railway between 1853 and 1901.

== See also ==
- Finnish Railway Museum
- Category:Neilson locomotives
