= William P. Reid =

British civil engineer (1854–1932)

William Paton Reid
- Born: 8 September 1854; Glasgow, Scotland
- Died: 2 February 1932 (aged 77); Glasgow, Scotland
- Engineering career
- Discipline: Mechanical engineering
- Employer: North British Railway

William Paton Reid, CBE (8 September 1854 – 2 February 1932) was apprenticed to the Cowlairs railway works of the North British Railway in 1879 and was Locomotive Superintendent from 1903 to 1919. He was appointed a CBE in 1920. He was born, and died, in Glasgow, Scotland.

Prior to his appointment, he had been Assistant Locomotive Superintendent to his predecessor, Matthew Holmes.

== Locomotives ==
Reid modernised and rebuilt existing engines and introduced superheating to the North British Railway. New locomotives designed by him include:

- NBR Class B, later LNER Class J35, 0-6-0
- NBR Class S, later LNER Class J37 0-6-0
- NBR Class J, later LNER Class D29, 6' 6" 4-4-0, the "Scott class".
- NBR Class F, later LNER Class J88 0-6-0T
- NBR Class J, later LNER Class D30, 6' 6" 4-4-0, the "Super Scott Class" or "Superheated Scott class".
- NBR Class K, later LNER Class D32, 6' 0" 4-4-0
- NBR Class K, later LNER Class D33, 6' 0" 4-4-0
- NBR Class K, later LNER Class D34, 6' 0" 4-4-0, the "Glen Class".
- NBR Class H, later LNER Class C10,& C11 4-4-2, the "North British Atlantic class" (Reid's largest and most powerful design).
- NBR Class L, later LNER Class C16, 4-4-2T
- NBR Class M, later LNER Class C15, 4-4-2T

Some of the NBR classes had several variants. The NBR did not distinguish between the variants but the LNER did. The figures 6' 6" or 6' 0" indicate the driving wheel diameter.

== See also ==
- Locomotives of the North British Railway

Preceded by Matthew Holmes	Locomotive Superintendent (CME) of the North British Railway; 1903–1919	Succeeded by Walter Chalmers
