= NBR B class =

Class of British steam locomotives (1906–1913)

NBR B Class LNER Class J35
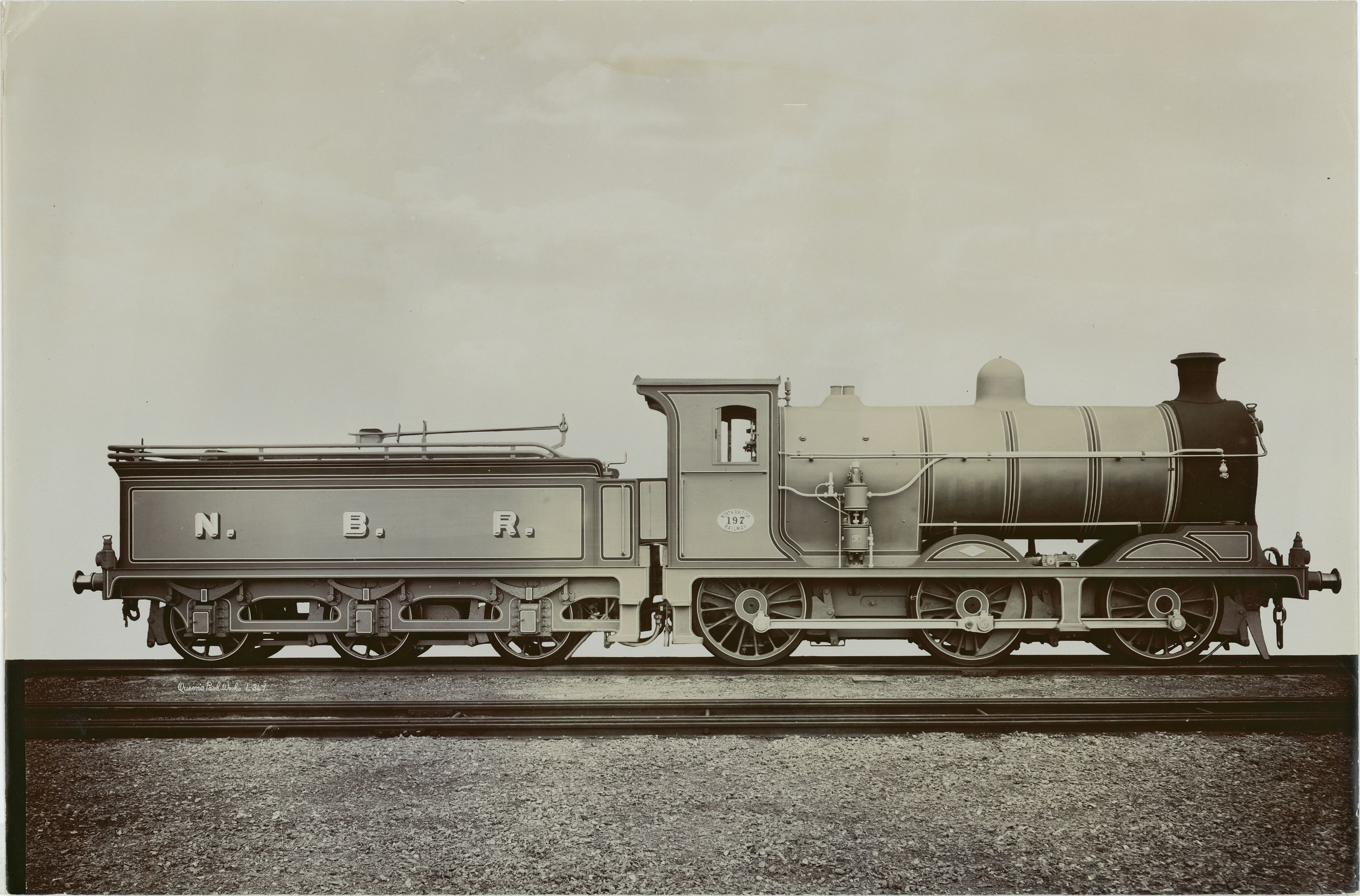
Type and origin
- Power type: Steam
- Designer: William Paton Reid
- Build date: 1906-1913
- Total produced: 76
Specifications
- Configuration
  - Whyte: 0-6-0
- Gauge: 4 ft 8 1/2 in (1,435 mm)
- Driver dia.: 5 ft 0 in (1.524 m)
- Loco weight: 51 long tons 0 cwt (114,200 lb or 51.8 t)
- Fuel type: Coal
- Boiler pressure: 180 lbf/in^{2} (1.24 MPa)
- Cylinders: Two, inside
- Cylinder size: 17 in × 24 in (432 mm × 610 mm)
- Valve gear: Stephenson
Performance figures
- Tractive effort: 22,080 lbf (98.22 kN)
Career
- Operators: NBR » LNER » BR
- Withdrawn: 1946-1962

The NBR B Class (LNER Class J35) is a class of 0-6-0 steam locomotive designed by William Paton Reid for freight work on the North British Railway. They were introduced in 1906 and had inside cylinders and Stephenson valve gear. The first eighteen locomotives had piston valves and the remainder had slide valves.

== Classification ==
Seventy-six locomotives were built and these passed to the London and North Eastern Railway (LNER) in 1923. The LNER classified them as follows:

- J35/1 Engines with piston valves
- J35/2 Engines with piston valves and short fireboxes
- J35/3 Engines with slide valves

The entire class was fitted with superheaters between 1923 and 1942 and re-classified from 1937 as follows:

- J35/4 Engines with superheaters and slide valves
- J35/5 Engines with superheaters and piston valves

== Numbering ==
Seventy locomotives of classes J35/4 and J35/5 came into British Railways (BR) ownership at nationalisation in 1948 and were numbered as follows:

- Class J35/5, 64460-64477
- Class J35/4, 64478-64535
