= Matthew Holmes (engineer) =

Scottish engineer (1844–1903)

- Born: 1844; Paisley
- Died: 3 July 1903 (aged 58–59); Lenzie
- Engineering career
- Discipline: Mechanical engineering

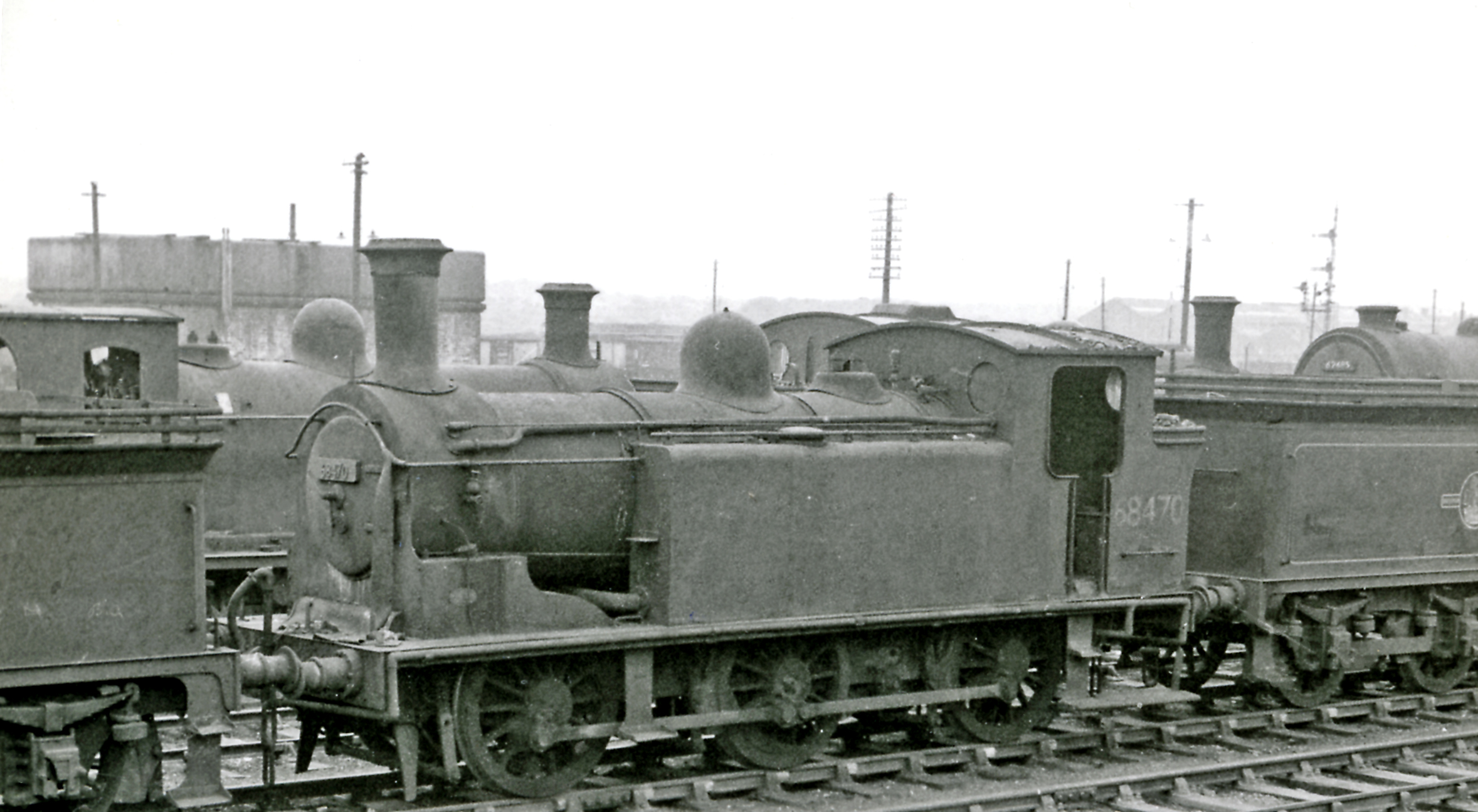
ex-NBR Holmes class D (LNER J83) 0-6-0T at Bathgate Locomotive Depot in 1962

Matthew Holmes (born in Paisley in 1844 and died in Lenzie on 3 July 1903) was Locomotive Superintendent of the North British Railway from 1882 to 1903.

The office had two deputies, the senior known as Assistant Locomotive Superintendent and Chief Draughtsman, the junior known as Assistant Locomotive Superintendent. Throughout his incumbency, Holmes's Assistant Locomotive Superintendent and Chief Draughtsman was Robert Chalmers. Various men held the position of Assistant Locomotive Superintendent, the last to do so being William Paton Reid. Holmes was succeeded in office by Reid. Later, Reid was to be succeeded by Robert Chalmers' son, Walter.

== Locomotive Designs ==
Locomotives designed by Holmes include:

- NBR Class C, later LNER Class J36 0-6-0,
- NBR D class 0-6-0T, later LNER Class J83 0-6-0T
- NBR Class M, later LNER Class D31 4-4-0
- NBR D class 0-6-0

== See also ==
- Locomotives of the North British Railway

Preceded by Dugald Drummond	Locomotive Superintendent (CME) of the North British Railway; 1882–1903	Succeeded by William P. Reid
