= Cowlairs railway works =

Coordinates: 55.882675°N 4.239416°W

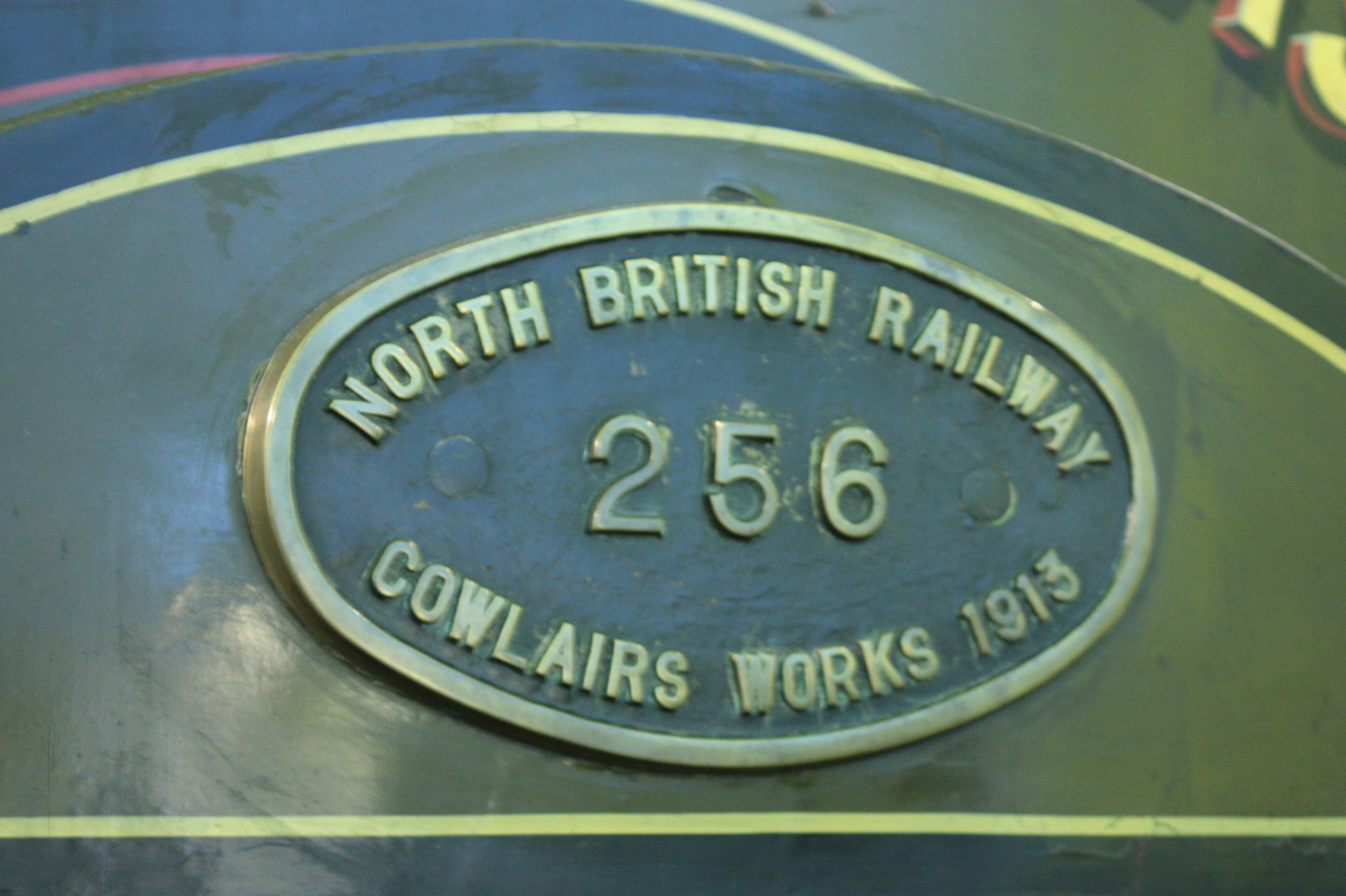
A Cowlairs production plate on a North British Railway Company engine

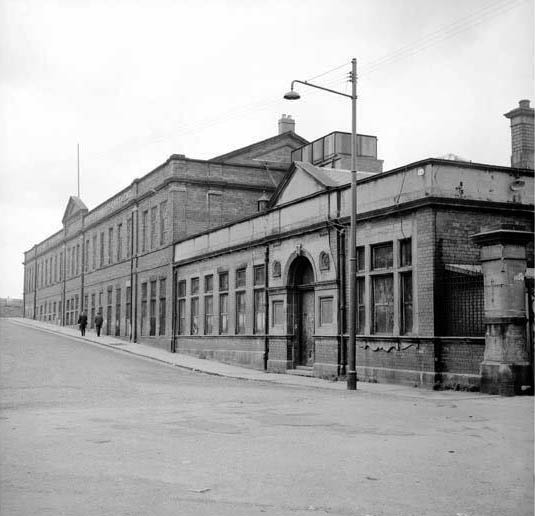
The former Cowlairs Locomotive Works at Inverurie Street, Springburn in April 1970.

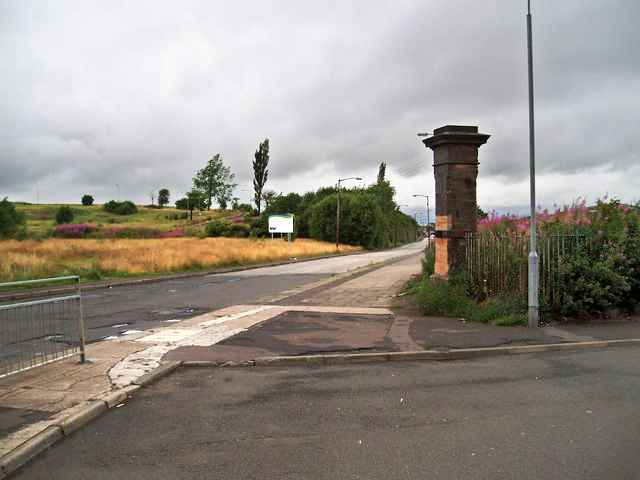
Site of the former Cowlairs Locomotive Works at Inverurie Street, Springburn in July 2009 (Carlisle St on the left was extended north through the former site).

Cowlairs Locomotive, Carriage and Wagon Works, at Cowlairs in Springburn, an area in the north-east of Glasgow, Scotland, was built in 1841 for the Edinburgh and Glasgow Railway and was taken over by the North British Railway (NBR) in 1865. It was named after the nearby mansion of Cowlairs, with both locomotive and carriage & wagon works. It was also the first works in Britain to build locomotives, carriages and wagons in the same place. It was located on the western side of the Glasgow-Edinburgh mainline at Carlisle Street.

In September 1904, the Eastfield Running Sheds were built on the other side of the Glasgow-Edinburgh mainline, just to the north of the Cowlairs complex, to maintain locomotives and to free-up more engineering space at Cowlairs Works. They were closed in 1994 but the depot site was redeveloped in 2005 and is once again in use as a maintenance facility for Class 170 trains by First ScotRail.

== Production ==
The first few locomotives were bought in, but in 1844, William Paton produced the 0-6-0 Hercules numbered 21 and Samson numbered 22. The two locomotives were used for trials as banking engines on the 1 in 42 Cowlairs incline that started as soon as the trains left Queen Street station. The two 0-6-0s were two of the world's most powerful locomotives at the time; so powerful that it was said that they caused severe damage to the track and the lining of the tunnel. The trials that began in 1844 went on until 1847 when they were stopped and the two locomotives were sold off. From then until 1909, the incline used cable haulage to assist trains; banking resumed in 1909 and continued until the withdrawal of type 2 diesels around 1980.

After the NBR amalgamated into the London and North Eastern Railway at the 1923 Grouping, new production finished, except for boilers and castings, such as brake blocks.

== War work ==
During World War II, like the North British Locomotive Company, both Cowlairs and St. Rollox joined in the war effort producing, among other things, Airspeed Horsa gliders for the D Day airborne assault. Cowlairs also produced 200,000 bearing shells for Rolls-Royce Merlin engines.

== Nationalisation and subsequent closure ==
At nationalisation, into British Railways in 1948, most of the work was transferred to Horwich railway works.

Cowlairs closed in 1968, the work transferring to the other British Rail Engineering Limited site at St. Rollox railway works.

== Reuse of the site for railway purposes ==
The former site of the Eastfield Running Sheds was redeveloped in 2005 and is once again in use as a maintenance depot for Class 170 trains run by First ScotRail.

A new £200 million Network Rail signalling centre and maintenance depot was opened in December 2008 on the former site of Cowlairs carriage sidings, which were located opposite the works on the other side of the main railway line. A total of 450 staff relocated to the new facilities. The new signalling centre replaced the previous 45-year-old system. The maintenance depot replaced existing bases, including Cathcart, Lenzie and Shields Road.

The former site of the main Cowlairs works itself was converted into the Carlisle Street Business Park and Cowlairs Industrial Estate, which has been partly occupied by a Bowmore Whisky bottling plant and some other light industrial units.

There are 2 preserved steam locomotives built by Cowlairs.

- NBR G Class 0-4-0ST No. 42 of 1887, preserved at the Bo'ness and Kinneil Railway
- NBR K Class 4-4-0 No. 256 of 1913, preserved at the Riverside Museum
