= William Christie (astronomer) =

British astronomer (1845–1922)

Sir William Christie KCB FRS
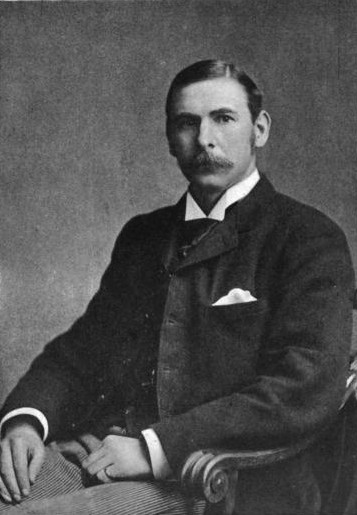
- Born: 1 October 1845; Woolwich, London, England
- Died: 22 January 1922 (aged 76); At sea near Gibraltar
- Education: Trinity College, Cambridge
- Known for: Astronomer Royal
- Scientific career
- Fields: Astronomy

8th Astronomer Royal
- In office 1881–1910
- Preceded by: George Biddell Airy
- Succeeded by: Frank Dyson

Sir William Henry Mahoney Christie KCB FRS (1 October 1845 – 22 January 1922) was a British astronomer.

He was born in Woolwich, London, the son of Samuel Hunter Christie and educated at King's College School and Trinity College, Cambridge. He was fourth wrangler in 1868 and was elected a fellow of Trinity in 1869.

Having been Chief Assistant at the Royal Observatory at Greenwich from 1870 to 1881, he was appointed to replace George Airy as the eighth Astronomer Royal in 1881 and remained in office until 1910. He received the degree D.Sc. (honoris causa) from the University of Oxford in June 1902, and was created a Knight Commander of the Order of the Bath (KCB) in 1904. He was elected a Fellow of the Royal Society in June, 1881. He was president of the Royal Astronomical Society from 1888 to 1890.

The first Astronomer Royal to retire at 65 (all previous incumbents bar Airy and John Pond had died in office; John Pond had been forced by poor health to resign in 1835, while Airy retired aged 81), Christie died and was buried at sea near Gibraltar in 1922. He had married in 1881 Mary Violette, daughter of Sir Alfred Hickman.
