= Mount Pond =

Mountain in Antarctica

Coordinates: 62°57′S 60°33′W

Mount Pond is a peak, 550 m (1,800 ft) in height, standing 2.8 km (1.7 mi) east-south-east of Pendulum Cove, on Deception Island in the South Shetland Islands of Antarctica. The name appears on an 1829 chart based upon survey work by the British expedition under Foster, 1828–31. It was probably named for John Pond, noted English astronomer and director of the Royal Observatory at Greenwich at that time.

== Antarctic Specially Protected Area ==
The peak forms part of an Antarctic Specially Protected Area (ASPA 140), comprising several separate sites on Deception Island, and designated as such primarily for its botanic and ecological values.
