= NBR 141 Class =

Class of British steam locomotives

Type and origin
- Power type: Steam
- Designer: Thomas Wheatley
- Builder: NBR, Cowlairs
- Build date: 1869
- Total produced: 2
Specifications
- Configuration
  - Whyte: 2-4-0
- Gauge: 4 ft 8 1/2 in (1,435 mm)
- Leading dia.: 4 ft 0 in (1,220 mm)
- Driver dia.: 6 ft 6 in (1,980 mm)
- Fuel type: Coal
- Water cap.: 1,650 imp gal (7,500 L)
- Cylinders: Two, inside
- Cylinder size: 16 in × 24 in (406 mm × 610 mm)
Career
- Operators: North British Railway
- Class: 141
- Number in class: 2
- Numbers: 141, 164
- Withdrawn: 1915
- Scrapped: 1923
- Disposition: All scrapped

The NBR 141 Class consisted of two steam 2-4-0 locomotives built by the North British Railway (NBR) in 1869. They were the direct antecedents of the NBR 224 Class 4-4-0.

== History ==
Thomas Wheatley became locomotive superintendent of the North British Railway (NBR) at the start of February 1867. During his tenure of seven years, he provided the NBR with 185 new locomotives; but only eight of these were suitable for hauling express passenger trains, the first two of which were these 2-4-0s, nos. 141 and 164, which were built in 1869; the remaining six were the 4-4-0s of the 224 and 420 Classes, introduced in 1871 and 1873 respectively.

Originally the 141 Class had leading wheels of 4 feet 0 inches (1.22 m) diameter, coupled wheels of 6 feet 6 inches (1.98 m) diameter, and cylinders measuring 16 by 24 inches (406 by 610 mm). The boilers were domeless, with the safety-valves mounted above the firebox. The frames were single, the driving wheel splashers had eight slots; there was no cab, but a weatherboard with two circular windows. The six-wheel tender held 1,650 imperial gallons (7,500 L) of water. They were very good locomotives, and when the cylinder diameter was increased by 1 inch (25 mm), the performance was not adversely affected.

=== Rebuilding ===
On the NBR, locomotives were generally rebuilt when their boilers wore out. Matthew Holmes, locomotive superintendent of the NBR between 1882 and 1903, rebuilt both locomotives in 1890; amongst the improvements were a domed boiler, Westinghouse brake and a cab. In later years, no. 141 was used on trains between Glasgow and Dundee.

=== Final years ===
Every six months, the NBR renumbered some of its older locomotives into a "duplicate list", in order to vacate numbers for new construction. Accordingly, in 1912, nos. 141 and 164 were placed on the duplicate list, becoming nos. 1158/60 respectively. They were both withdrawn from service in 1915 and scrapped in 1923.

== Summary ==
Original number	Built	Rebuilt	Renumbered (year)	Withdrawn
141	1869	1890	1158 (1912)	1915
164	1869	1890	1160 (1912)	1915

The locomotives may have been named after 1875 – it has been stated that Drummond, who replaced Wheatley in 1875, named NBR engines "including those already in service".
