= NBR 224 and 420 Classes =

Two classes of British 4-4-0 locomotives

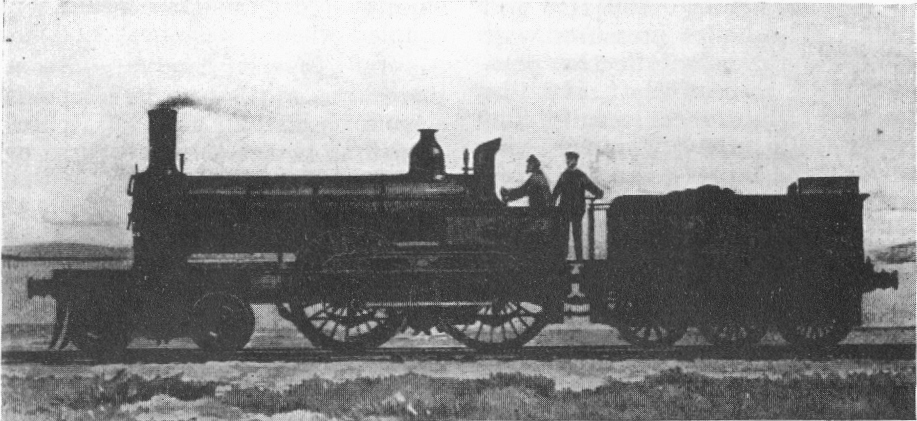
- 224 Class, as built
Type and origin
- Power type: Steam
- Designer: Thomas Wheatley
- Builder: NBR, Cowlairs
- Build date: 1871 (224 Class); 1873 (420 Class)
- Total produced: 2 (224 Class); 4 (420 Class)
Specifications
- Configuration
  - Whyte: 4-4-0
- Gauge: 4 ft 8 1/2 in (1,435 mm)
- Leading dia.: 2 ft 9 in (840 mm) (224 Class); 3 ft 4 in (1,020 mm) (420 Class)
- Driver dia.: 6 ft 6 in (1,980 mm)
- Wheelbase: 20 ft 3 3/8 in (6,182 mm) (224 Class)
- Adhesive weight: 24.45 long tons (24.84 t) (224 Class)
- Loco weight: 38 long tons (39 t) (224 Class); 37.75 long tons (38.36 t) (420 Class)
- Fuel type: Coal
- Water cap.: 1,652 imp gal (7,510 L)
- Firebox
  - Grate area: 15.75 sq ft (1.463 m^{2}) (224 Class)
- Heating surface
  - Firebox: 87 sq ft (8.1 m^{2}) (224 Class)
  - Tubes: 894 sq ft (83.1 m^{2}) (224 Class)
  - Total surface: 981 sq ft (91.1 m^{2}) (224 Class)
- Cylinders: Two, inside
- Cylinder size: 17 in × 24 in (432 mm × 610 mm)
Career
- Operators: North British Railway
- Numbers: 224, 264, 420–3
- Withdrawn: 1914–19
- Disposition: All scrapped

The NBR 224 and 420 Classes consisted of six steam locomotives of the 4-4-0 wheel arrangement built by the North British Railway (NBR) in 1871 and 1873. No. 224 had three claims to fame: it was the first inside-cylinder 4-4-0 engine to run in Great Britain; it was the locomotive involved in the Tay Bridge disaster; and after rebuilding in 1885, it was the only compound-expansion locomotive on the NBR, and one of just three tandem compounds in Britain.

Intended for express passenger trains on the Edinburgh–Glasgow, Edinburgh–Carlisle, and Burntisland–Dundee routes, they handled these well. When trains from London to Edinburgh began to be forwarded via Carlisle over the NBR in mid-1876, these heavier trains were beyond the locomotives' capabilities, and they had to be removed from front-line service on the Carlisle line. Rebuilt between 1885 and 1897, they remained in service until 1914–19.

== History ==
Thomas Wheatley became locomotive superintendent of the North British Railway (NBR) at the start of February 1867. During his tenure of seven years, he provided the NBR with 185 new locomotives; but only eight of these were suitable for hauling express passenger trains, the first two of which were 2-4-0s built in 1869 (the 141 Class), which were considered to be very good engines.

In 1871, Wheatley followed these with two 4-4-0s, nos. 224 and 264, which were built at the NBR's Cowlairs locomotive works. These two locomotives formed the 224 Class. A leading bogie was chosen because of the preponderance of sharp curves on the NBR; the bogie wheels were quite small, at 2 ft 9 in (840 mm) diameter, and had solid centres, without spokes. The bogie centre was fixed, as opposed to the Adams type used later by the NBR, and the bogie wheelbase was 6 ft 0 in (1,830 mm). The coupled wheels were 6 ft 6 in (1,980 mm) diameter, and the other principal dimensions were: cylinders 17 in (430 mm) diameter by 24 in (610 mm) stroke; coupled wheelbase 7 ft 7 in (2,310 mm).

No. 224 was the first inside-frame inside-cylinder 4-4-0 to run in Great Britain, and predated the G&SWR 6 Class by some two years, the latter being introduced in July 1873. This layout, the 4-4-0 with inside frames and inside cylinders, became widespread across most of Great Britain, with the Great Western Railway being the only main-line company which did not eventually possess the type. There had been earlier 4-4-0 designs on other railways, but these either had outside cylinders (such as nos. 160 & 161 (built 1860) of the Stockton and Darlington Railway) or outside frames (such as the "Whitby Bogies" (1864–65) of the North Eastern Railway).

The 224 Class were used on express passenger trains, no. 264 being used both on the Waverley Route between Edinburgh and Carlisle and on the line between Edinburgh and Glasgow. No. 224 was used in Fife, which in the days before the construction of the Forth Bridge, was an isolated part of the NBR system.

The 224 Class were followed in 1873 by the four locomotives of Wheatley's 420 Class, nos. 420–3. These differed from the 224 Class in several respects: the bogie wheels were 3 ft 4 in (1,020 mm) diameter instead of 2 ft 9 in (840 mm); the coupled wheelbase was 7 ft 9 in (2,360 mm) instead of 7 ft 7 in (2,310 mm); the dome was mounted on the boiler barrel instead of the firebox; and the rear wheel splashers were shaped to the wheel instead of being square-topped. They were intended for use on the Waverley route, over which an increase of traffic was anticipated: the Midland Railway (MR) were at the time building their Settle–Carlisle line. This route not yet being open, and the English traffic being entirely in the hands of the London and North Western Railway which worked closely in tandem with the Caledonian Railway, the NBR's main rival, the trains over the Waverley route were comparatively light and well within the capabilities of the 420 Class.

The MR opened the Settle and Carlisle line on 1 May 1876, and a through service using that route between London St Pancras and Edinburgh Waverley was introduced at the same time. There were two trains each day in each direction – one in the daytime, and one overnight. North of Carlisle, the trains were operated by the NBR over their Waverley route. Each company used its own locomotives over their respective lines, and initially the locomotives used by the NBR were the 420 Class, no. 421 being equipped with the Westinghouse brake (as were three other locomotives at a cost of £90, or £8,980 as of 2025, (Note: UK Consumer Price Index inflation figures from 1209–2024 based on data from "Inflation calculator". Bank of England. London. 18 February 2026.) per engine), the brake with which MR carriages were then fitted. But these locomotives proved insufficiently powerful, a second engine often being needed to assist in climbing the gradients, particularly those at Falahill (between Tynehead and Heriot) and at Whitrope (between Shankend and Riccarton Junction). Wheatley's successor, Dugald Drummond, offered the opinion that NBR express locomotives of the period were "like skinny chickens, all legs and wings". As a result, Drummond designed a new class of 4-4-0 (the 476 Class) which began to displace the Wheatley 4-4-0s from the through trains in 1877, and which were capable of maintaining the schedule of 2 hr 35 min for 98 miles (158 km) (with three intermediate stops). The 420 Class remained on the Waverley route, but were used on the local trains, which were lighter than the through trains from England.

=== No. 224 and the Tay Bridge disaster ===
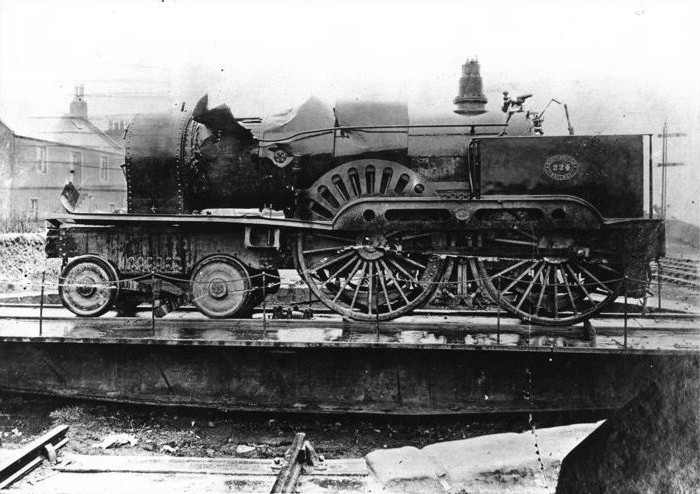
No. 224 following its recovery from the Firth of Tay in 1880

Until the opening of the Forth Bridge in 1890, passengers from Edinburgh to Dundee would cross the Firth of Forth by a ferry from Granton which connected with trains at Burntisland. Further north, the Firth of Tay had been bridged in 1878, and trains could travel through from Burntisland to Dundee and onward to Aberdeen.

On 28 December 1879, the regular engine for the 1.30 p.m. mail train from Dundee to Burntisland (no. 89 Ladybank of the 88 Class, an 0-4-2T) failed, and no. 224 (which was based at Dundee, and spare at the time) was called out to work the train. It did so without incident on the southbound run, but when working the 5.20 p.m. northbound service later in the day, due to arrive at Dundee a little before 7.30, it was on the Tay Bridge when shortly after 7.13 p.m. the latter collapsed. The driver, David Mitchell, and "stoker" (fireman), John Marshall, of no. 224 had no warning of the impending disaster, and neither closed the regulator nor applied the brakes; they were among the 75 people killed. Despite the fall, the locomotive was relatively undamaged, being protected by the bridge girders which formed a cage around the train as they fell together.

In April 1880, an attempt to recover the locomotive failed when the chains broke. Two days later, a second attempt also failed because the salvage equipment broke after the locomotive had been brought to the surface. One week later, it was recovered, and stood on the bank of the Tay until it was sent to Cowlairs on its own wheels for repairs, after which it was returned to traffic. It gained the nickname "The Diver" as a result of its accident and difficult recovery.

After this, drivers refused to take no. 224 across the second Tay Bridge (which was built to a new design and opened in 1887). However, on the 29th anniversary of the disaster, 28 December 1908, no. 224 was used on the Sunday evening mail to Dundee via the Tay Bridge.

=== Rebuilding ===
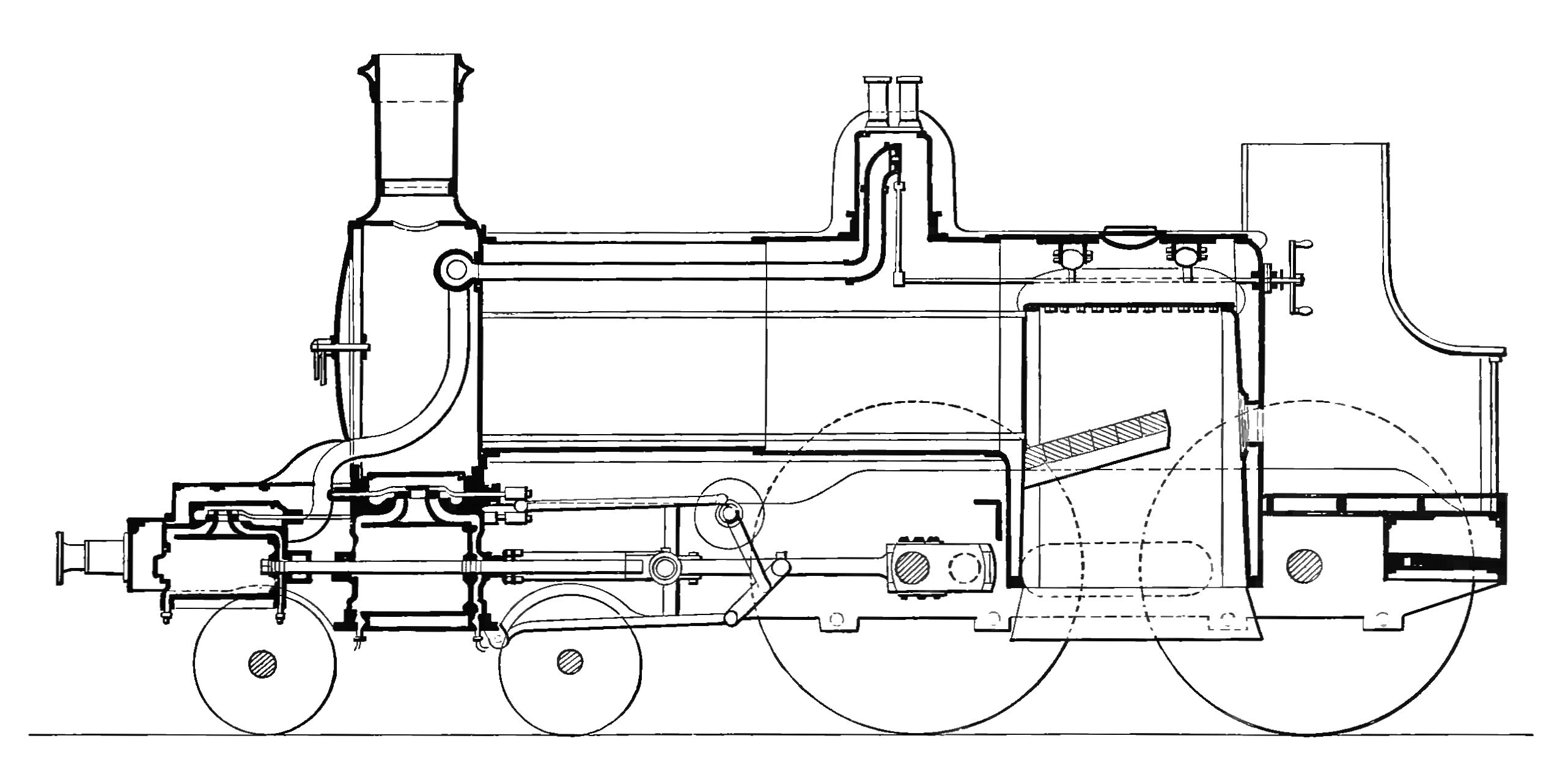
Nisbet's rebuilt locomotive of 1885

Matthew Holmes, locomotive superintendent of the NBR between 1882 and 1903, rebuilt no. 224 as a four-cylinder tandem compound in 1885. In this form, the low-pressure cylinders, which were 20 in (510 mm) diameter, were mounted in the position previously occupied by the original cylinders, above the bogie centre; and the high-pressure cylinders, which were of diameter 13 inches (330 mm), were placed in front of these; the common stroke remained at 24 in (610 mm). The engine was given Joy valve gear with a single shared gear for high and low pressure, but separate rods to the valves, allowing independent control of cutoff. The boiler pressure was 140 pounds per square inch (970 kPa), and the grate area 16.6 sq ft (1.54 m^{2}). The chief features of the design had been patented (no. 16,967 of 1884) by W.H. Nesbit (or Nisbet), who was a cousin of Holmes. Although not entirely successful, it did somewhat better than the only two other British tandem compounds – Great Western Railway nos. 7 & 8, of 1886; although the tandem compound system was more widely used in the USA and Russia. No. 224 was rebuilt back into simple expansion form during 1887.

On the NBR, locomotives were generally rebuilt when their boilers wore out. No. 224 received two new boilers in the course of its life: one was fitted by Drummond, the other by Holmes. Holmes ultimately rebuilt all of the locomotives: other than no. 224, nos. 420/1 were rebuilt in 1887, nos. 422/3 in 1890 and no. 264 in 1893. No. 224 then received its third rebuilding in 1897. In later years, no. 224 was used on secondary and branch line trains.

=== Final years ===
Every six months, the NBR renumbered some of its older locomotives into a "duplicate list", in order to vacate numbers for new construction. Accordingly, in 1913, nos. 224 and 264 were placed on the duplicate list, becoming nos. 1192/8 respectively; nos. 420–3 were similarly treated in 1914, becoming 1241–4 in the same order. No. 1244 was withdrawn from service in 1914, the others following in 1915 (no. 1241), 1917 (no. 1198), 1918 (nos. 1242/3) and 1919 (no. 1192). These were the only classes of 4-4-0 on the NBR to be completely withdrawn before the 1923 Grouping. As such, they were not among the 183 locomotives of this wheel arrangement which were passed by the NBR to the London and North Eastern Railway when the latter company was formed at the start of 1923 by the amalgamation of the NBR with several other railways.

The number plate from the tender of no. 224 has been preserved at Selkirk Museum.

== Summary ==
| Original number | Class | Built | Rebuilt | Renumbered (year) | Withdrawn |
|---|---|---|---|---|---|
| 224 | 224 | 1871 | 1885, 1887, 1897 | 1192 (1913) | 1919 |
| 264 | 224 | 1871 | 1893 | 1198 (1913) | 1917 |
| 420 | 420 | 1873 | 1887 | 1241 (1914) | 1915 |
| 421 | 420 | 1873 | 1887 | 1242 (1914) | 1918 |
| 422 | 420 | 1873 | 1890 | 1243 (1914) | 1918 |
| 423 | 420 | 1873 | 1890 | 1244 (1914) | 1914 |

The locomotives may have been named after 1875 – it has been stated that Drummond, who replaced Wheatley in 1875, named NBR engines "including those already in service".
