= Michele Dougherty =

British space scientist (born 1962)

Michele Dougherty CBE FRS FRAS
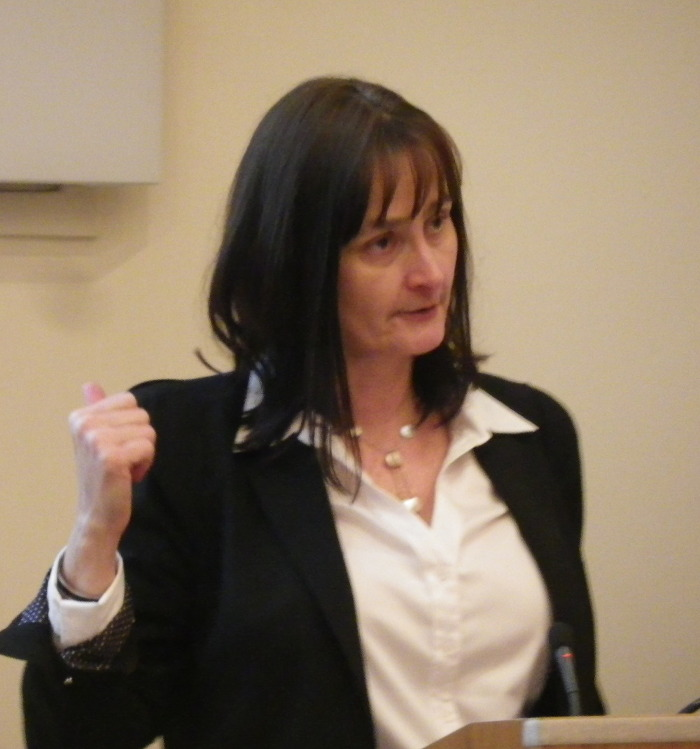
- Dougherty in April 2015

16th Astronomer Royal
- Incumbent
- Assumed office 2025
- Preceded by: Martin Rees

Personal details
- Born: Michele Karen Dougherty; 1962 KwaZulu-Natal, South Africa
- Website: profiles.imperial.ac.uk/m.dougherty
- Scientific career
- Education: University of Natal
- Known for: Magnetometer instrumentation for the Cassini-Huygens mission
- Awards: Hughes Medal (2008); Gold Medal of the Royal Astronomical Society (2017)
- Fields: Geophysics; Space physics
- Workplaces: Imperial College London

Michele Karen Dougherty (born 1962) is a British scientist. She is professor of space physics at Imperial College London and the sixteenth Astronomer Royal. She is leading uncrewed exploratory missions to Saturn and Jupiter, and is principal investigator for J-MAG – a magnetometer aboard the European Space Agency's Jupiter Icy Moons Explorer.

She was appointed to Executive Chair of the Science and Technology Facilities Council in September 2024, and was appointed Astronomer Royal in July 2025, making her the first woman in that office. She was elected to serve as President of the Institute of Physics from October 2025 but stepped down in January 2026 citing concerns of a conflict of interest with her role at STFC.

== Early life and education ==
Michele Dougherty became interested in space when she was ten years old, when her father built a 10-inch telescope through which she saw the moons of Jupiter and Saturn. Dougherty learnt no science at secondary school, as the one she attended, chosen because 'I thought, I want to go [to the same school] with my friends', did not teach science. Nonetheless, her ability at mathematics led to her admission to read for a science degree (which 'was like learning a new language') at the University of Natal in South Africa, where she was awarded a PhD degree in 1988 for research on wave-particle interactions in dispersive and anisotropic media.

== Career ==
Dougherty left South Africa for a fellowship in Germany, working on applied mathematics, before moving to Imperial College London in 1991. She was appointed a Professor of Space Physics in 2004 and teaches undergraduates alongside her research. She was head of the Department of Physics at Imperial College London from 2018 to 2024.

Dougherty is the principal investigator for two major space missions; the NASA Cassini spacecraft that orbited Saturn and the ESA JUICE spacecraft that will orbit Jupiter's largest moon, Ganymede.

Dougherty's work led to the discovery of an atmosphere containing water and hydrocarbons around Saturn's moon Enceladus — opening up new possibilities in the search for extraterrestrial life.

Dougherty is distinguished by the Royal Society "for her scientific leadership of the international NASA-ESA-ASI Cassini-Huygens mission to Saturn and its moons". As principal investigator of the operation, data collection and analysis of observations from the magnetic field instrument on board the Cassini spacecraft, she strongly contributed to improve our understanding of Saturn and the Moons of Saturn. Dougherty cites the flybys of Saturn's moons as a highlight of her career; convincing the NASA spacecraft team to make a closer than usual approach “I watched the data coming back with my heart in my mouth because if we had messed up no one would have ever believed me again!".

Before working on the Cassini-Huygens spacecraft, Dougherty was involved in the magnetometer team for the Jupiter analysis of the Ulysses mission. She was also Guest Investigator on the NASA Jupiter System Data Analysis Program as part of the Galileo uncrewed spacecraft.

Dougherty regularly delivers public lectures and appears on national media. She was one of the guest scientists interviewed on Jim Al-Khalili's radio programme The Life Scientific.

In July 2025, Dougherty was appointed the UK's Astronomer Royal. She is the first woman in the post's 350-year history.

== Awards and honours ==
In 2007, Dougherty won the Chree Medal and Prize from the Institute of Physics for "her contributions to the field of planetary magnetic fields and atmospheres and their interactions with the solar wind".

Dougherty won the 2008 Hughes Medal of the Royal Society "for innovative use of magnetic field data that led to discovery of an atmosphere around one of Saturn's moons and the way it revolutionised our view of the role of planetary moons in the Solar System". She is the second woman ever to receive such an accolade, 102 years after Hertha Ayrton.

Dougherty was elected a Fellow of the Royal Society in 2012 and was recognized by the UK Science Council as one of the 100 top UK living scientists. She was awarded a prestigious Royal Society Research Professorship in 2014.

Dougherty was awarded the Gold Medal of the Royal Astronomical Society for geophysics in 2017, the fifth woman ever to receive the honour.

Dougherty has contributed significantly to the UK space sector, and chaired the Science Programme Advisory Committee of the UK Space Agency between 2014 and 2016. She was made Commander of the Order of the British Empire (CBE) in the 2018 New Year Honours for "services to UK Physical Science Research". Dougherty won the 2018 Richard Glazebrook Medal and Prize from the Institute of Physics. In 2019, Dougherty was named a Fellow of the American Geophysical Union.

In February 2026, Dougherty guested on BBC radio’s Desert Island Discs when she said the one record she would save from the waves is Elgar’s Cello Concerto in E Minor because it features the instrument she feels makes the most beautiful music.

== See also ==
- List of women in leadership positions on astronomical instrumentation projects
- Timeline of women in science
