= Astronomer Royal =

Position in the Royal Households of the United Kingdom

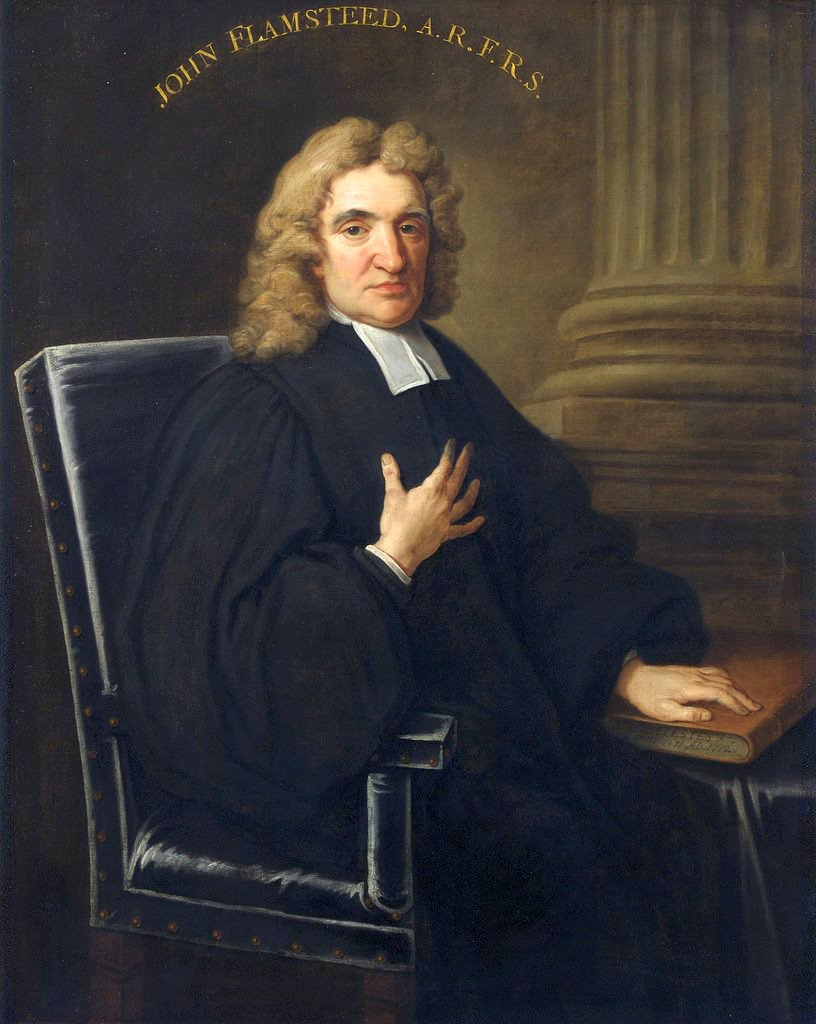
John Flamsteed, the first astronomer royal, by Thomas Gibson. Royal Society, London.

Astronomer Royal is a senior post in the Royal Households of the United Kingdom. There are two officers, the senior being the astronomer royal dating from 22 June 1675; the junior is the astronomer royal for Scotland dating from 1834.

The astronomer royal's works have included making observations to improve navigation, cartography, instrument design, and applications of geomagnetism. The position was created with the goal of discovering a way to determine longitude at sea when out of sight of land. It is now a largely honorary role. The incumbent astronomer royal is Michele Dougherty.

== History ==
The post was created by Charles II in 1675, when he founded the Royal Observatory, Greenwich. He appointed John Flamsteed, instructing him "forthwith to apply himself with the most exact care and diligence to the rectifying the tables of the motions of the heavens, and the places of the fixed stars, so as to find out the so-much desired longitude of places, for the perfecting the art of navigation." The first six Astronomers Royal dedicated themselves primarily to this task and focused on astronomical observations that would benefit navigation.

The Astronomer Royal was director of the Royal Observatory, Greenwich from the establishment of the post in 1675 until 1972. The Astronomer Royal became an honorary title without executive responsibilities in 1972, and a separate post of Director of the Royal Greenwich Observatory was created to manage the institution.

The origin of the title Astronomer Royal is unknown. Although Flamsteed is widely considered the first Astronomer Royal, he was never appointed with that title and only referred to in the Warrant to Ordinance as "Our Astronomical Observer". Similar language was used to appoint all the Astronomers Royal until 1881 with William Christie's appointment. The term Astronomer Royal did not become commonly used until the late 18th Century while the Royal Warrants still used "Our Astronomical Observer". Other titles such as Royal Professor at Greenwich were also used in less formal documents during this time.

In 1703, Isaac Newton was elected President of the Royal Society, and was upset with the lack of publications coming from the Greenwich Observatory under Flamsteed. This eventually led to Queen Anne's Warrant of 1710 where members of the Royal Society were appointed as the Board of Visitors to the Royal Observatory to oversee Flamsteed. The original Board of Visitors consisted entirely of associates and allies of Newton, which enraged Flamsteed.

In 1765, the Board of Longitude decided that the Astronomer Royal's observations were the property of the Crown and must be printed and published each year. John Pond and subsequent Astronomers Royal elected to publish their findings quarterly instead.

Sir George Airy transformed the position from its original purpose of improving navigation to conducting more general astronomical and scientific research. With approval from the Board of Visitors in 1836, Airy created a Magnetic and Meteorological Department in the Royal Observatory Greenwich. Following this, in 1873 he created the Solar Photography Department.

Astronomers Royal are responsible for many different discoveries and theories. They had several assistants who aided work at the Royal Observatory, Greenwich. There were also computers, or people that would perform all the mathematical computations required to make observations comparable. In the 19th century, many of these computers were boys and a few were women.

Originally, the Astronomer Royal had one assistant but increased to six during John Pond's tenure as Astronomer Royal. The astronomer royal today receives a stipend of 100 GBP per year and is a member of the royal household, under the general authority of the Lord Chamberlain. After the separation of the two offices of Astronomer Royal and Director of the Royal Greenwich Observatory, the position of astronomer royal has been largely honorary, although the holder remains available to advise the Sovereign on astronomical and related scientific matters, and the office is of great prestige.

There was formerly a Royal Astronomer of Ireland who was also the Andrews Professor of Astronomy at the University of Dublin. Both became vacant in 1921 with Irish Independence but a new Andrews Professor of Astronomy was appointed in 1985.

== Astronomers Royal ==
#	Image	Name	Start year	End year	Reference
1.		John Flamsteed	1675	1719	
2.		Edmond Halley	1720	1742	
3.		James Bradley	1742	1762	
4.		Nathaniel Bliss	1762	1764	
5.		Nevil Maskelyne	1765	1811	
6.		John Pond	1811	1835	
7.		Sir George Biddell Airy	1835	1881	
8.		Sir William Christie	1881	1910	
9.		Sir Frank Dyson	1910	1933	
10.		Sir Harold Spencer Jones	1933	1955	
11.		Sir Richard van der Riet Woolley	1956	1971	
12.		Sir Martin Ryle	1972	1982	
13.		Sir Francis Graham-Smith	1982	1990	
14.		Sir Arnold Wolfendale	1991	1995	
15.		Martin Rees, Baron Rees of Ludlow	1995	2025	
16.		Michele Dougherty	2025	Incumbent	

== Discoveries and works of Astronomers Royal ==
John Flamsteed is responsible for a few important discoveries including proving his theory of annual stellar parallax and the discovery of the planet Uranus, even though he thought it was a star. In 1694, he gathered evidence of the stellar parallax and became the first person to prove that the Earth revolves around the sun. However, his most significant contribution to the Royal Observatory and later to the Astronomers Royal was his high standard of work.

Six years after the death of Flamsteed, Historia Coelestis Britannica was published containing much of the data and theories he had spent his life working on both before and after his appointment as Astronomer Royal. It contains accurate tables of lunar motion, planetary motion, and detailed stellar catalog of 2935 stars. This publication made the Astronomer Royal and the Royal Observatory, Greenwich internationally renown for precise observation.

Edmond Halley was determined to find a way to find longitude at sea without sight of land. Starting in 1725, Halley while serving as Astronomer Royal and a Commissioner on the Board of Longitude made very detailed and precise observations of the moon. From these observations he was able to show that longitude could be calculated using the moon in 1731. Although the error in his calculations was about 69 miles at the equator, it was more accurate than any other methods until the use of the marine chronometer for finding longitude.

In 1833, John Pond published his catalog of 1113 stars. The catalog contained more stars recorded to a higher accuracy than any other existing publication, and impressed astronomers across Europe.

Another important Astronomer Royal was Sir George Biddell Airy. While still in college at Trinity College, Cambridge, he noticed he was having trouble reading with his left eye. Eventually, his condition would be classified as an astigmatism, but at the time, there was no cure that worked for everyone. After consulting with others who had the same condition, he crafted a lens to refract the light rays and correct the astigmatism. With his experience working with lenses, he spent considerable time as the Astronomer Royal improving the measuring instruments in the Royal Observatory, Greenwich. Using these improved instruments, he meticulously double-checked measurements and discoveries made by past astronomers.

Frank Dyson, the ninth Astronomer Royal, determined latitude variation caused by irregular movement of Earth's magnetic poles. He used a telescope floating in mercury and was able to detect when the poles of the earth wobbled greater than one foot. During the 1919 eclipse, Dyson was crucial in designing the Eddington experiment with Arthur Eddington to test Albert Einstein's theory of relativity. Starting months before the eclipse, stars were photographed and carefully charted, and during the total eclipse the same stars would be photographed and charted again. If Einstein's theory was correct then the light from the selected stars would be bent passing around the sun and show more deflection than Newtonian theory alone predicted. When the photographs from the eclipse were developed it became clear that Einstein's theory had accurately predicted the position of stars. This was one of the first experiments to confirm general relativity.

== In popular culture ==
The astronomer royal is mentioned in H. G. Wells' novel The War of the Worlds, in George Orwell's Down and Out in Paris and London, and in Thomas Pynchon's novel Mason & Dixon. He also makes an appearance in the lyrics of Gilbert and Sullivan's The Pirates of Penzance and plays an important role in Fred Hoyle's novel The Black Cloud.
