= Thomas Wheatley =

English railway engineer (1821–1883)

Thomas Wheatley (locomotive engineer)
- Born: 1821; Micklefield, Leeds
- Died: 13 March 1883 (aged 61–62); Wigtownshire
- Engineering career
- Discipline: Mechanical engineering

Thomas Wheatley (1821–1883) was an English mechanical engineer who worked for several British railway companies and rose to become a Locomotive Superintendent at the London and North Western Railway (LNWR) and the North British Railway (NBR).

== Career ==
He became an apprentice with the Leeds and Selby Railway and later worked for the Midland Railway and the Manchester, Sheffield and Lincolnshire Railway. Subsequently, he was Locomotive Superintendent for the Southern Division of the London and North Western Railway for 5 years. From 1867 to 1874 he was Locomotive Superintendent of the North British Railway (NBR). Prior to 1867 the post had been split across divisions.

== Locomotives ==
Under Wheatley's superintendency, 185 new locomotives were added to NBR stock, and a number of old engines were rebuilt for further service. Only eight of the new locomotives were intended for express passenger trains. Locomotives designed by Thomas Wheatley included:

NBR class	Power class	Type	Introduced	Driving wheel	Total	Grouping	LNER class	Extinct	Notes
141		2-4-0	1869	6 ft 6 in (1,980 mm)	2			1915	
38		2-4-0	1869	6 ft 0 in (1,830 mm)	1			1912	
418	P	2-4-0	1873	6 ft 0 in (1,830 mm)	8	6	E7	1927	
40		2-4-0	1873	5 ft 0 in (1,520 mm)	2			1903	
224		4-4-0	1871	6 ft 6 in (1,980 mm)	2			1919	
420		4-4-0	1873	6 ft 6 in (1,980 mm)	4			1918	
251	E	0-6-0	1867	4 ft 3 in (1,300 mm)	38	3	J84	1924	
56		0-6-0	1868	5 ft 0 in (1,520 mm)	8			1914	
17		0-6-0	1869	4 ft 6 in (1,370 mm)	1			1914	
396	E	0-6-0	1867	5 ft 0 in (1,520 mm)	88	37	J31	1937	
293		0-6-0	1872	5 ft 0 in (1,520 mm)	1			1907	
357	—	0-4-0	1868	5 ft 3 in (1,600 mm)	2	1	Y10	1925	
226	E	0-6-0ST	1870	5 ft 0 in (1,520 mm)	2	1	J86	1924	
229	E	0-6-0ST	1871	5 ft 0 in (1,520 mm)	15	1	J81	1924	
112		0-6-0ST	1870	4 ft 6 in (1,370 mm)	3			1910	
282		0-6-0ST	1866	4 ft 1 in (1,240 mm)	3			1921	
130	E	0-6-0ST	1870	4 ft 3 in (1,300 mm)	10	1	J85	1924	
32		0-6-0ST	1874	3 ft 6 in (1,070 mm)	6			1907	
18		0-4-0ST	1872	3 ft 0 in (910 mm)	2			1906	

== See also ==
- Locomotives of the North British Railway

== Notes ==
Business positions
Preceded by See above	Locomotive Superintendent of the North British Railway; 1867–1874	Succeeded by Dugald Drummond; 1875–1882
