= John Pond =

English astronomer (1767–1836)

John Pond FRS
- Born: 1767; London, UK
- Died: 7 September 1836 (aged 69); Blackheath, Kent England
- Resting place: St Margaret's, Lee, Kent
- Education: Trinity College, Cambridge
- Known for: Astronomer Royal
- Awards: Lalande Prize (1817); Copley Medal (1823)
- Scientific career
- Fields: Astronomy

6th Astronomer Royal
- In office 1811–1835
- Preceded by: Nevil Maskelyne
- Succeeded by: George Biddell Airy

John Pond FRS (1767 – 7 September 1836) was an English astronomer who became the sixth Astronomer Royal, serving from 1811 to 1835.

== Early life ==
Pond was born in 1767, in London. Pond's father made a fortune as a London merchant, enabling young John to enter Trinity College, Cambridge, in 1784 at the age of sixteen. He took no degree, however, as his course was being interrupted by severe pulmonary attacks which compelled a long residence abroad. He was admitted to the Inner Temple in 1794, but his poor health prompted him to withdraw.

== Career ==
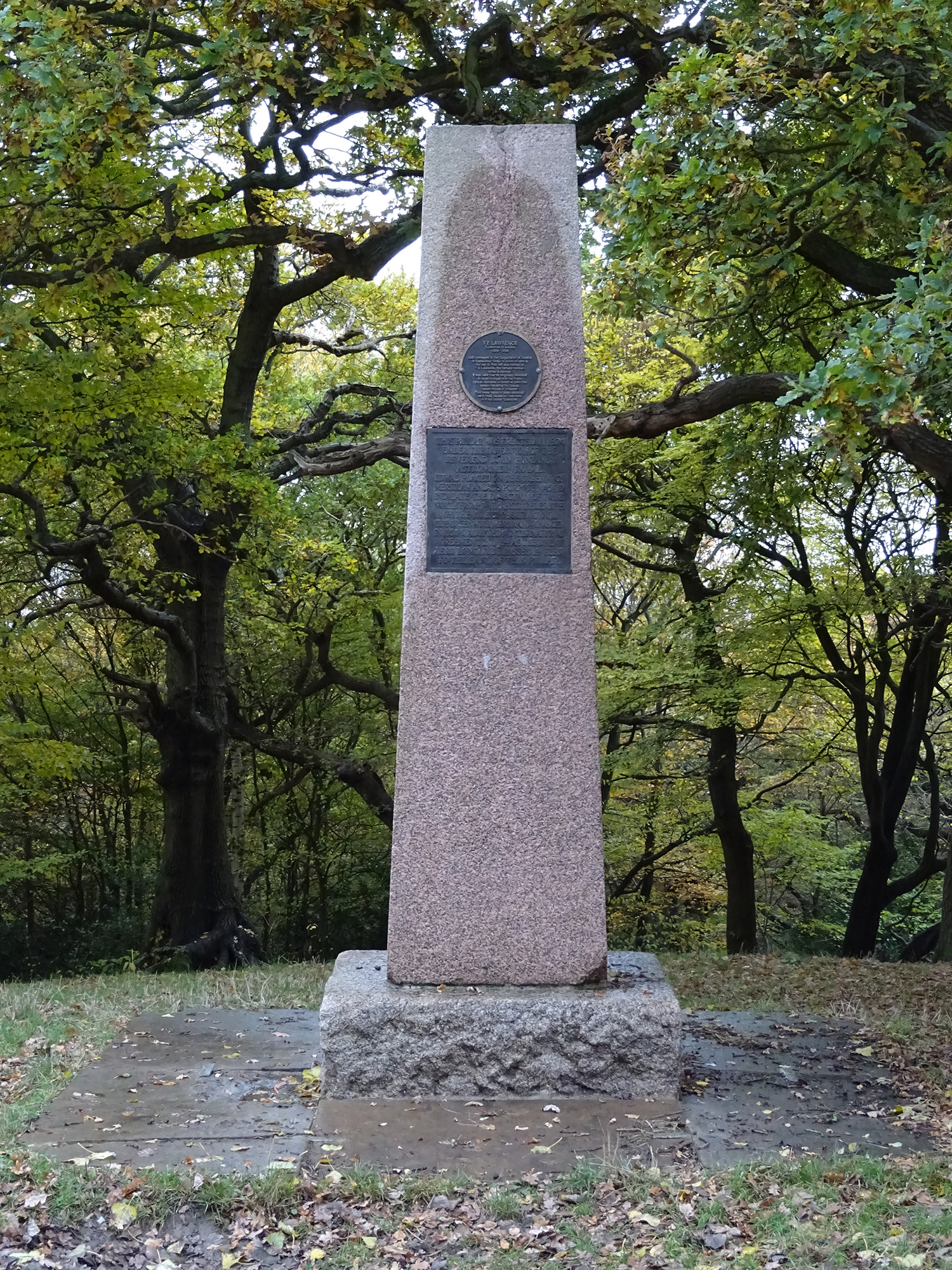
Pole Hill obelisk, erected in 1824 under the direction of Pond

In 1800, Pond settled at Westbury near Bristol, and began to determine star-places with a fine altitude and azimuth circle of 2 1/2 feet (760 mm) in diameter by Edward Troughton. His demonstration in 1806 of a change of form in the Greenwich mural quadrant led to the introduction of astronomical circles at the Royal Greenwich Observatory and to his own appointment as its head. He was elected a fellow of the Royal Society on 26 February 1807. Also in 1807, he married Annie Gordon Bradley (1789–1871) and set up residence in London.

In 1811, Pond succeeded Nevil Maskelyne as Astronomer Royal. During an administration of nearly twenty-five years, he effected a reform of practical astronomy in England comparable to that brought about by Friedrich Bessel in Germany. In 1821, he began to employ the method of observation by reflection and in 1825 devised means of combining two mural circles in the determination of the place of a single object, the one serving for direct and the other for reflected vision. Under his auspices, the instrumental equipment at Greenwich was completely changed and the number of assistants increased from one to six. The superior accuracy of his determinations was attested by Seth Carlo Chandler's 1894 discussion of them in the course of his researches into the variation of latitude. Between 1810 and 1824, he persistently controverted the reality of Ireland's Astronomer Royal John Brinkley's claimed measurements of star-parallaxes. From 1829 to 1831, he briefly served as Superintendent of the Nautical Almanac. Delicacy of health obliged his retirement in the autumn of 1835.

Among his honours were the Lalande Prize, conferred in 1817 by the French Academy of Sciences of which he was a corresponding member, and the Copley Medal, presented in 1823. He was elected a Foreign Honorary Member of the American Academy of Arts and Sciences in 1822. He published eight folio volumes of Greenwich Observations, translated Pierre-Simon Laplace's Système du monde and contributed thirty-one papers to scientific collections. His 1833 catalogue of positions of 1112 stars was of great value and displayed an accuracy which had previously never been achieved.

As Astronomer Royal, Pond was responsible for a substantial modernisation of the Observatory at Greenwich, extending from equipment improvements to new working practices. Perhaps his most noticeable addition was the 1833 installation of the time ball on the roof of the Observatory. Arguably, the first public time signal in the UK, the ball's drop occurs daily at 1:00 p.m. and was intended to aid mariners on the Thames to synchronise their marine chronometers.

Pole Hill in Epping Forest lies directly on the Greenwich meridian and, being the highest point on that bearing directly visible from Greenwich, was at one time used as a marker by geographers at the Royal Observatory to set their telescopes and observation equipment to a true zero degree bearing. On the summit of the hill is an obelisk made of granite and bearing the following inscription:

This pillar was erected in 1824 under the direction of the Reverend John Pond, MA, Astronomer Royal. It was placed on the Greenwich Meridian and its purpose was to indicate the direction of true north from the transit telescope of the Royal Observatory. The Greenwich Meridian as changed in 1850 and adopted by international agreement in 1884 as the line of zero longitude passes 19 feet to the east of this pillar.

John Pond died on 7 September 1836, aged 69, in Blackheath, Kent, and was buried beside and near fellow Astronomers Royal Edmond Halley and Nathaniel Bliss, respectively, in the churchyard of St Margaret's in nearby Lee.

== See also ==
- Pond Inlet, on the north coast of Baffin Island in Nunavut, Canada, was named after Pond by Sir John Ross.
- Mount Pond, Deception Island
