= Locomotives of the Glasgow and South Western Railway =

The locomotives of the Glasgow and South Western Railway (G&SWR). The G&SWR had its headquarters in Glasgow with its main locomotive works in Kilmarnock.

== Engines inherited from constituent companies ==
The G&SWR was formed in 1850 from a merger of the Glasgow, Paisley, Kilmarnock and Ayr Railway (GPK&AR) and the Glasgow, Dumfries and Carlisle Railway (GD&CR). A number of other companies were absorbed by the G&SWR or its predecessors, including the Ardrossan Railway, the Paisley and Renfrew Railway and the Kilmarnock and Troon Railway.

== Engines built by the Glasgow and South Western Railway ==
One notable feature of the G&SWR's locomotive stock was its aversion to tank engines. Until very late on in the company's history these were used only when circumstances absolutely demanded it.

=== Patrick Stirling (1853–1866) ===
See Patrick Stirling

Wheel Arrangement	Class	Date	Builder	No. built	1919 nos.	LMS power classification	LMS nos.	Withdrawn	Notes
2-2-2	95	1855	Neilson	4				1874–75	
2-2-2	2	1857–60	G&SWR Kilmarnock	13				1874–80	
2-2-2	40	1860-4	G&SWR Kilmarnock	10				c.1876–81	
2-2-2	45	1865-8	G&SWR Kilmarnock	11				1884–88	
0-2-2-0	99	1855	R & W Hawthorn	4				1866–67	
2-4-0	94	1854/5	Neilson	1				1866	
2-4-0	109	1858	Beyer-Peacock	1				1874	
0-4-2	105	1856	R & W Hawthorn	4				1875–76	
0-4-2	9	1857	Neilson	7				1874–79	
0-4-2	34	1858-9	R & W Hawthorn	10				1874–76	
0-4-2	23	1860-2	Sharp Stewart	20				1882–89 (rebuilds c.1890–1904)	8 rebuilt as 0-4-2T during 1881–5.
0-4-2	131	1864	R & W Hawthorn	10				1883–95	
0-4-2	141	1866	Neilson	10	656-7	U	17021–2	1902–24 (rebuilds 1900–13)	4 rebuilt as 0-4-2T during 1886–7.
0-4-0	52	1864-6	G&SWR Kilmarnock	6				unknown (after 1895, before 1903)	
0-6-0	103	1855	R & W Hawthorn	2				1871	
0-6-0	46	1862-3	G&SWR Kilmarnock	6				1888–93	
0-6-0	58	1866-7	G&SWR Kilmarnock	6				1890–1915	2 withdrawn 1890, others c.1909 onwards
0-6-0	58	1867-9	Neilson	20	617-24	U	17100	1896–1923	1 withdrawn 1896, others from 1909 onwards

=== James Stirling (1866–1878) ===
See James Stirling

Wheel Arrangement	Class	Date	Builder	No. built	1919 nos.	LMS power classification	LMS nos.	Withdrawn	Notes
2-2-2WT	159	1867	Neilson	1				1877	
2-4-0	8	1868–70	G&SWR Kilmarnock	15				1900–17	
2-4-0	75	1870-1	G&SWR Kilmarnock	10	726-7	1P	14000	1900–23	
0-4-2	187	1870-1	Neilson	20				1897–1917	8 rebuilt as 0-4-2T during 1888–89 (withdrawn 1906–13). 7 renewed as Manson 113 Class in 1900–01.
0-4-2	208	1873	Dübs	10	651-5	U	17023–6	1904–23	
0-4-2	221	1874-8	Neilson	50	635-50	U	17035–45	1901–29	30 renewed as Manson 224 Class in 1901–04, others withdrawn from 1911 onwards
0-4-2	221	1876	Dübs	10	635-50	U	17035–45	1901–29	30 renewed as Manson 224 Class in 1901–04, others withdrawn from 1911 onwards
4-4-0	6	1873-7	G&SWR Kilmarnock	22				1895–1901	16 renewed as Manson 194 Class 1899–1901
0-4-0	65	1871-4	G&SWR Kilmarnock	22	732–3			before 1903 – 1922	
0-4-0ST	157	1867–70	A.Barclay	5				1881-unknown	
0-4-0ST	218	1873	Allen Andrews	2				after 1881	
0-4-0ST	220	1873	A.Barclay	1				1917	Second Hand, purchased 1874 from Glamorgan Coal Co.
0-4-0ST	113	1875-6	G&SWR Kilmarnock	6				unknown	2 withdrawn 1911, others unknown
0-6-0	13	1877-8	G&SWR Kilmarnock	12	563–584 with gaps	1F	17103–11	1898–1928	1 wrecked in 1898, others withdrawn from 1914 onwards

=== Hugh Smellie (1878–1890) ===
See Hugh Smellie

Wheel Arrangement	Class	Date	Builder	No. built	1919 nos.	LMS power classification	LMS nos.	Withdrawn	Notes
2-4-0	157	1879–81	G&SWR Kilmarnock	12	720-5	1P	14001–2	1912–23	
4-4-0	119	1882-5	G&SWR Kilmarnock	24	467–8, 700–719	1P	14116–37	1914–31 (rebuilds 1930–34)	2 withdrawn 1914–15, others from 1925 onwards. 14 rebuilt with Whitelegg "X3" boilers in 1921–2 to become class 2P
4-4-0	153	1886-9	G&SWR Kilmarnock	20	448–466	1P	14138–56	1898–1930 (rebuilds 1929–35)	One locomotive wrecked in 1898, others withdrawn from 1925 onwards. 11 rebuilt with Whitelegg "X3" boilers in 1922–3 to become class 2P
0-4-4T	1	1879–81	G&SWR Kilmarnock	4	728-31	1P	15241–4	1925–26	
0-4-0T	291	1883	A.Barclay	1	734	U	16042	1925	Second hand, purchased 1885, Works shunter
0-4-0ST	218	1881	Andrews, Barr & Co	2	658-9	U	16040–1	1928–32	
0-6-0	22	1881–92	G&SWR Kilmarnock	44	135–9, 560–616 with gaps	1F	17112–64	1915–31 (rebuilds 1932–35)	10 renewed as 281 class in 1911–12 and one more withdrawn in 1915. Others withdrawn from 1924 onwards. 10 rebuilt with Whitelegg "X3" boilers in 1923–5 to become class 2F
0-6-0	22	1883	Neilson	10	135–9, 560–616 with gaps	1F	17112–64	1915–31 (rebuilds 1932–35)	10 renewed as 281 class in 1911–12 and one more withdrawn in 1915. Others withdrawn from 1924 onwards. 10 rebuilt with Whitelegg "X3" boilers in 1923–5 to become class 2F
0-6-0	22	1889	Dübs	10	135–9, 560–616 with gaps	1F	17112–64	1915–31 (rebuilds 1932–35)	10 renewed as 281 class in 1911–12 and one more withdrawn in 1915. Others withdrawn from 1924 onwards. 10 rebuilt with Whitelegg "X3" boilers in 1923–5 to become class 2F

=== James Manson (1890–1911) ===
See James Manson

Wheel Arrangement	Class	Date	Builder	No. built	1919 nos.	LMS power classification	LMS nos.	Withdrawn	Notes
4-4-0	8	1892–1904	G&SWR Kilmarnock	57	377, 396–447	1P	14157–202, 14244–5, 14249–53	1911–32 (rebuilds 1927–33)	Four renewed as 18 or 240 classes in 1911–12, others withdrawn from 1925 onwards. 17 rebuilt with Whitelegg "X1" boilers in 1920–1 to become class 2P
4-4-0	336	1895–99	Dübs	25	350-74	2P	14203–27	1926–32 (rebuilds 1930–32)	6 rebuilt with Whitelegg "X1" boilers in 1920–21
4-4-0	194	1899–1901	G&SWR Kilmarnock	16	469–484	1P	14228–43	1925–30	Renewals of Stirling 6 Class
4-4-0	240	1904–11	G&SWR Kilmarnock	17	375, 378–93	2P	14246–8, 14254–67	1925–32 (rebuilds 1932–34)	2 rebuilt with Whitelegg "X1" boilers in 1920
4-4-0	18	1907–12	G&SWR Kilmarnock	15	337–49, 376, 395	2P	14268–9, 14366–78	1925–32	
4-4-0	11	1897	G&SWR Kilmarnock	1	394	3P	14509	1934	first 4-cylinder simple locomotive in the British Isles. Rebuilt by Drummond in 1915 and again more extensively by Whitelegg in 1922, when named "Lord Glenarthur"
4-6-0	381	1903	North British	10	495–504	3P	14656–65	1927–33	
4-6-0	381	1910–11	G&SWR Kilmarnock	7	505-11	3P	14666–72	1927–33	
4-6-0	128	1911	North British	2	512-3	3P	14673–4	1933–34	
0-4-4T	326	1893	Neilson	10	520–529	1P	15245–54	1930–32	
0-4-4T	266	1906	G&SWR Kilmarnock	6	305-10	U	16080–5	1925–32	
0-4-0T	272	1907–09	G&SWR Kilmarnock	6	316-21	U	16044–9	1930–31	
0-6-0T	14	1896–1914	G&SWR Kilmarnock	15	275-89	1F	16103–17	1928–32	
0-4-2	113	1900–01	G&SWR Kilmarnock	7	268-74	1F	17028–34	1926–30	Renewals of Stirling 187 Class
0-4-2	224	1901–04	G&SWR Kilmarnock	30	238–267	1F	17046–75	1925–31	Renewals of Stirling 221 Class
0-6-0	306	1892–93	Dübs	20	178–197	1F	17165–84	1925–32 (rebuilds 1931–32)	3 rebuilt with Whitelegg "X3" boilers in 1925 to become class 2F
0-6-0	160	1897–99	G&SWR Kilmarnock	18	160–177	1F	17185–202	1925–33 (rebuilds 1929–32)	4 rebuilt with Whitelegg "X3" boilers in 1925–6 to become class 2F
0-6-0	281	1911-2	G&SWR Kilmarnock	10	140-9	2F	17203–12	1927–30	Renewals of Smellie 22 Class
0-6-0	361	1900	Neilson	20	115-34	2F	17474–93	1928–35 (rebuilds 1931–37)	21 rebuilt with Whitelegg "X2" boilers in 1920–4 to become class 3F
0-6-0	361	1907	North British	12	103–114	2F	17494–505	1928–35 (rebuilds 1931–37)	21 rebuilt with Whitelegg "X2" boilers in 1920–4 to become class 3F
0-6-0	361	1910	G&SWR Kilmarnock	2	101-2	2F	17506–7	1928–35 (rebuilds 1931–37)	21 rebuilt with Whitelegg "X2" boilers in 1920–4 to become class 3F
0-6-0	17	1910	North British	15	86–100	2F	17508–22	1930–37 (rebuild 1934)	1 rebuilt with Whitelegg "X2" boiler in 1920 to become class 3F
0-4-0WT Railmotor	G&SWR Railmotor	1904–05	G&SWR Kilmarnock	3				1916	

=== Peter Drummond (1911–1918) ===
See Peter Drummond

Wheel Arrangement	Class	Date	Builder	No. built	1919 nos.	LMS power classification	LMS nos.	Withdrawn	Notes
4-4-0	131	1913	North British	6	331–336	3P	14510–5	1934–37	
4-4-0	137	1915	G&SWR Kilmarnock	6	325–330	3P	14516–21	1934–37	
0-6-0T	5	1917	North British	3	322–324	2F	16377–9	1934	
0-6-2T	45	1915–17	North British	18	11–28	3F	16410–27 (later 16910–27)	1936–47	
0-6-0	279	1913	North British	15	71–85	4F	17750–64	1930–33	
2-6-0	403	1915	North British	11	51–61	4F	17820–30	1935–47	"Austrian Goods"
0-4-4ST	GB&KJR	1873	Dübs	1	537			1922	Glasgow, Barrhead and Kilmarnock Joint Railway No. 1, nominally taken into G&SWR stock 1913. Not believed to have ever received G&SWR livery or carried its G&SWR number.
0-4-0ST	G&PJR	1887	Neilson	2	736–737	U	16050–51	1924	Glasgow and Paisley Joint Railway Nos. 1 and 2, nominally taken into G&SWR stock 1913. Not believed to have ever received G&SWR livery or carried their G&SWR (or LMS) numbers.

=== R. H. Whitelegg (1918–1922) ===
See Robert Harben Whitelegg

Wheel Arrangement	Class	Date	Builder	No. built	G&SWR nos.	LMS power classification	LMS nos.	Withdrawn	Notes
4-4-0	485	1921	G&SWR Kilmarnock	1	485	2P	14270	1933	Same as rebuilds of Manson's "8" class
4-6-4T	540	1922	North British	6	540–545	5P	15400–5	1935–36	
0-4-0ST	735	1904	Peckett	1	735	U	16043	1930	Acquired secondhand from Ayr Harbour in 1919
0-6-2T	1	1919	North British	10	1–10	3F	16400–9 (later 16900–9)	1936–48	Similar to Drummond "45" class.
0-6-0	150	1921	G&SWR Kilmarnock	2	150-1	3F	17523–4	1931–35	Same as rebuilds of Manson's "361" class

== Numbering and classification ==
The very first engines of the GPK&AR were named but soon after received numbers. As the GD&CR was always intended to merge with the former its engines were allocated numbers following on from the GPK&AR sequence.

From 1851 new engines were given the numbers of older engines that had been withdrawn from service. Eventually new engines were being allocated the numbers of old engines that were intended for withdrawal but which were still running and so two engines would be running with the same number. In 1878 Hugh Smellie introduced an ‘R’ list to cater for older engines whose number had been allocated to a newer one. Later on Manson used an ‘A’ list system, where the older engine had an ‘A’ added to its number. By 1919 the system was so complicated that there was a complete renumbering of all engines.

Class numbers were the number of the first engine built in the class. Given the policy on numbering this meant that classes with lower numbers could frequently be newer than higher numbered classes.

See also LMS locomotive numbering and classification

== Liveries ==
Various shades of green provided the basic colour of the locomotives, with lining in black and white or black and yellow.

== Locomotives under LMS ownership ==
The G&SWR locomotive stock fell foul of the London, Midland and Scottish Railway policy of standardisation following the grouping. Within ten years nearly 80% had been withdrawn from service and only a single 1 Class 0-6-2T engine remained by nationalisation in 1948.

== Preservation ==
Image	GSWR No.	GSWR Class	Type	Manufacturer	Serial No.	Date	Notes
	9	5 Class	0-6-0T	North British Locomotive Company	21521	November; 1917	Sold by the LMS in 1934 to a colliery in Denbighshire, and subsequently passing into National Coal Board ownership, it was from that location that it was acquired for preservation. It is now on display in the Riverside Museum.

== Sources ==
- Highet, Campbell (1965) The Glasgow & South-Western Railway, Lingfield: Oakwood Press
- Smith, David Larmer (1976). Locomotives of the Glasgow and South Western Railway. Newton Abbot; North Pomfret, Vt. [etc.]: David and Charles. ISBN 0-7153-6960-1.
- Williams, Peter (1974). Britain's Railway Museums. Shepperton: Ian Allan Ltd. 0 7110 0565 6.
- Baxter, Bertram (1984). Baxter, David (ed.). British Locomotive Catalogue 1825–1923. Vol. 4: Scottish and remaining English Companies in the LMS Group. Ashbourne, Derbyshire: Moorland Publishing Company.
