= G&SWR 40 Class =

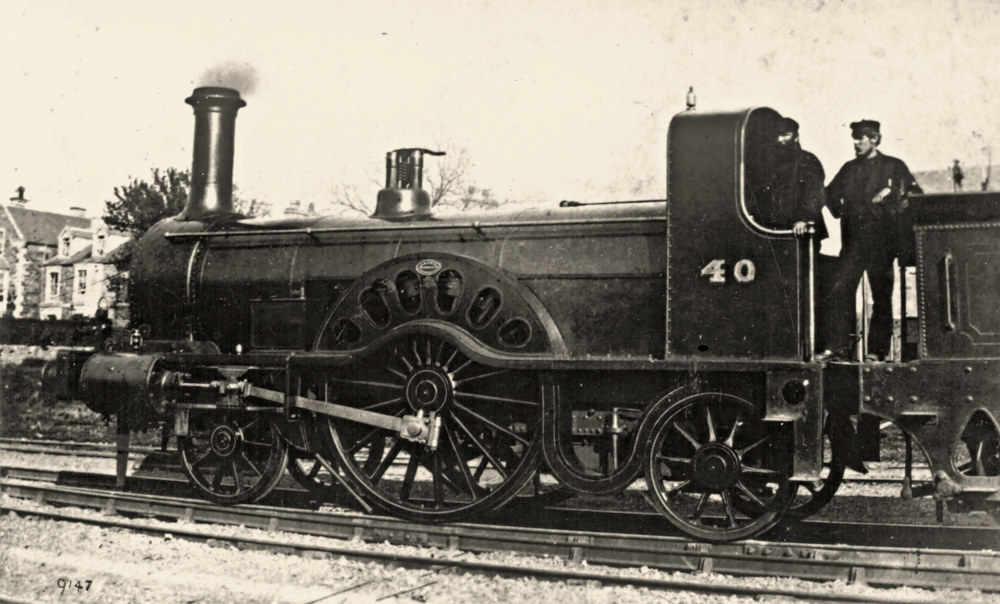
- G&SWR 40 single driver locomotive
Type and origin
- Power type: Steam
- Designer: Patrick Stirling
- Builder: Kilmarnock Locomotive Works
- Build date: 1860–1864
- Total produced: 10
Specifications
- Configuration
  - Whyte: 2-2-2
- Gauge: 4 ft 8 1/2 in (1,435 mm)
- Leading dia.: 3 ft 6 in (1.07 m)
- Driver dia.: 6 ft 6 in (1.98 m)
- Trailing dia.: 3 ft 6 in (1.07 m)
- Loco weight: 24.25 LT (24.64 t)
- Fuel type: Coal
- Cylinders: two, outside
- Cylinder size: 16 in × 21 in (410 mm × 530 mm)
Career
- Withdrawn: 1876–1881
- Disposition: All scrapped

The Glasgow and South Western Railway (GSWR) 40 class was a class of ten 2-2-2 steam locomotives designed in 1860, a development of the 2 class intended for express passenger duties.

== Development ==
This was the second class to be built at the new Kilmarnock Locomotive Works, in two batches. The first six locomotives numbered 40, 39, 27, 10, 43 and 42 (Works Nos. 14–19) were built between 1860 and January 1862. A further four locomotives, numbered 28–9, 31 and 44 were built in 1864 (Works Nos. 26–29). The members of the class were fitted with domeless boilers. They were originally built without cabs, but several later had them fitted. Two members of the class were fitted with Giffard injectors.

== Withdrawal ==
The class were withdrawn by James Stirling and Hugh Smellie between 1876 and 1881.
