= G&SWR 45 Class 2-2-2 =

G&SWR 45 Class
Type and origin
- Power type: Steam
- Designer: Patrick Stirling
- Builder: Kilmarnock Locomotive Works
- Build date: 1865-1868
- Total produced: 11
Specifications
- Configuration
  - Whyte: 2-2-2
- Gauge: 4 ft 8 1/2 in (1,435 mm)
- Leading dia.: 3 ft 7 in (1.09 m)
- Driver dia.: 7 ft 0 in (2.13 m)
- Trailing dia.: 3 ft 7 in (1.09 m)
- Loco weight: 28 LT 9.75 cwt (63,812 lb; 28.945 t)
- Fuel type: Coal
- Boiler pressure: 125 psi (860 kPa)
- Cylinders: two, outside
- Cylinder size: 16 in × 24 in (410 mm × 610 mm)
Career
- Withdrawn: 1884-1887
- Disposition: All scrapped

The Glasgow and South Western Railway (GSWR) 45 class was a class of eleven 2-2-2 steam locomotives designed in 1865, an enlarged version of his 40 class intended for express passenger duties.

== Development ==
Eleven examples of this final express passenger class designed by Patrick Stirling for the FSWR were built at Kilmarnock Locomotive Works at regular intervals between March 1865 and July 1868 (Works Nos. 32, 39-40, 43-4, 47-8, 50-53). They were numbered 45, 151-6, 84, 61, 16 & 79. The members of the class were fitted with domeless boilers and safety valves over the firebox. The safety valves were later replaced by those of Ramsbottom design over the centre of the boiler following a boiler explosion at Springhill in 1876. They were fitted with Stirling’s own design of cab and open fan-like splashers.

== Withdrawal ==
The class were withdrawn Hugh Smellie between 1884 and 1887.
