= G&SWR 95 Class =

Type and origin
- Power type: Steam
- Designer: Patrick Stirling
- Builder: Neilson and Company
- Build date: 1855
- Total produced: 4
Specifications
- Configuration
  - Whyte: 2-2-2
- Gauge: 4 ft 8 1/2 in (1,435 mm)
- Driver dia.: 6 ft 6 in (1.98 m)
- Fuel type: Coal
- Cylinders: two, outside
- Cylinder size: 15 in × 20 in (380 mm × 510 mm)
Career
- Withdrawn: 1874–1875
- Disposition: All scrapped

The Glasgow and South Western Railway (GSWR) 95 class was a class of four 2-2-2 steam locomotives designed in 1855.

== Development ==
Patrick Stirling was appointed locomotive superintendent of the GSWR in 1853 and this was his first design. They had domed boilers and column-type safety valves above the firebox. They were numbered 95–98.

== Withdrawal ==
The class was withdrawn by James Stirling during 1874–5.
