= G&SWR 11 Class =

G&SWR No 11
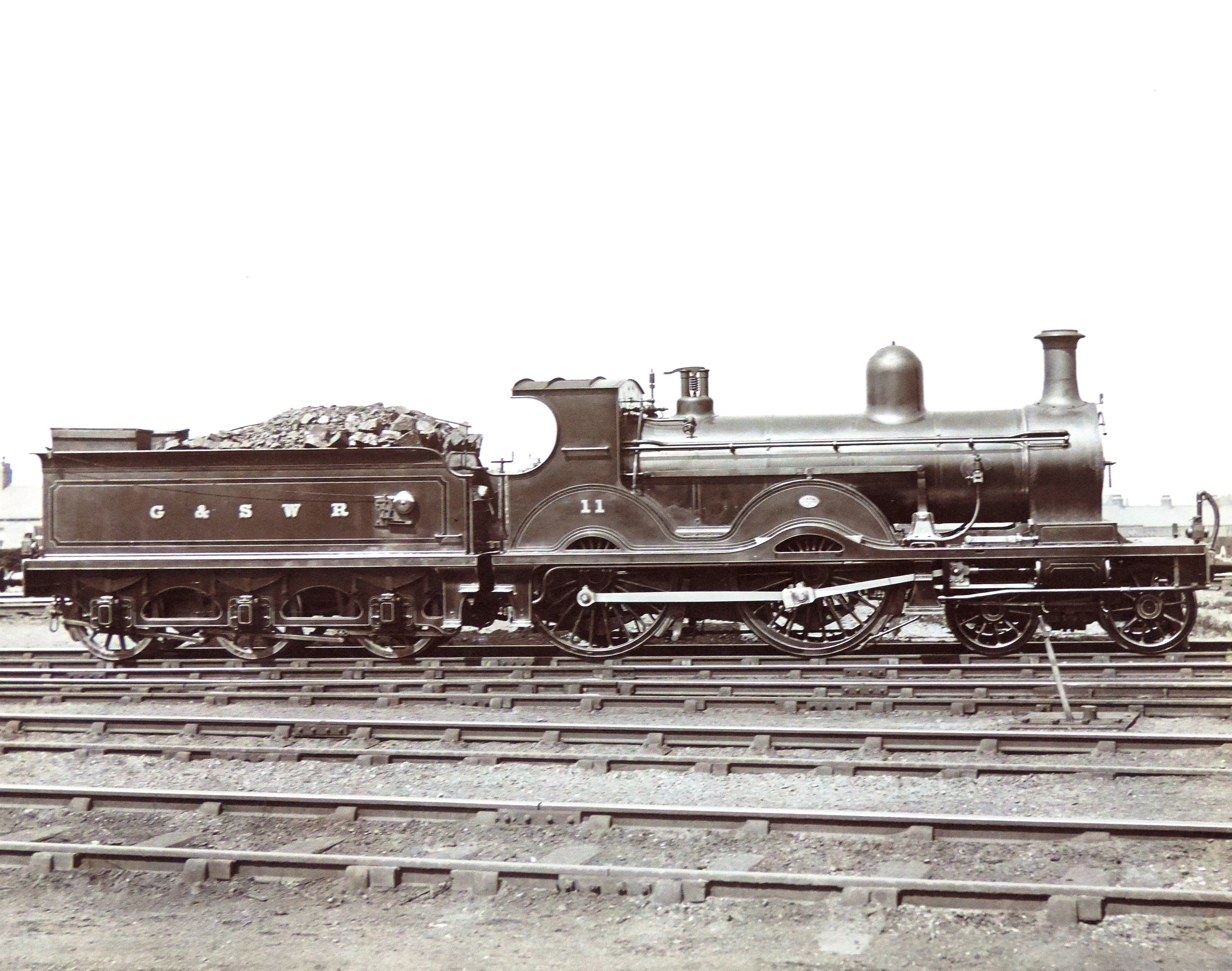
Type and origin
- Power type: Steam
- Designer: James Manson
- Builder: Kilmarnock Locomotive Works, Kilmarnock
- Build date: 1897
- Total produced: 1
Specifications
- Configuration
  - Whyte: 4-4-0
  - UIC: 2′B n4
- Gauge: 4 ft 8 1/2 in (1,435 mm)
- Leading dia.: 3 ft 7.5 in (1.105 m)
- Driver dia.: 6 ft 9.5 in (2.070 m)
- Wheelbase: 6 ft + 7 ft 2 in + 8 ft 9 in 1.8 m + 2.18 m + 2.67 m
- Adhesive weight: 17 long tons; 17,000 kg
- Loco weight: 48.7 long tons; 49,500 kg
- Fuel type: Coal
- Firebox
  - Grate area: 18 sq ft (1.7 m^{2})
- Boiler
  - Diameter: 4 ft 2 in (1.27 m) outside
  - Small tubes: 238× 1.675 in (42.5 mm)
- Boiler pressure: 165 psi (1,140 kPa)
- Heating surface
  - Firebox: 111 sq ft (10.3 m^{2})
  - Tubes: 1,094 sq ft (101.6 m^{2})
  - Total surface: 1,205 sq ft (111.9 m^{2})
- Cylinders: Four
- Cylinder size: Inside: 14 1/2 in × 26 in (368 mm × 660 mm); Outside: 12 1/2 in × 24 in (318 mm × 610 mm)
- Valve gear: Stephenson link
Performance figures
- Tractive effort: 15,860 lbf (70.5 kN)
Career
- Operators: G&SWR
- Power class: 3P (LMS)
- Number in class: 1
- Numbers: 11; 394
- Official name: Lord Glenarthur (after 1922)
- First run: 13 April 1897
- Disposition: Scrapped
- From unless noted

The G&SWR No 11 was one of the first four-cylinder steam locomotives in the UK. It was built to the design of James Manson at the G&SWR's Kilmarnock Works in 1897, as a development of his two-cylinder 'Manson Bogies' of 1892.

== Design ==
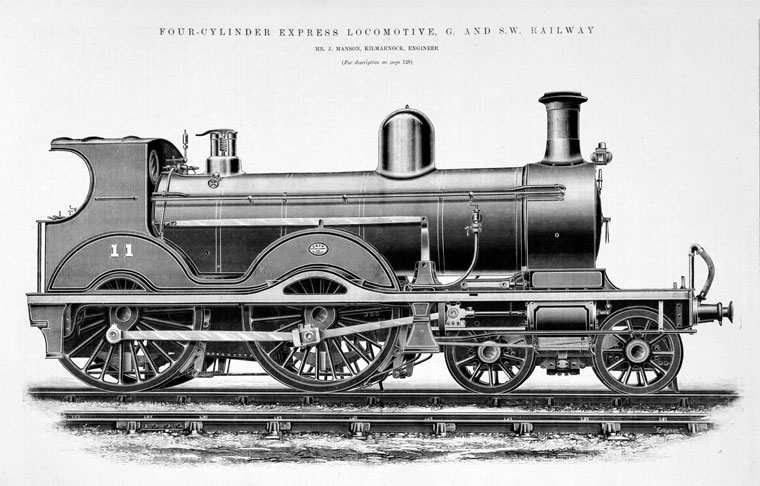
Plate in The Engineer, 1898

This was one of three designs of the first four-cylinder locomotives, produced near-simultaneously around 1897. The others were Webb's Black Prince or Jubilee class and Drummond's T7. As was the typical express passenger locomotive pattern of the day, all were of 4-4-0 arrangement. (Note: Although Drummond's T7 had a divided-drive arrangement, where pairs of cylinders drive each axle and there are no coupling rods between them, making it a 4-2-2-0. The T7 had a long firebox, placed between the driven axles, giving it an unusually long coupled wheelbase; there were concerns over the rigidity of coupling rods this long.)

The 4-4-0 had been in use for some time before this. The first example of a comparable UK design was the NBR 224 Class of 1871. Coincidentally, the first of that class was rebuilt in 1885, after its loss in the Tay Bridge disaster, to become the first four-cylinder locomotive, although as a tandem compound.

Manson's earlier 'Manson Bogies' were already in successful service. To improve their running at speed, he planned to make a four-cylinder version, which could be better balanced. Inside and outside cylinders ran at 180° to each other, with each side quartered at 90°, as conventional. He may also have been considering a four-cylinder compound, as for Webb. The two inside cylinders were narrowed from 18 1/4 to 14 1/2 in (460 to 370 mm) but kept their 26 in (660 mm) stroke. 12 1/2 in × 24 in (320 mm × 610 mm) external cylinders were added, unusual in that their stroke was shorter than the internal ones. This was due to the short bogie wheelbase leaving little room for the outside cylinders between the wheels. Although such a difference was unusual, it did not affect their balance. The overall cylinder volume of the four-cylinder locomotive was the same as the two-cylinder. (Note: 13,602 and 14,477 in^{3} (222,900 and 237,240 cm^{3}))

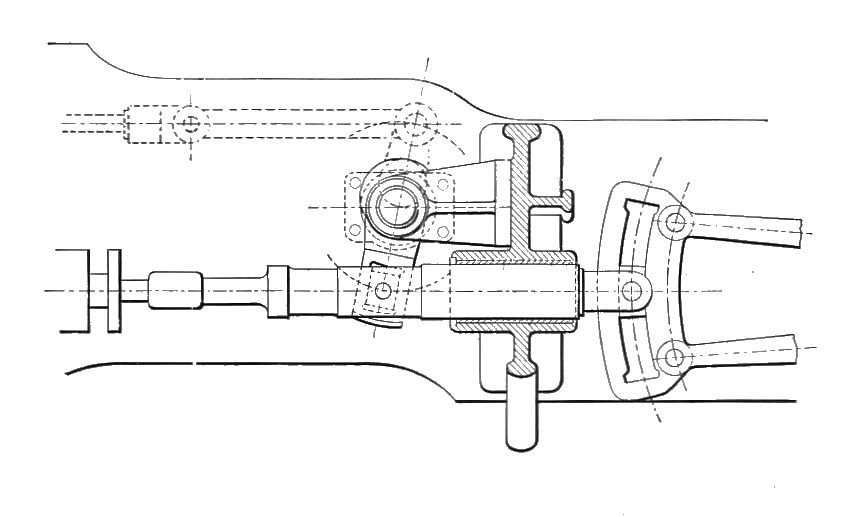
Valvegear rocking shaft

A single set of Stephenson valve gear was shared between inside and outside cylinders. The valves of the inside cylinders were driven directly, the outside valves were balanced valves mounted above their cylinders and driven through a transverse rocking shaft. Both used slide valves, the inside slide valves mounted between the cylinders, the outside valves placed on top above the footplate.

== Service ==
It entered service on 13 April 1897 and was worked extensively on express trains between Carlisle and Glasgow, travelling 24,575 mi (39,550 km) in its first year.

== 1922 rebuild ==
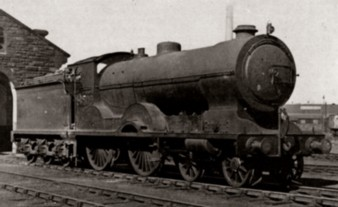
As rebuilt after 1922

Given the additional cylinders compared to the 8 class, and the size of their boilers, it was unsurprising that the locomotive had always run better than it steamed. R. H. Whitelegg had already rebuilt the Manson Bogies with a new boiler and simplification to their valve gear, but this boiler was only a little bigger, although simpler to construct, and the need to 'force' the boilers in service increased coal consumption.

In 1922, Whitelegg rebuilt 11 with a larger boiler, the number 394 and the name Lord Glenarthur, after Sir Matthew Arthur, 1st Baron Glenarthur (1852–1928), then chairman of the G&SWR.

The motion was only slightly changed, with all four cylinders rebuilt to the same 14 in (360 mm) diameter while retaining their same space-constrained differences in stroke. Whitelegg's new boiler also added a small superheater, enlarged the firebox and grate areas, and raised the boiler pressure to 180 psi (1,200 kPa).
