= G&SWR 58 Class =

Type and origin
- Power type: Steam
- Designer: Patrick Stirling
- Builder: Kilmarnock Locomotive Works 6 locomotives Neilson and Company 20 locomotives
- Build date: 1866-1869
- Total produced: 26
Specifications
- Configuration
  - Whyte: 0-6-0
- Gauge: 4 ft 8 1/2 in (1,435 mm)
- Driver dia.: 5 ft 1 in (1.55 m)
- Wheelbase: 7 ft 4 in (2.24 m) + 8 ft 2 in (2.49 m)
- Loco weight: 31 LT 9.25 cwt (70,476 lb; 31.967 t)
- Fuel type: Coal
- Water cap.: 1,500 imp gal (6,800 L; 1,800 US gal)
- Boiler pressure: 120 psi (0.83 MPa)
- Cylinders: two
- Cylinder size: 17 in × 24 in (430 mm × 610 mm)
Career
- Withdrawn: 1890-1922
- Disposition: All scrapped

The Glasgow and South Western Railway (GSWR) 58 class was a class of six 0-6-0 steam locomotives designed in 1862. They were Patrick Stirling’s third 0-6-0 design for the railway.

== Development ==
The original six examples of this class were designed by Patrick Stirling for the GSWR and were built by Kilmarnock Locomotive Works (Works Nos. between 37 and 46) in 1866 and 1867. They were numbered 58, 94 and 99-102. The members of the class were fitted with a Stirling cab and a Giffard injector, domeless boilers and safety valves over the firebox, which were later replaced by those of Ramsbottom design over the centre of the boiler following a boiler explosion at Springhill in 1876. Two further series of ten locomotives each were built by Neilson and Company in 1867 and 1869, (Works Nos. 1317-26, and 1443–52), numbered 160-169 and 172-181.

== Withdrawal ==
The locomotives were withdrawn between 1890 and 1922.
