= G&SWR 6 Class =

Type and origin
- Power type: Steam
- Designer: James Stirling (1835–1917)
- Builder: Kilmarnock Locomotive Works
- Build date: 1873-1877
- Total produced: 22
Specifications
- Configuration
  - Whyte: 4-4-0
- Gauge: 4 ft 8 1/2 in (1,435 mm)
- Leading dia.: 3 ft 7 in (1.09 m)
- Driver dia.: 7 ft 1 in (2.16 m)
- Wheelbase: 4 ft 10 in (1.47 m) + 7 ft 2.75 in (2.2035 m)
- Loco weight: 39 LT (40 t)
- Fuel type: Coal
- Water cap.: 1,800 imp gal (8,200 L; 2,200 US gal)
- Boiler pressure: 140 psi (0.97 MPa)
- Cylinders: two
- Cylinder size: 18 in × 26 in (460 mm × 660 mm)
Career
- Withdrawn: 1894-1901
- Disposition: 17 renewed as G&SWR 194 Class remainder scrapped

The Glasgow and South Western Railway (GSWR) 6 class were a class of twenty-two 4-4-0 steam locomotives built in 1873. They were designed by James Stirling to handle express passenger trains taken over from the Midland Railway at Carlisle between there and Glasgow on the newly opened Glasgow and Kilmarnock Joint Railway.

== Development ==
The twenty-two examples of this class were designed by James Stirling for the GSWR and built at Kilmarnock Locomotive Works (Works Nos. between 95 and 127) between 1873 and 1877. They were numbered irregularly, and not in chronological order between 3 and 115, to fill gaps in the sequence of running numbers. The members of the class were fitted with domeless boilers and a cut away cab. The first locomotive (No. 6) was fitted with a spring balance type safety valve, but the remainder had those of Ramsbottom design over the centre of the boiler.

No. 106 was exhibited at the Darlington Exhibition in 1875.

== Withdrawal ==
The bulk of the class, including all the rebuilds were 'renewed' (i.e. substantially rebuilt) as G&SWR 194 Class by James Manson between 1895 and 1900, but five were scrapped between 1894 and 1897.
