= G&SWR 45 Class =

G&SWR 45 Class may refer to:

- G&SWR 45 Class 0-6-2T
- G&SWR 45 Class 2-2-2
