= G&SWR 9 Class =

Type and origin
- Power type: Steam
- Designer: Patrick Stirling
- Builder: Neilson and Company
- Build date: 1857
- Total produced: 7
Specifications
- Configuration
  - Whyte: 0-4-2
- Gauge: 4 ft 8 1/2 in (1,435 mm)
- Driver dia.: 5 ft 0 in (1.52 m)
- Trailing dia.: 3 ft 6 in (1.07 m)
- Wheelbase: 7 ft 2.5 in (2.197 m) + 6 ft 5 in (1.96 m)
- Fuel type: Coal
- Cylinders: two, outside
- Cylinder size: 16 in × 22 in (410 mm × 560 mm)
Career
- Withdrawn: 1875-1876
- Disposition: All scrapped

The Glasgow and South Western Railway (GSWR) 9 class was a class of seven 0-4-2 steam locomotives designed in 1857, as an enlarged version of the 105 class.

== Development ==
The seven examples of this class were designed by Patrick Stirling for the GSWR and were built by Neilson and Company (Works Nos. 398-404) between November and December 1857. They were numbered 9, 14, 15, 17, 20, 30, and 33. The members of the class were fitted with domed boilers and safety valves over the firebox.

== Withdrawal ==
No 174 was withdrawn after an accident at Dalbeattie in 1874, and No.20 suffered a boiler explosion at Springhill, Glasgow in March 1876. The remainder were withdrawn by James Stirling between 1874 and 1876.
