= G&SWR 34 Class =

Steam locomotive class

Type and origin
- Power type: Steam
- Designer: Patrick Stirling
- Builder: R & W Hawthorn
- Build date: 1858-59
- Total produced: 10
Specifications
- Configuration
  - Whyte: 0-4-2
- Gauge: 4 ft 8 1/2 in (1,435 mm)
- Driver dia.: 5 ft 0 in (1.52 m)
- Trailing dia.: 3 ft 6 in (1.07 m)
- Wheelbase: 7 ft 2.5 in (2.197 m) + 6 ft 6 in (1.98 m)
- Loco weight: 26 LT 16 cwt (27.2 t)
- Fuel type: Coal
- Cylinders: two, outside
- Cylinder size: 16 in × 22 in (410 mm × 560 mm)
Career
- Withdrawn: 1874-1876
- Disposition: All scrapped

The Glasgow and South Western Railway (GSWR) 34 class was a class of ten 0-4-2 steam locomotives designed in 1858.

== Development ==
The ten examples of this class were designed by Patrick Stirling for the GSWR and were built by R & W Hawthorn (Works Nos. 1034-43) between July 1858 and January 1859. They were numbered 34, 36, 32, 25, 110–115. The members of the class were fitted with domeless boilers and safety valves over the firebox.

== Withdrawal ==
The locomotives were withdrawn by James Stirling between 1874 and 1876.
