= G&SWR 2 Class =

Type and origin
- Power type: Steam
- Designer: Patrick Stirling
- Builder: Kilmarnock Locomotive Works
- Build date: 1857-1860
- Total produced: 13
Specifications
- Configuration
  - Whyte: 2-2-2
- Gauge: 4 ft 8 1/2 in (1,435 mm)
- Leading dia.: 3 ft 6 in (1.07 m)
- Driver dia.: 6 ft 6 in (1.98 m)
- Trailing dia.: 3 ft 6 in (1.07 m)
- Fuel type: Coal
- Cylinders: two, outside
- Cylinder size: 16 in × 21 in (410 mm × 530 mm)
Career
- Withdrawn: 1874-1875
- Disposition: All scrapped

The Glasgow and South Western Railway (GSWR) 2 class was a class of thirteen 2-2-2 steam locomotives designed in 1857 by Patrick Stirling and intended for express passenger duties.

== Development ==
Patrick Stirling was appointed locomotive superintendent of the GSWR in 1853 and set about designing the new Kilmarnock Locomotive Works which was opened in 1856. This was his first class to be built at the works (Works Nos. 1–13). Most members of the class had domeless boilers but some may have had domed boilers and column type safety valves above the firebox.

== Withdrawal ==
The class were withdrawn by James Stirling between 1874 and 1880.
