= G&SWR 105 Class =

Type and origin
- Power type: Steam
- Designer: Patrick Stirling
- Builder: R & W Hawthorn
- Build date: 1856
- Total produced: 4
Specifications
- Configuration
  - Whyte: 0-4-2
- Gauge: 4 ft 8 1/2 in (1,435 mm)
- Driver dia.: 5 ft 0 in (1.52 m)
- Trailing dia.: 3 ft 6 in (1.07 m)
- Wheelbase: 6 ft 10.5 in (2.096 m) + 6 ft 2.5 in (1.892 m)
- Fuel type: Coal
- Cylinders: two, outside
- Cylinder size: 16 in × 22 in (410 mm × 560 mm)
Career
- Withdrawn: 1875-1876
- Disposition: All scrapped

The Glasgow and South Western Railway (GSWR) 105 class was a class of four 0-4-2 steam locomotives designed in 1856.

== Development ==
Four examples of this class were designed by Patrick Stirling for the GSWR and were built at R & W Hawthorn (Works Nos. 950-3) between January and May 1856. They were numbered 105–108. The members of the class were fitted with domed boilers and safety valves over the firebox.

Seven further examples were built in 1857 with a longer 7 ft 2.5 in (2.197 m) + 6 ft 5 in (1.96 m) wheelbase as the 9 class.

== Withdrawal ==
The 105 class were withdrawn by James Stirling between 1884 and 1887.
