= G&SWR 131 and 137 Class 4-4-0 =

Locomotive classes

Glasgow & South Western Railway 131 and 137 Classes
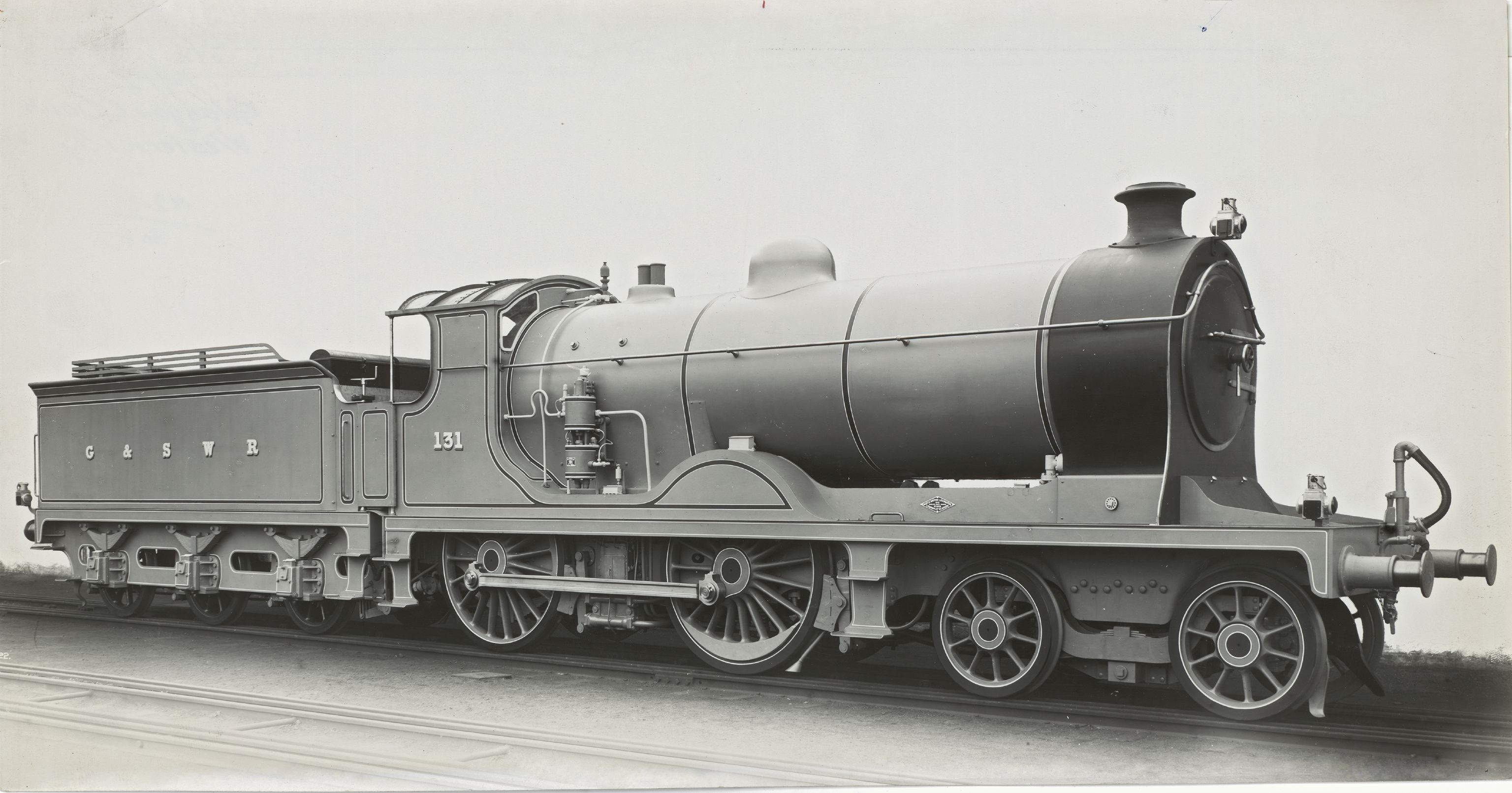
Type and origin
- Power type: Steam
- Designer: Peter Drummond
- Builder: 131: North British; 137: Kilmarnock
- Serial number: 131: NBL 20128–20133; 137: Kilmarnock 451–456
- Build date: 131: 1913; 137: 1914–1915
- Total produced: 131: 6; 137: 6
Specifications
- Configuration
  - Whyte: 4-4-0
  - UIC: 2′B
- Gauge: 4 ft 8 1/2 in (1,435 mm)
- Leading dia.: 3 ft 6 in (1.07 m)
- Driver dia.: 6 ft 0 in (1.83 m)
- Wheelbase: 6 ft 6 in (1.98 m) +; 8 ft 3 in (2.51 m) +; 10 ft 0 in (3.05 m) =; 24 ft 9 in (7.54 m)
- Loco weight: 131: 61 long tons 17 cwt (138,500 lb or 62.8 t); 137: see text
- Tender weight: 47 long tons 2 cwt (105,500 lb or 47.9 t)
- Water cap.: 3,800 imp gal (17,000 L; 4,600 US gal)
- Boiler pressure: 180 lbf/in^{2} (1.24 MPa)
- Superheater: 131: not fitted; 137: Schmidt
- Cylinders: Two, inside
- Cylinder size: 19 1/2 in × 26 in (495 mm × 660 mm)
- Valve gear: Walschaerts
- Valve type: Piston valves
Performance figures
- Tractive effort: 21,009 lbf (93.45 kN)
Career
- Operators: Glasgow and South Western Railway; → London, Midland and Scottish Railway
- Class: G&SWR: 131 and 137 classes (1913-1919), later 331 and 325 classes (1919-23)
- Power class: LMS: 3P
- Withdrawn: 1934-1937
- Disposition: All scrapped

The Glasgow and South Western Railway (G&SWR) 131 Class and 137 Class were two closely related classes of 4-4-0 steam locomotives designed by Peter Drummond. A total of 12 locomotives were built between 1913 and 1915, with some constructed by the North British Locomotive Company (NBL) at its Queens Park works and others by the G&SWR at its Kilmarnock works.

Originally designated as the 131 and 137 classes, the locomotives were later renumbered and became known as the 331 and 325 classes respectively in 1919. The classes were transferred to the London, Midland and Scottish Railway (LMS) in 1923, where they were given the 3P power classification.

== 131 Class ==
The appointment of Peter Drummond as locomotive superintendent of the G&SWR at the end of 1911 resulted in significant changes in the design of subsequent locomotives, as Drummond was an 'outsider' to the G&SWR with little affinity for the established Kilmarnock design principles and a preference for much larger locomotives than the railway was then operating. In many ways, Drummond's designs mirrored those of his elder brother Dugald on the London and South Western Railway, including a preference for big engines and the rejection of superheating in favour of smokebox steam driers. The first products of this approach on the G&SWR were the 279 Class 0-6-0 goods engines of 1913, followed by the six 4-4-0 passenger locomotives of the 131 Class.

The 131 Class shared many of the attributes of the 279s. Just as the 279 class were Britain's heaviest 0-6-0s at the time of their construction, the 131s were Britain's heaviest 4-4-0s at the time. They were delivered to Greenock (Princes Pier) and Ayr locomotive sheds for use on passenger services from the Clyde coast towns into Glasgow, but their performance was initially disappointing for such large engines and there were various reliability problems. They were generally lacking in speed and this was especially pronounced when climbing gradients, so by the end of 1916 all six locomotives were allocated to Ayr for use on the relatively level Ayr-Glasgow line.

As they were used on relatively lightweight passenger trains, the coal consumption was acceptable and the defective Crankpin design did not give as much trouble as on the 279 class; however, the overheating of the bogie axleboxes was a constant problem. It was suspected that the bogies were carrying an incorrect amount of weight, but identifying the problem was hindered by the fact that the locomotives were too heavy for the weighing machine at Kilmarnock works.

== 137 Class ==
The shortcomings of the 131 Class led to two major changes for the next batch of passenger locomotives. Although very similar to the 131s in most respects, the new 137s featured superheating and improved feed-water heating arrangements. These alterations would have added to the locomotives' weight, but no official weight was ever published for the 137 class in their original condition. It has been suggested that one locomotive was sent to the NBL to be weighed, but that the G&SWR suppressed the figure. Estimates based on the official weight of engine and tender combined and on later LMS official weights after modifications suggest that the locomotives would have weighed approximately 64 tons 1 cwt as built. Amongst British 4-4-0s only the later LNER D49 and SR Schools classes were heavier.

The modifications were successful and the 137s were a great improvement over the 131 class, being fast and very economical in coal and water. However the deficiencies of the axleboxes and crankpins had not been rectified, and this prevented the locomotives from being regularly employed on G&SWR's heaviest and most important express trains on the Glasgow to Carlisle line. They instead spent most of their lives on second-tier services, although their speed and hill-climbing abilities were useful on the steeply graded lines to Stranraer.

== LMS service ==
The success of the subsequent 137 class led the LMS to rebuild five of the 131 class with superheating between 1923 and 1931, leaving only No. 14511 with a saturated boiler, which it retained until withdrawal. Although all of the superheated engines were capable of economical performance the reliability problems were never fully overcome, and as a small group of only twelve locomotives they were deemed non-standard by the LMS. They were thus withdrawn and scrapped between 1934 and 1937, having outlasted all of the other G&SWR tender engines except the 403 Class moguls.

== Locomotive numbering and histories ==
Table of locomotives
G&SWR original no.	G&SWR 1919 number	LMS number	Delivered	Works number	Withdrawn	Class
131	331	14510	June 1913	NBL 20128	September 1936	131 Class
132	332	14511	June 1913	NBL 20129	October 1934	131 Class
133	333	14512	June 1913	NBL 20130	October 1934	131 Class
134	334	14513	June 1913	NBL 20131	December 1937	131 Class
135	335	14514	June 1913	NBL 20132	July 1936	131 Class
136	336	14515	June 1913	NBL 20133	June 1937	131 Class
137	325	14516	January 1915	Kilmarnock 451	September 1936	137 Class
138	326	14517	February 1915	Kilmarnock 452	May 1937	137 Class
139	327	14518	February 1915	Kilmarnock 453	December 1934	137 Class
140	328	14519	August 1915	Kilmarnock 454	November 1936	137 Class
151	329	14520	August 1915	Kilmarnock 455	November 1935	137 Class
152	330	14521	September 1915	Kilmarnock 456	August 1937	137 Class
