= G&SWR 52 Class =

Type and origin
- Power type: Steam
- Designer: Patrick Stirling
- Builder: Kilmarnock Locomotive Works
- Build date: 1864-6
- Total produced: 6
Specifications
- Configuration
  - Whyte: 0-4-0
- Gauge: 4 ft 8 1/2 in (1,435 mm)
- Driver dia.: 5 ft 0 in (1.52 m)
- Wheelbase: 8 ft 0 in (2.44 m)
- Loco weight: 26 LT 4 cwt (26.6 t)
- Fuel type: Coal
- Fuel capacity: 3 LT (3.0 t)
- Water cap.: 1,200 imp gal (5,500 L; 1,400 US gal)
- Cylinders: two
- Cylinder size: 16 in × 22 in (410 mm × 560 mm)
Career
- Withdrawn: All withdrawn by 1903
- Disposition: All scrapped

The Glasgow and South Western Railway (GSWR) 52 class was a class of six 0-4-0 steam goods locomotives designed in 1864, by Patrick Stirling. The design was later continued by a similar design by his brother James Stirling.

== Development ==
The six examples of this class were designed by Patrick Stirling for the GSWR and were built by Kilmarnock Locomotive Works between 1864 and 1866, to replace earlier 0-4-0 goods locomotives inherited by the railway. They were numbered 52-57-. The members of the class were fitted with weather boards, later replaced by Stirling cabs. The safety valves over the firebox were later replaced by those of Ramsbottom design over the centre of the boiler following a boiler explosion at Springhill in 1876. The class was later perpetuated by Stirling's brother James Stirling in his 65 class goods locomotives.

== Withdrawal ==
The locomotives were all withdrawn by 1903.
