= G&SWR 187 Class =

Type and origin
- Power type: Steam
- Designer: James Stirling
- Builder: Neilson and Company
- Build date: 1870-1871
- Total produced: 20
Specifications
- Configuration
  - Whyte: 0-4-2
- Gauge: 4 ft 8 1/2 in (1,435 mm)
- Driver dia.: 5 ft 7 in (1.70 m)
- Trailing dia.: 3 ft 7 in (1.092 m)
- Length: 50 ft 7 in (15.42 m)
- Loco weight: 29.5 long tons (30.0 t)
- Fuel type: Coal
- Boiler pressure: 130 psi (900 kPa)
- Cylinders: two, inside
- Cylinder size: 17 in × 24 in (430 mm × 610 mm)
Performance figures
- Tractive effort: 11,439 lbf (50.88 kN)
Career
- Withdrawn: ? 1897-1917
- Disposition: All scrapped

The Glasgow and South Western Railway (GSWR) 187 class were a class of 0-4-2 steam locomotives designed for mixed traffic duties, by James Stirling in 1870. They formed a model for large numbers of similar 0-4-2 mixed traffic locomotives subsequently built on GSWR and other British railways.

== Development ==
James Stirling’s predecessor at the GSWR had been his brother Patrick, who built five classes of 0-4-2 locomotive for freight duties between 1856 and 1866. After Patrick left to join the Great Northern Railway, James sought to develop a version capable of a wider range of duties. The class has been described by Casserley as ‘probably the first engines coming within the modern definition of ‘mixed traffic’ locomotives.’ Twenty examples of the class were built in 1870-72, but the design was further developed by Stirling with his 208 and 221 mixed traffic 0-4-2 classes, of which sixty were built between 1873 and 1878.

The use of the 0-4-2 wheel arrangement for mixed traffic locomotives was later followed by Patrick Stirling on the GNR and by William Adams on his Jubilee class for the London and South Western Railway 1887–1894.

== Withdrawal ==
Seven examples were renewed by Manson in 1900-1901 and these survived until 1926-30. The remainder with withdrawn between 1897 and 1917.
