= G&SWR 46 Class =

Type and origin
- Power type: Steam
- Designer: Patrick Stirling
- Builder: Kilmarnock Locomotive Works
- Build date: 1862-1863
- Total produced: 6
Specifications
- Configuration
  - Whyte: 0-6-0
- Gauge: 4 ft 8 1/2 in (1,435 mm)
- Driver dia.: 5 ft 0 in (1.52 m)
- Loco weight: 30 LT 6 cwt (30.8 t)
- Fuel type: Coal
- Boiler pressure: 125 psi (0.86 MPa)
- Cylinders: two
- Cylinder size: 16 in × 22 in (410 mm × 560 mm)
Career
- Withdrawn: 1888-1893
- Disposition: All scrapped

The Glasgow and South Western Railway (GSWR) 46 class was a class of six 0-6-0 steam locomotives designed in 1862. They were Patrick Stirling’s second 0-6-0 design for the railway.

== Development ==
The six examples of this class were designed by Patrick Stirling for the GSWR and were built by Kilmarnock Locomotive Works (Works Nos. R4-R9) in 1864. They were numbered 46–51. The members of the class were fitted with domeless boilers and safety valves over the firebox, and weatherboards rather than cabs.

== Withdrawal ==
The locomotives were withdrawn between 1888 and 1893.
