= G&SWR 131 Class =

Type and origin
- Power type: Steam
- Designer: Patrick Stirling
- Builder: R and W Hawthorn
- Build date: 1864
- Total produced: 10
Specifications
- Configuration
  - Whyte: 0-4-2
- Gauge: 4 ft 8 1/2 in (1,435 mm)
- Driver dia.: 5 ft 0 in (1.52 m)
- Trailing dia.: 3 ft 6 in (1.07 m)
- Wheelbase: 7 ft 2 in (2.18 m) + 7 ft 1 in (2.16 m)
- Fuel type: Coal
- Boiler pressure: 120 psi (0.83 MPa)
- Cylinders: two
- Cylinder size: 16 in × 22 in (410 mm × 560 mm)
Career
- Withdrawn: 1883-1895
- Disposition: All scrapped

The Glasgow and South Western Railway (GSWR) 131 class was a class of ten 0-4-2 steam locomotives designed in 1864. They were by Patrick Stirling's fifth 0-4-2 design for the railway.

== Development ==
The ten examples of this class were designed by Patrick Stirling for the GSWR and were built by R and W Hawthorn (Works Nos. 1222–31) in 1864. They were numbered 131–40. The members of the class were fitted with domeless boilers and safety valves over the firebox, these were later replaced by those of Ramsbottom design over the centre of the boiler following a boiler explosion at Springhill in 1876. The original weather boards were also replaced by Stirling cabs.

Eight of the class were rebuilt as 0-4-2 tank locomotives between 1880 and 1886.

== Withdrawal ==
The locomotives were withdrawn between 1883 and 1895.
