= G&SWR 103 Class =

Type and origin
- Power type: Steam
- Designer: Patrick Stirling
- Builder: R & W Hawthorn
- Build date: 1855
- Total produced: 2
Specifications
- Configuration
  - Whyte: 0-6-0
- Gauge: 4 ft 8 1/2 in (1,435 mm)
- Driver dia.: 4 ft 6 in (1.37 m)
- Wheelbase: 6 ft 2 in (1.88 m) + 6 ft 2 in (1.88 m)
- Fuel type: Coal
- Water cap.: 1,150 imp gal (5,200 L; 1,380 US gal)
- Cylinders: two
- Cylinder size: 16 in × 21 in (410 mm × 530 mm)
Career
- Withdrawn: 1871
- Disposition: All scrapped

The Glasgow and South Western Railway (GSWR) 103 class was a class of two 0-6-0 steam locomotives designed in 1855. They were Patrick Stirling's first 0-6-0 design for the railway.

== Development ==
The two examples of this class were designed by Patrick Stirling for the GSWR and were built by R & W Hawthorn (Works Nos. 933–4) in 1855. They were numbered 103 and 104. The members of the class were fitted with a domed boilers and safety valves over the firebox.

== Withdrawal ==
The locomotives were withdrawn in 1871.
