= 46 class =

46 class or Class 46 may refer to:

- British Rail Class 46
- G&SWR 46 Class
- LSWR 46 class
- New South Wales 46 class locomotive
- PKP class SU46
