= G&SWR 8 Class 2-4-0 =

G&SWR 8 class
Type and origin
- Power type: Steam
- Designer: James Stirling (1835–1917)
- Builder: Kilmarnock Locomotive Works
- Build date: 1868–1870
- Total produced: 15
Specifications
- Configuration
  - Whyte: 2-4-0
- Gauge: 4 ft 8 1/2 in (1,435 mm)
- Leading dia.: 3 ft 7 in (1.09 m)
- Driver dia.: 4 ft 6 in (1.37 m)
- Wheelbase: 7 ft 4 in (2.24 m) + 8 ft 2 in (2.49 m)
- Loco weight: 31 long tons 4.25 cwt (69,900 lb or 31.7 t)
- Fuel type: Coal
- Boiler pressure: 130 psi (896 kPa)
- Cylinders: Two
- Cylinder size: 17 in × 24 in (430 mm × 610 mm)
Career
- Operators: Glasgow and South Western Railway
- Class: 8
- Withdrawn: 1900–1917
- Disposition: All scrapped

The Glasgow and South Western Railway (GSWR) 8 class were a class of sixteen 2-4-0 steam locomotives built between 1868 and 1870.

The sixteen examples of this class were designed by James Stirling for the GSWR and were built at Kilmarnock Locomotive Works (Works Nos. 49 and 54-67) between 1868 and 1870. They were numbered irregularly, and not in chronological order between 8 and 183, to fill gaps in the sequence of running numbers. The members of the class were fitted with domeless boilers and a cut away cab. They were fitted with spring balance type safety valves, but this was replaced by those of the Ramsbottom design over the centre of the boiler.

== Withdrawal ==
The bulk of the class, including all the rebuilds were scrapped between 1900 and 1905 but two survived until 1913 and 1917 respectively.
