= G&SWR 141 Class =

Type and origin
- Power type: Steam
- Designer: Patrick Stirling
- Builder: Neilson and Company
- Build date: 1866
- Total produced: 10
Specifications
- Configuration
  - Whyte: 0-4-2
- Gauge: 4 ft 8 1/2 in (1,435 mm)
- Driver dia.: 5 ft 1 in (1.55 m)
- Trailing dia.: 3 ft 7 in (1.09 m)
- Wheelbase: 7 ft 4 in (2.24 m) + 8 ft 2 in (2.49 m)
- Loco weight: 29 LT 10.5 cwt (66,140 lb; 30.00 t)
- Fuel type: Coal
- Fuel capacity: 3 LT (3.0 t)
- Water cap.: 1,500 imp gal (6,800 L; 1,800 US gal)
- Boiler pressure: 120 psi (0.83 MPa)
- Cylinders: two
- Cylinder size: 17 in × 24 in (430 mm × 610 mm)
Career
- Withdrawn: 1900-1924
- Disposition: All scrapped

The Glasgow and South Western Railway (GSWR) 141 class was a class of ten 0-4-2 steam locomotives designed in 1866. They were by Patrick Stirling's sixth 0-4-2 design for the railway.

== Development ==
The ten examples of this class were designed by Patrick Stirling for the GSWR and were built by Neilson and Company (Works Nos. 1226-35) in 1866. They were numbered 141–50. The members of the class were fitted with domeless boilers and safety valves over the firebox, these were later replaced by those of Ramsbottom design over the centre of the boiler following a boiler explosion at Springhill in 1876. The original weather boards were also replaced by Stirling cabs.

Four of the class were rebuilt as 0-4-2 tank locomotives between 1880 and 1886.

== Withdrawal ==
The bulk of the class, including all the rebuilds were withdrawn between 1900 and 1913. However, two examples survived into London Midland and Scottish Railway ownership and were withdrawn in 1923 and 1924 respectively.
