= Class 23 =

Class 23 may refer to:

- 23-class airship
- Belgian Railways Class 23, electric locomotive
- British Rail Class 23 "Baby Deltic", diesel-electric locomotive built by English Electric with Napier Deltic engines
- G&SWR 23 Class, 0-4-2 steam locomotive
- GNR Class J23, 0-6-0T steam locomotive
- L&YR Class 23, 0-6-0 steam locomotive operated by the Lancashire and Yorkshire Railway
- German express train, tender locomotives with a 2-6-2 wheel arrangement operated by the DRG, DB and DR:
  - The DRG's pre-war, standard, steam locomotive (Einheitslokomotive): DRG Class 23
  - The DB's post-war (Neubaulokomotive): DB Class 23
  - The DR's post-war Neubaulokomotive in East Germany: DR Class 23.10
- R23X-class airship
- Soviet locomotive class OR23
- Südbahn Class 23 (old)

== See also ==
- Type 23 (disambiguation)
