= G&SWR 23 Class =

Type and origin
- Power type: Steam
- Designer: Patrick Stirling
- Builder: Sharp, Stewart and Company
- Build date: 1860-2
- Total produced: 20
Specifications
- Configuration
  - Whyte: 0-4-2
- Gauge: 4 ft 8 1/2 in (1,435 mm)
- Driver dia.: 5 ft 0 in (1.52 m)
- Trailing dia.: 3 ft 6 in (1.07 m)
- Wheelbase: 7 ft 2 in (2.18 m) + 8 ft 10 in (2.69 m)
- Loco weight: 27 long tons 2 cwt (27.5 t)
- Fuel type: Coal
- Boiler pressure: 120 psi (0.83 MPa)
- Cylinders: two
- Cylinder size: 16 in × 22 in (410 mm × 560 mm)
Career
- Withdrawn: 1882-1904
- Disposition: All scrapped

The Glasgow and South Western Railway (GSWR) 23 class is a class of twenty 0-4-2 steam locomotives designed in 1860. They were by Patrick Stirling's fourth 0-4-2 design for the railway.

== Development ==
The twenty examples of this class were designed by Patrick Stirling for the GSWR and were built by Sharp, Stewart and Company (Works Nos. 1196-1205, 1264–73 and 1359–60) between July 1860 and October 1862. They were numbered 23, 35, 37, 116-122, 22, 24, and 123-30. The members of the class were fitted with domeless boilers and safety valves over the firebox, these were later replaced by those of Ramsbottom design over the centre of the boiler following a boiler explosion at Springhill in 1876. The original weather boards were also replaced by Stirling cabs. Eight of the class were rebuilt as 0-4-2T locomotives between 1880 and 1886.

== Withdrawal ==
The unrebuilt locomotives were withdrawn by Hugh Smellie between 1882 and 1888. The rebuilt locomotives were withdrawn between 1890 and 1904.
