= Class 99 =

Class 99 may refer to:

- British Rail Class 99 (ships), train ferries operated by Sealink which were allocated British Rail TOPS numbers
- British Rail Class 99, a class of bi-mode freight locomotives ordered in 2022
- Class of '99, American band
- Class 99 (German narrow gauge locomotives), multiple types of German narrow gauge steam locomotives
- G&SWR 99 Class
