= Type 23 =

Type 23 may refer to:

- Bristol Type 23 Badger, a British fighter aircraft
- Nieuport Type 23, a French fighter aircraft
- Norinco Type 23-1 and Type 23-2, the Chinese versions of the Soviet autocannon Nudelman-Rikhter NR-23
- Peugeot Type 23, motor vehicle by the French auto-maker Peugeot
- Type 23 frigate, a Royal Navy frigate class
- Type 23 pillbox, a British WW II defence structure
- Type 23 torpedo boat, a class of torpedo boat built for the German Navy
- Type 23 air-to-ship missile, Japanese air-launched anti-ship missile, a variant of the Type 12 anti-ship missile.
- Type 23 ship-to-air missile, Japanese ship-to-air missile, a naval variant of the Type 03 surface to air missile.

== See also ==
- Class 23 (disambiguation)
