= George Tosh =

Scottish engineer and metallurgist

- Born: 1813
- Died: 1900 (aged 86–87); Scunthorpe, Lincolnshire, England
- Engineering career
- Discipline: Mechanical engineering

George Tosh (1813–1900) was a Scottish engineer and metallurgist who pioneered the use of steel in certain aspects of steam locomotive design.

== Career ==
His earlier career is not known (his obituaries speak of an early association with the Stephensons and the Stockton and Darlington Railway), but from children's birthplaces in census returns he was apparently resident in Newcastle by 1839, in Parton, Cumberland, during 1843–1848, and in Maryport by 1851. He became Locomotive Superintendent of the Maryport and Carlisle Railway (M&CR), in 1850 on the termination of the lease of the M&CR by the York, Newcastle and Berwick Railway and continued to serve in that capacity until 1870, becoming also Engineer to the Cockermouth and Workington Railway during its existence as an independent company. On leaving the Maryport & Carlisle Railway in 1870, he became the manager of the North Lincolnshire Iron Works.

== Innovations ==
During his tenure at the Maryport & Carlisle Railway, Tosh was the first to use steel for construction of a locomotive boiler (in 1862), where previously wrought iron had been the material of choice. The boiler/firebox was constructed by an outside contractor. It was not the first such design in the world – that accolade belonging to a Canadian locomotive, two years earlier – but it was certainly a first in Britain, and pre-empted the London & North Western Railway's developments of the technology.

Tosh was also amongst the first railway engineers in the country to introduce coal-burning (rather than coke) fireboxes (ten of the M&CR's locomotives had been converted to burn coal by February 1859) and fitted the first steel-tyred wheels to British locomotives. Most of his engines had domeless boilers. Nineteen locomotives of various wheel arrangements were provided during his superintendency.

== Family ==
He was married and had at least seven children; at least one of whom, Edmund George, after practising as an analytical chemist, followed his father's footsteps into the iron business.

== Death ==
George Tosh died in 1900, in Scunthorpe, Lincolnshire. His wife, Isabella, had died in 1868.

Business positions
Preceded by George Scott (to 1848)	Locomotive Superintendent of the Maryport and Carlisle Railway; 1850–1870	Succeeded by Hugh Smellie
