= G&SWR 279 Class =

Class of British steam locomotives

Glasgow and South Western Railway 279 Class
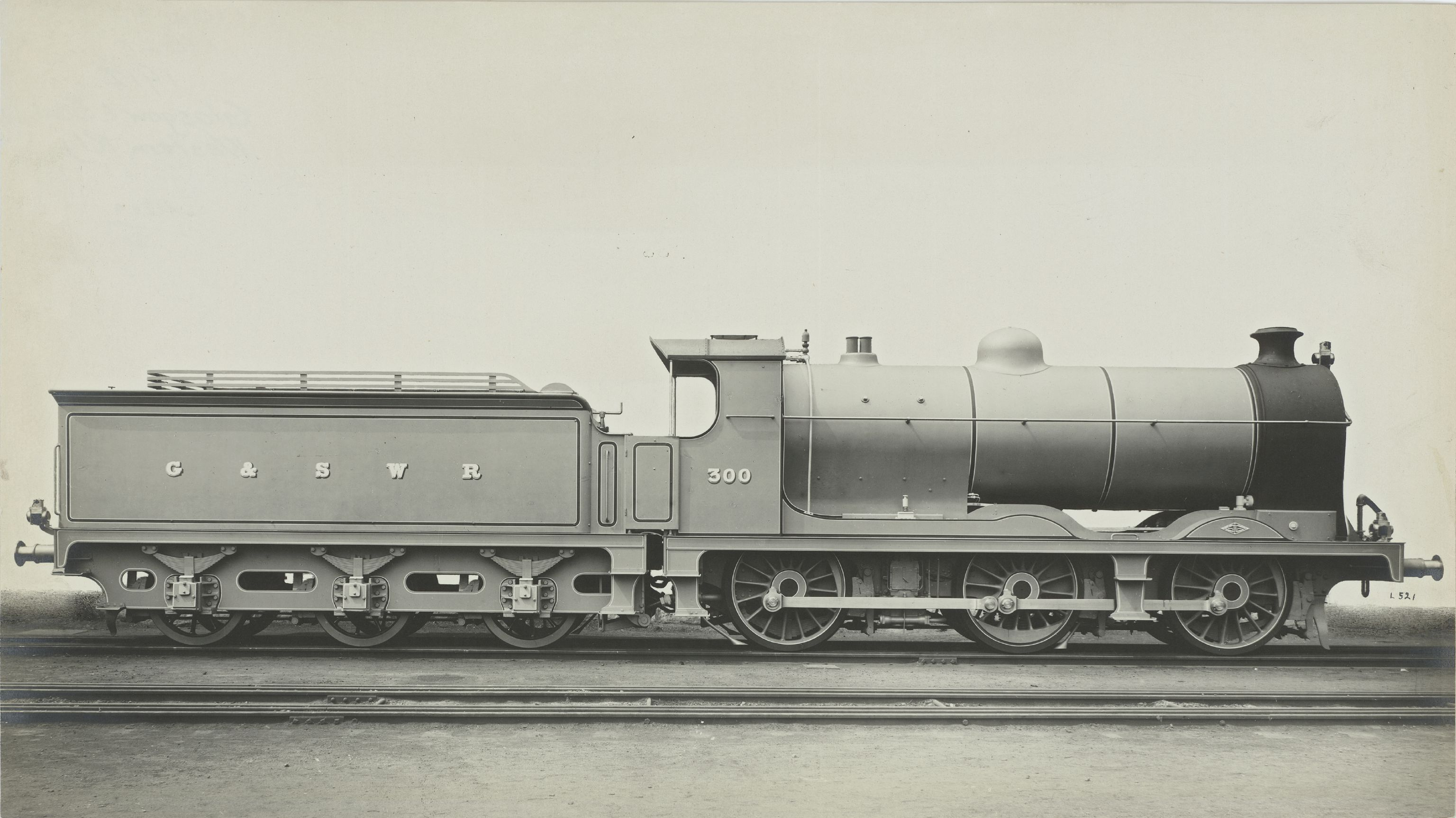
Type and origin
- Power type: Steam
- Designer: Peter Drummond
- Builder: North British Locomotive Co., Queen's Park Works, Glasgow
- Serial number: 20113-20127
- Build date: 1913
- Total produced: 15
Specifications
- Configuration
  - Whyte: 0-6-0
  - UIC: C
- Gauge: 4 ft 8 1/2 in (1,435 mm) standard gauge
- Driver dia.: 5 ft 0 in (1,524 mm)
- Wheelbase: 8 ft 1 in (2.46 m) +; 9 ft 0 in (2.74 m) =; 17 ft 1 in (5.21 m)
- Length: 54 ft 11 in (16.74 m)
- Loco weight: 57 long tons 15 cwt (129,400 lb or 58.7 t)
- Fuel type: Coal
- Water cap.: 3,800 imp gal (17,000 L; 4,600 US gal)
- Boiler
  - Diameter: 5 ft 4 1/2 in (1.638 m) maximum
- Boiler pressure: 180 psi (1.24 MPa)
- Heating surface: 1,874 sq ft (174.1 m^{2})
- Superheater: Smokebos steam drier
- Cylinders: Two
- Cylinder size: 19 1/2 in × 26 in (495 mm × 660 mm)
- Valve gear: Stephenson
- Valve type: Piston valves
Performance figures
- Tractive effort: 25,210 lbf (112.14 kN)
Career
- Operators: Glasgow and South Western Railway; London Midland and Scottish Railway
- Class: G&SWR 279, 71
- Power class: LMS: 4F
- Numbers: G&SWR (new): 279, 292–305; G&SWR (1919): 71–85; LMS: 17750–17764
- Retired: 1930–1933
- Disposition: All scrapped

The Glasgow and South Western Railway (G&SWR) 279 class was a class of 0-6-0 steam locomotive designed by Peter Drummond, of which 15 were built in 1913 by the North British Locomotive Company at its Queen's Park works. Originally built as the 279 class, as a result of renumbering they became known as the 71 class in 1919, before passing to the London, Midland and Scottish Railway (LMS) on its formation in 1923, where they were given power classification 4F.

== History ==
Until the retirement of James Manson from the post of locomotive superintendent at the end of 1911, the development of Glasgow and South Western Railway locomotives had been a matter of gradual evolution. Successive locomotive superintendents had learned their trade at the company's Kilmarnock Locomotive Works before reaching the top job. Most of the locomotives were efficient and reliable machines, but by 1911 many were elderly and even the newer locomotives were somewhat small by contemporary standards. The appointment of Peter Drummond to replace Manson marked a departure from previous practice, as Drummond was an 'outsider' to the G&SWR with little affinity for the established Kilmarnock design principles and a preference for larger locomotives.

The 279 class 0-6-0s were Drummond's first design for the G&SWR, and in keeping with his 'big engine' policy they were the heaviest 0-6-0s in Britain at the time of construction (their weight only being exceeded by the later LNER J38 and J39 classes). Despite their size they were not equipped with superheating as Peter Drummond (like his brother Dugald on the London and South Western Railway) instead preferred to use smokebox 'steam driers'. The locomotives had very little in common with previous G&SWR designs, even to the extent that they were driven from the left side of the cab – a change which was inevitably unpopular with enginemen who were used to driving from the right.

The new locomotives were delivered to Corkerhill and Currock locomotive sheds for use on goods traffic between Glasgow and Carlisle, but problems soon became apparent. Whilst they steamed well and were capable of hauling the 50 wagon trains they were designed for, the locomotives were extremely slow on the uphill sections of the line, had high coal and lubricating oil consumption, and were prone to overheating bearings. The marine pattern big ends were particularly prone to failure. Their performance and reliability was so poor that the company agreed to pay drivers and firemen a bonus of sixpence per single trip with a 279, provided they managed to complete at least three-quarters of the distance between Glasgow and Carlisle without it suffering a failure.

For the G&SWR's next batch of goods engines Drummond designed the 403 class, which was a superheated development of the 279 class with a leading pony truck. Eventually various modifications were carried out to improve the 279 class, including removal of the steam driers and the fitting of new cottered big ends. Reliability was greatly improved, but the very slow climbing speed was unchanged.

Under LMS ownership the Carlisle-based locomotives were transferred from Currock to the former Caledonian Railway shed at Carlisle Kingmoor, and they began to be used on a wider range of routes. From 1925 the availability of former Caledonian and new LMS Fowler Class 4F 0-6-0s enabled the class to be cascaded to less demanding duties and some engines were transferred to Ayr and Ardrossan sheds. As a class of only 15 locomotives they inevitably fell foul of the LMS standardisation policy, so they were withdrawn and scrapped between 1930 and 1933 when their boilers became due for replacement.

Table of withdrawals
Year	Number in service at start of year	Number withdrawn	Locomotive numbers
1930	15	6	17751/55/57/60/61/64
1931	9	5	17750/52/54/62/63
1932	4	2	17753/56
1933	2	2	17758/59

== Accidents and incidents ==
On 2 July 1928 locomotive 17759 was working a freight train from Stranraer to Glasgow which derailed whilst passing over a 15-mile-per-hour (24 km/h) curve at Pinwherry at around 50 mph (80 km/h), killing the driver and fireman. The reason for the excessive speed could not be conclusively established, but the driver had only recently been promoted to work over the Stranraer line and the accident inspector speculated that he may have forgotten about the tight curve at Pinwherry. If so, the driver may have intentionally built up speed on the downhill run from Chirmorlie to Pinwherry in order to make a good run up the ensuing climb to Pinmore.

== Numbering ==
- NBL works numbers: 20113-20127
- G&SWR 1913 numbers: 279, 292-305
- G&SWR 1919 numbers: 71-85
- LMS 1923 numbers: 17750-17764
