= 0-2-2-0 =

Locomotive wheel arrangement

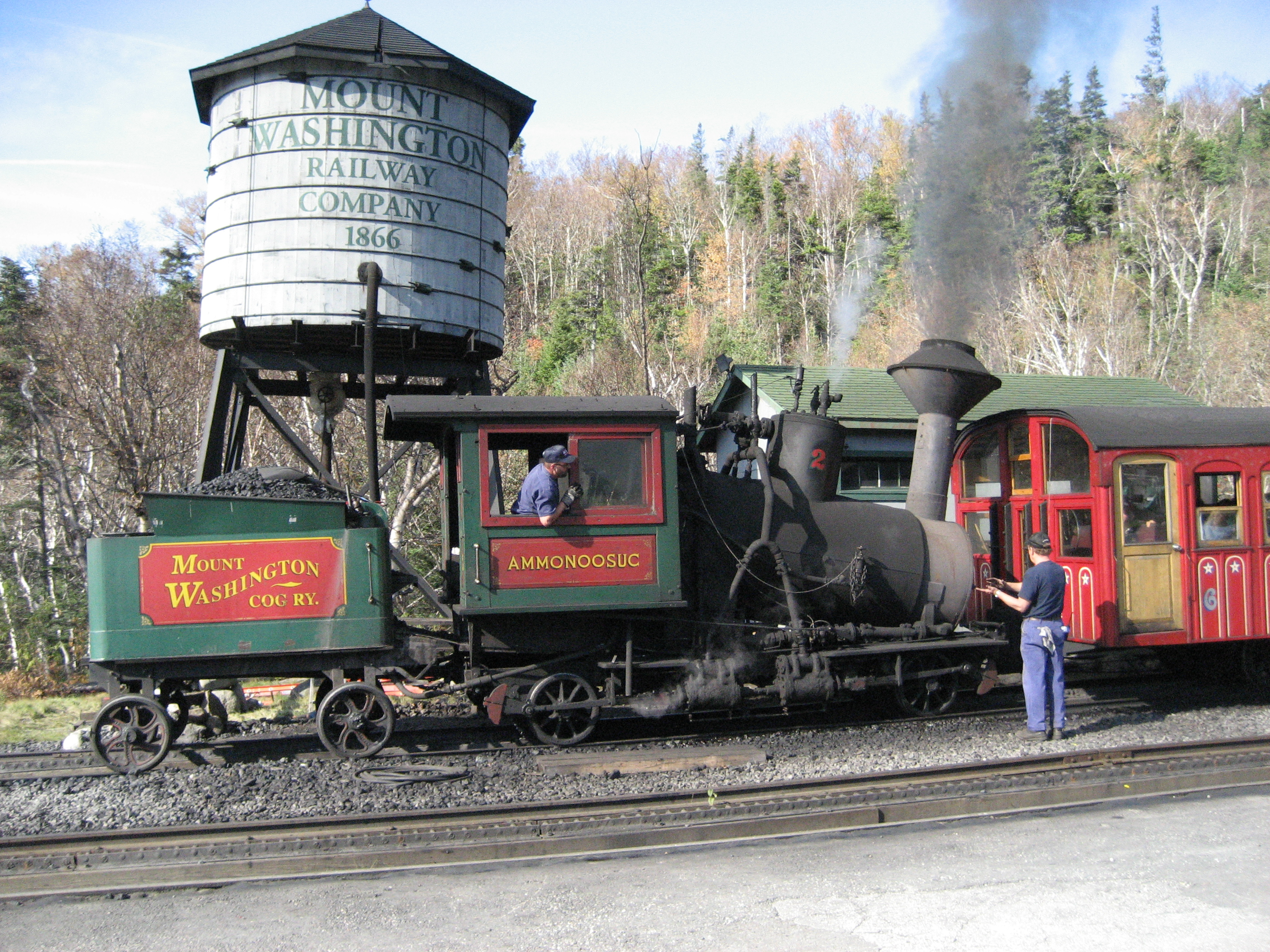
Mount Washington Cog Railway locomotive Ammonoosuc

Under the Whyte notation for the classification of steam locomotives, 0-2-2-0 represents the wheel arrangement of no leading wheels, four powered but uncoupled driving wheels on two axles, and no trailing wheels. Some authorities place brackets around the duplicated but uncoupled wheels, creating a notation 0-(2-2)-0.

== Usage ==
The first recorded use of the arrangement was in a well tank locomotive built by E. B. Wilson and Co. in 1850 for the York and North Midland Railway. It was taken over by the North Eastern Railway in 1854, and rebuilt to a 0-4-0.

R and W Hawthorn built the G&SWR 99 Class designed by Patrick Stirling for the Glasgow and South Western Railway in 1855 with the 0-2-2-0 arrangement. The design was not successful and the locomotives were withdrawn by 1867.

The Mount Washington Cog Railway has eight 0-2-2-0's and only two are in working order, with three in storage and the remainder on display.
