= G&SWR 99 Class =

Steam locomotive class

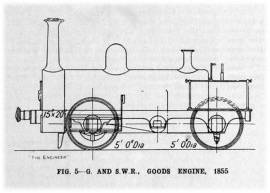
Type and origin
- Power type: Steam
- Designer: Patrick Stirling
- Builder: R and W Hawthorn
- Build date: 1855
- Total produced: 4
Specifications
- Configuration
  - Whyte: 0-2-2-0
- Gauge: 4 ft 8 1/2 in (1,435 mm)
- Driver dia.: 5 ft 0 in (1.52 m)
- Loco weight: 28 LT 9.75 cwt (63,812 lb; 28.945 t)
- Fuel type: Coal
- Cylinders: two
- Cylinder size: 15 in × 20 in (380 mm × 510 mm)
Career
- Withdrawn: 1866-1867
- Disposition: All scrapped

The Glasgow and South Western Railway (GSWR) 99 class was a class of four 0-2-2-0 steam locomotives designed in 1855.

== Development ==
Four examples of class designed by Patrick Stirling were built for the GSWR by R and W Hawthorn between April and August 1855. Little is known about the class which is variously described as having a "dummy crank" or a "crank axle."

== Withdrawal ==
The design was apparently unsuccessful, and all were withdrawn by James Stirling in 1866 and 1867.
