= G&SWR 403 Class =

British steam locomotive class (1915–1947)

Glasgow and South Western Railway 403 class
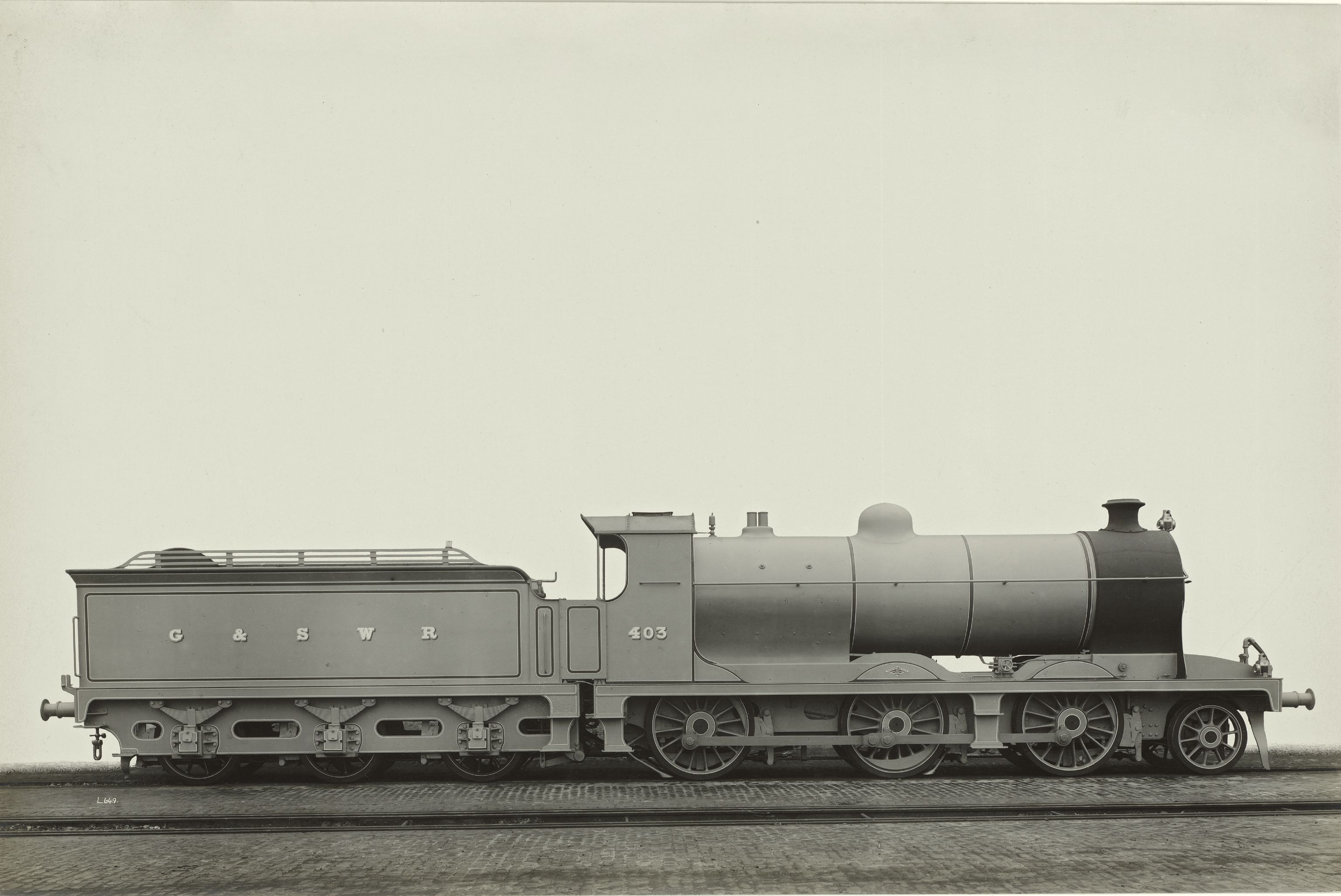
Type and origin
- Power type: Steam
- Designer: Peter Drummond
- Builder: North British Locomotive Co., Queen's Park Works, Glasgow
- Serial number: 21172–21182
- Build date: 1915
- Total produced: 11
Specifications
- Configuration
  - Whyte: 2-6-0
  - UIC: 1′C h2
- Gauge: 4 ft 8 1/2 in (1,435 mm) standard gauge
- Leading dia.: 3 ft 6 in (1,067 mm)
- Driver dia.: 5 ft 0 in (1,524 mm)
- Wheelbase: 6 ft 6 in (1.98 m) +; 8 ft 1 in (2.46 m) +; 9 ft 0 in (2.74 m) =; 23 ft 7 in (7.19 m)
- Length: 58 ft (17.68 m)
- Loco weight: 62 long tons (63.0 t; 69.4 short tons)
- Fuel type: Coal
- Water cap.: 3,970 imp gal (18,000 L; 4,770 US gal)
- Boiler pressure: 180 psi (1.24 MPa)
- Heating surface: 1,491 sq ft (138.5 m^{2})
- Superheater
  - Type: Robinson
  - Heating area: 211 sq ft (19.6 m^{2})
- Cylinders: Two
- Cylinder size: 19 1/2 in × 26 in (495 mm × 660 mm)
- Valve gear: Stephenson
Performance figures
- Tractive effort: 25,210 lbf (112.14 kN)
Career
- Class: G&SWR 403, 33, 51
- Power class: LMS: 4F
- Retired: 1935–1947
- Disposition: All scrapped

The Glasgow and South Western Railway (G&SWR) 403 (or 'Austrian Goods') Class was a class of 2-6-0 (mogul) steam locomotive designed by Peter Drummond, of which 11 were built in 1915 by the North British Locomotive Company at its Queens Park works. Originally built as the 403 class, as a result of renumbering they became known as the 33 Class in 1916 and then 51 Class in 1919, before passing to the London, Midland and Scottish Railway (LMS) on its formation in 1923, where they were given power classification 4F.

These freight-traffic locomotives were given the nickname Austrian Goods. The nickname was acquired because when the locomotives were delivered it was rumoured that they had been built from materials that NBL had gathered for a contract for Austria which was cancelled when World War I broke out. However, this rumour was unfounded as the design was entirely Drummond's and there is no evidence of any Austrian contract.

== History ==
The class was a development of Drummond's earlier 279 Class 0-6-0, fitted with superheating, pony trucks and numerous other improvements. They were far more successful than the 279s, being free-running and remarkably economical in coal and water. However, there were some reliability problems, notably with the design of the big ends and they were not considered suitable for passenger duties except in emergencies at reduced speed.

The locomotives were initially allocated to the G&SWR's Carlisle Currock shed for goods trains to Glasgow, Greenock, and Ayrshire. Under LMS ownership they were transferred to the former Caledonian Railway shed at Carlisle Kingmoor, after which they were also used on runs over the Caledonian main line and occasionally the Settle-Carlisle Line. As new LMS 'Crab' 2-6-0s took over their duties in the early 1930s, most were displaced from Kingmoor to various LMS sheds throughout Scotland, with some even operating from Inverness for a time.

In addition to their fuel economy, the type had the significant advantage that unlike most G&SWR locomotives, it was possible to fit a Caledonian Railway type boiler. This stopped the LMS from withdrawing them as non-standard as soon as their boilers became due for replacement. The class, therefore, outlived all other G&SWR tender locomotive types, being withdrawn and scrapped between 1935 and 1947.

== Numbering ==
Table of locomotives
GSWR (original) no.	GSWR (1915/16) no.	GSWR (1919) no.	LMS no.	Builder's no.	Delivered	Withdrawn
403	33	52	17821	NBL 21172	Sep 1915	Sep 1946
404	34	53	17822	NBL 21173	Sep 1915	Apr 1944
405	92	55	17824	NBL 21174	Sep 1915	Sep 1935
406	93	56	17825	NBL 21175	Sep 1915	Nov 1936
407	94	57	17826	NBL 21176	Sep 1915	Nov 1945
408	99	58	17827	NBL 21177	Sep 1915	Apr 1938
409	16	51	17820	NBL 21178	Nov 1915	Jan 1938
410	61	54	17823	NBL 21179	Oct 1915	Dec 1936
116	116	59	17828	NBL 21180	Nov 1915	Dec 1935
117	117	60	17829	NBL 21181	Nov 1915	Mar 1947
121	121	61	17830	NBL 21182	Nov 1915	Nov 1938
