= G&SWR 45 Class 0-6-2T =

G&SWR 45 Class (later G&SWR 1 Class)
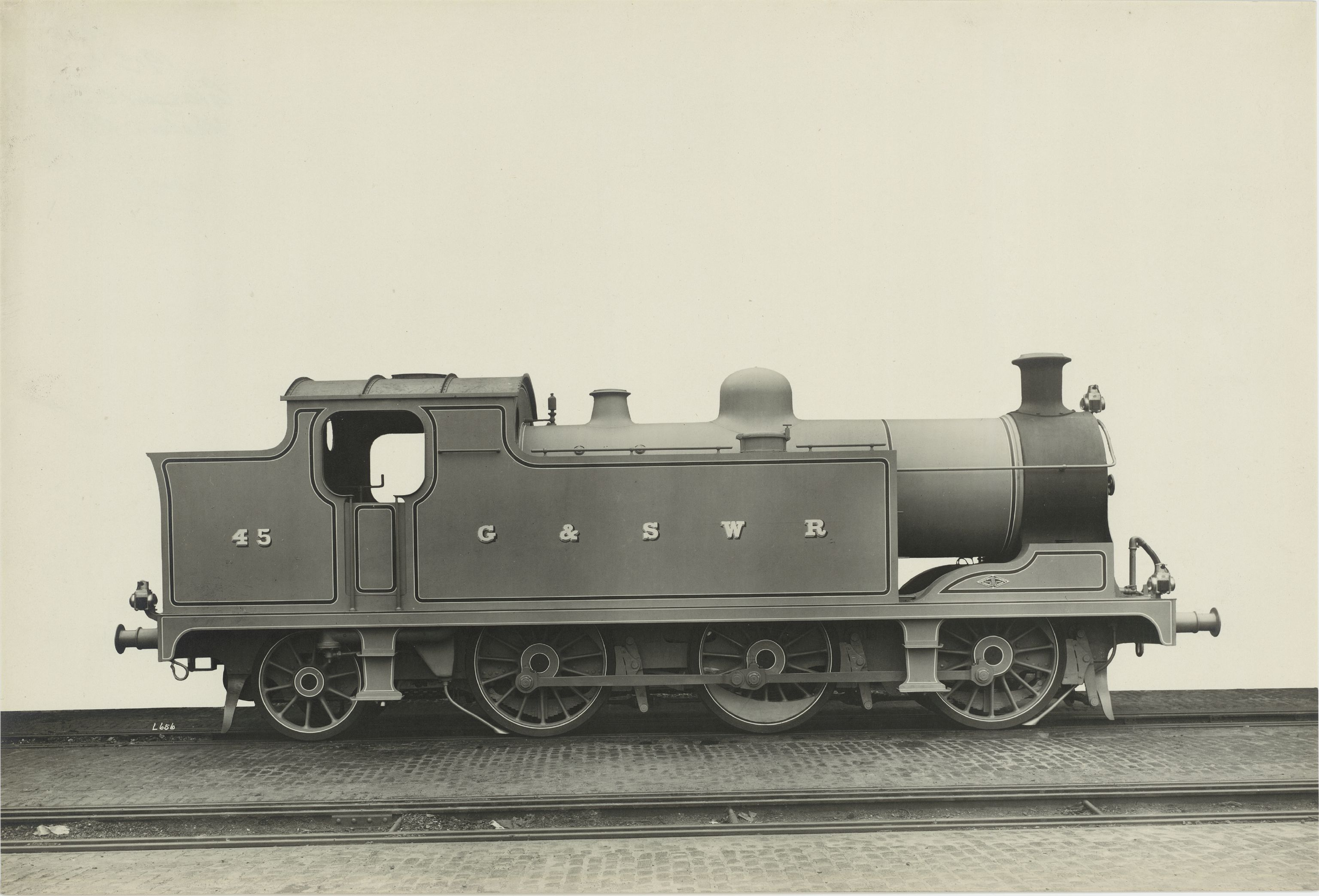
Type and origin
- Power type: Steam
- Designer: Peter Drummond
- Builder: North British Locomotive Company, Queen's Park Works, Glasgow
- Serial number: 21242–21247, 21507–21518, 22070–22079
- Build date: 1915-1919
- Total produced: 28
Specifications
- Configuration
  - Whyte: 0-6-2T
- Gauge: 4 ft 8 1/2 in (1,435 mm)
- Driver dia.: 5 ft 0 in (1.52 m)
- Loco weight: 66.2 long tons (67.3 t)
- Boiler pressure: 180 lbf/in^{2} (1,200 kPa; 13 kgf/cm^{2})
- Cylinders: Two
- Cylinder size: 18 1/4 in × 26 in (464 mm × 660 mm)
- Valve gear: Stephenson
Performance figures
- Tractive effort: 22,078 lbf (98.21 kN)
Career
- Operators: Glasgow and South Western Railway; London, Midland and Scottish Railway
- Class: G&SWR: 45
- Power class: LMS: 3F
- Withdrawn: 1936-1948

The G&SWR 45 Class were 0-6-2T steam locomotives designed by Peter Drummond for the Glasgow and South Western Railway (G&SWR) of which 18 were built in 1915-1917, followed by a further 10 of a slightly modified design in 1919 after Robert Whitelegg took over as Chief Mechanical Engineer.

== History ==
The G&SWR had historically made relatively little use of tank engines, and those which it owned in 1915 were exclusively small locomotives for shunting or suburban passenger services. However, Drummond's tenure as Locomotive Superintendent was a time of considerable change for G&SWR locomotive design and the 45 Class marked a departure from previous practice, as they were built for goods and mineral traffic which had previously used tender engines such as 0-6-0s. They were particularly associated with the Ayrshire coalfield, and were thus a Scottish equivalent to the many Welsh 0-6-2T locomotives employed on similar duties in the South Wales valleys.

Their design had many similarities to the Highland Railway X Class 0-6-4Ts which Drummond had built for his previous employer. The Whitelegg engines of 1919 had slightly increased water tank capacity and some minor detail changes, most obviously to the shape of the cabside cutouts, and were employed on similar traffic. Shortly prior to these entering service the entire G&SWR locomotive fleet had been renumbered, and the type now became known as the 1 Class under the new numbering system.

The locomotives were much more successful than some of Drummond's earlier designs for the G&SWR, although their limited water tankage compared to tender engines became a problem after they passed into London, Midland and Scottish Railway (LMS) ownership in 1923. The LMS wanted to increase the loads which former G&SWR locomotives were permitted to haul, and whilst the 0-6-2Ts were capable of hauling heavier trains they lacked sufficient water capacity to complete longer journeys. They were therefore redeployed to shunting and short-distance trip workings, and the class became quite widely dispersed.

By the time withdrawals commenced in 1936 some examples were allocated to Carlisle, Workington and various former Midland Railway depots elsewhere in England. One even spent some years banking on the Highland Main Line. During World War II the surviving locomotives were all returned to the former G&SWR system. Only one, No. 16905, survived into British Railways (BR) ownership in 1948, and this was withdrawn the same year without receiving its BR number. Four locomotives were sold into industrial service and the last survivor was the former LMS 16908 which worked at Ashington Colliery until 1955. All were scrapped.

== Numbering and locomotive histories ==
The class was originally designated 45 Class but, after the G&SWR's 1919 renumbering, this was changed to 1 Class. The LMS initially numbered them 16400-16427 but in 1926 changed this to 16900-16927 to make space for new LMS 3F 0-6-0Ts.

Table of locomotives
G&SWR no. (pre-1919)	G&SWR no. (post-1919)	LMS no. (pre-1926)	LMS no. (post-1926)	builder's number	date delivered	date withdrawn	notes
45	23	16422	16922	NBL 21242	Dec 1915	Dec 1945	
84	24	16423	16923	NBL 21243	Dec 1915	Jan 1938	
90	25	16424	16924	NBL 21244	Dec 1915	May 1936	
91	26	16425	16925	NBL 21245	Dec 1915	Mar 1936	
122	11	16410	16910	NBL 21246	Jan 1916	Nov 1936	sold to Robert McAlpine & Sons no.80
284	22	16421	16921	NBL 21247	Jan 1916	Dec 1945	
101	27	16426	16926	NBL 21507	May 1917	Dec 1945	
102	28	16427	16927	NBL 21508	May 1917	Feb 1938	
141	12	16411	16911	NBL 21509	Jun 1917	Mar 1946	
142	13	16412	16912	NBL 21510	Jun 1917	Jun 1938	
143	14	16413	16913	NBL 21511	Jun 1917	Jan 1938	
144	15	16414	16914	NBL 21512	Jun 1917	Jun 1937	
145	16	16415	16915	NBL 21513	Jun 1917	Mar 1938	
146	17	16416	16916	NBL 21514	Jun 1917	Feb 1936	
147	18	16417	16917	NBL 21515	Jun 1917	Aug 1940	
148	19	16418	16918	NBL 21516	Jun 1917	May 1936	
149	20	16419	16919	NBL 21517	Jun 1917	Nov 1937	
150	21	16420	16920	NBL 21518	Jun 1917	Nov 1947	
	1	16400	16900	NBL 22070	May 1919	Dec 1939	
	2	16401	16901	NBL 22071	May 1919	Feb 1944	
	3	16402	16902	NBL 22072	May 1919	Dec 1938	
	4	16403	16903	NBL 22073	May 1919	Nov 1936	sold to Robert McAlpine & Sons no.81
	5	16404	16904	NBL 22074	May 1919	Feb 1937	sold to Ashington Coal Company no.1
	6	16405	16905	NBL 22075	Jun 1919	Apr 1948	withdrawn before receiving BR number 56905
	7	16406	16906	NBL 22076	Jun 1919	Jun 1938	
	8	16407	16907	NBL 22077	Jun 1919	Nov 1945	
	9	16408	16908	NBL 22078	Jun 1919	Jun 1937	sold to Ashington Coal Company no.2
	10	16409	16909	NBL 22079	Jun 1919	Jun 1936	
