= Hugh Smellie =

- Born: 3 March 1840; Ayr
- Died: 19 April 1891 (aged 51); Bridge of Allan
- Engineering career
- Discipline: Mechanical engineering

Hugh Smellie (3 March 1840, in Ayr – 19 April 1891, at Bridge of Allan) was a Scottish engineer.

He was locomotive superintendent of the Maryport and Carlisle Railway from 1870–1878, the Glasgow and South Western Railway from 1878–1890 and the Caledonian Railway in 1890.

== See also ==
- Locomotives of the Glasgow and South Western Railway
- Locomotives of the London, Midland and Scottish Railway

Business positions
Preceded by George Tosh	Locomotive Superintendent of the Maryport and Carlisle Railway; 1870-1878	Succeeded by J. Campbell
Preceded by James Stirling	Locomotive Superintendent of the Glasgow and South Western Railway; 1878-1890	Succeeded by James Manson
Preceded by Dugald Drummond	Locomotive Superintendent of the Caledonian Railway; 1890	Succeeded by John Lambie
