= James Manson (engineer) =

Scottish engineer

- Born: 1845; Saltcoats, Ayrshire
- Died: 5 June 1935 (aged 89–90); Kilmarnock
- Engineering career
- Discipline: Mechanical engineering

James Manson (1845–1935) was a Scottish engineer, born in Saltcoats, Ayrshire. He was Locomotive Superintendent of two Scottish railway companies.

== Career ==
Manson obtained employment at the Kilmarnock works of the Glasgow and South Western Railway (GSWR) in September 1861 and worked there for eight years. He then spent one year at Barclay Curle and Company, shipbuilders of Govan. This was followed by five years at sea with the Bibby Line during which time he became a chief engineer. He worked again at the GSWR Kilmarnock works from 1875 to October 1883. His next appointment was as Locomotive Superintendent at the Great North of Scotland Railway but he returned to the GSWR in 1890 or 1891 and was appointed Locomotive Superintendent.

== Retirement and death ==
Manson retired from the GSWR in 1911. He died in Kilmarnock on 5 June 1935.

== See also ==
- Locomotives of the Great North of Scotland Railway
- Locomotives of the Glasgow and South Western Railway

Business positions
Preceded by William Cowan	Locomotive Superintendent of the Great North of Scotland Railway; 1883–1890	Succeeded by James Johnson
Preceded by Hugh Smellie	Locomotive Superintendent of the Glasgow and South Western Railway; 1890–1911	Succeeded by Peter Drummond
