= James Stirling (engineer, born 1835) =

British locomotive engineer (1835–1917)

James Stirling (1835–1917)
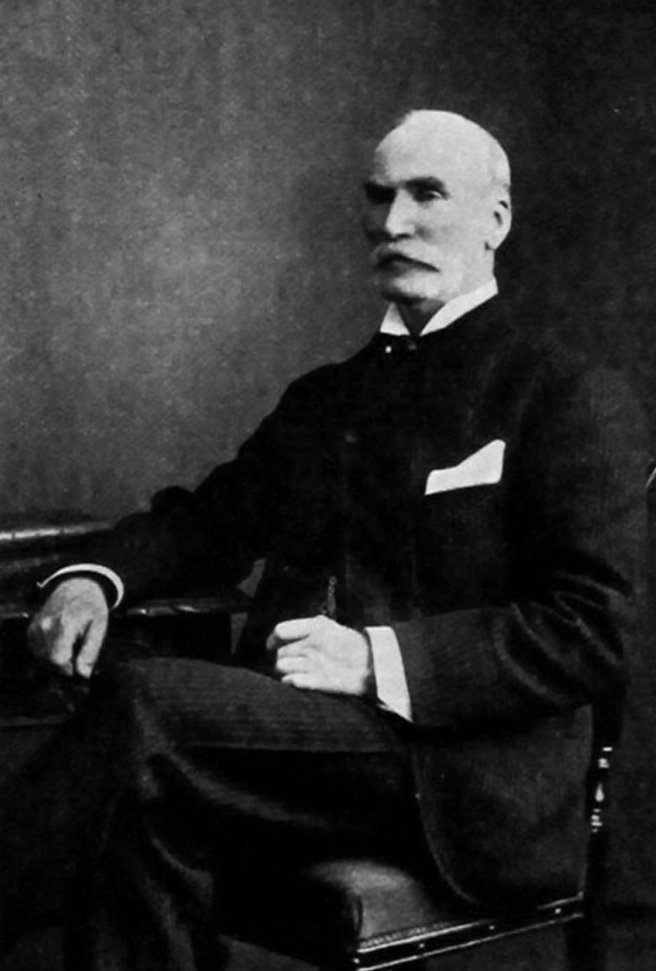
- Born: 2 October 1835; Galston, East Ayrshire, Scotland
- Died: 12 January 1917 (aged 81); Ashford, Kent, England
- Parent: Robert Stirling
- Engineering career
- Discipline: Locomotive engineer
- Employer(s): Glasgow and South Western Railway; South Eastern Railway

James Stirling (1835–1917) was a Scottish mechanical engineer. He was Locomotive Superintendent of the Glasgow and South Western Railway and later the South Eastern Railway. Stirling was born on 2 October 1835, a son of Robert Stirling, rector of Galston, East Ayrshire. His brother was Patrick Stirling, Locomotive Engineer of the Great Northern Railway and his nephew Matthew Stirling was the Locomotive Superintendent of the Hull and Barnsley Railway.

== Career ==
=== Glasgow and South Western Railway ===
After working for a village millwright he joined the Glasgow and South Western Railway (GSWR) where he was apprenticed to his brother Patrick, who had been Locomotive Superintendent of that railway since 1853. On completion of his apprenticeship, he spent a year as a fitter at Sharp Stewart in Manchester, before returning to the GSWR drawing office at Kilmarnock; he later became works manager. On 1 March 1866, his brother Patrick left the GSWR for the Great Northern Railway (GNR), where he became Works Manager at Doncaster, and James was appointed Locomotive Superintendent of the GSWR in his place. Patrick became the Locomotive Superintendent of the GNR from 1 October 1866),

=== South Eastern Railway ===
At the end of June 1878 he left the GSWR for the South Eastern Railway. He retired in 1898 and died in Ashford, Kent in 1917.

== Locomotives ==
Like his brother, James Stirling favoured the domeless boiler, known as the "straightback" and cabs for the enginemen. Although not the first British locomotive engineer to use the 4-4-0 type, he was the first to produce a 4-4-0 which could be regarded as successful, with his G&SWR 6 Class of 1873. Stirling also invented a steam reverser, using it on most of his designs from 1874.

On the South Eastern Railway, Stirling designed just six classes of locomotive in his twenty years – three of these were of the 4-4-0 type for express passenger work, each more capable than the last; his other three classes were an 0-6-0 for goods, an 0-4-4T for suburban passenger, and an 0-6-0T for shunting. At his retirement at the end of 1898, the SER had 459 engines, of which 384 were to Stirling's design, and seven others had been purchased to outside design; ten more to Stirling's design would be built in 1899.

Class	Wheel arrangement	Built	Total	Notes	Rebuilt	Ref
Glasgow and South Western Railway (1866–78)
157 class	0-4-0ST	1866–70	5			
159 class	2-2-2WT	1867	1			
8 class	2-4-0	1868–70	15			
75 class	2-4-0	1870–71	10			
187 class	0-4-2	1870–71	20			
65 class	0-4-0	1871–74	22			
208 class	0-4-2	1873	10			
6 class	4-4-0	1873–7	22			
218 class	0-4-0ST	1873	2			
220 class	0-4-0ST	1874	1			
221 class	0-4-2	1874–78	60			
113 class	0-4-0ST	1875–76	6			
13 class	0-6-0	1877–78	12			
1 class	0-4-4T	1879	4	design modified by Hugh Smellie prior to construction		
South Eastern Railway (1878–98)
O class	0-6-0	1878–99	122	last 5 built by SE&CR	59 to O1, 1903–32	
A class	4-4-0	1879–81	12			
Q class	0-4-4T	1881–97	118		55 to Q1, 1903–17	
F class	4-4-0	1883–98	88		76 to F1, 1903–20	
R class	0-6-0T	1888–98	25		13 to R1, 1910–22	
B class	4-4-0	1898–99	29	last 5 built by SE&CR	27 to B1, 1910–27	

== See also ==
- Locomotives of the Glasgow and South Western Railway
- Locomotives of the Southern Railway

== Notes ==
Business positions
Preceded by Patrick Stirling	Locomotive Superintendent of the Glasgow and South Western Railway; 1866-1878	Succeeded by Hugh Smellie
Preceded by Richard Mansell	Locomotive Superintendent of South Eastern Railway; 1878–1898	Succeeded by Harry Wainwright
