= Kilmarnock Locomotive Works =

Coordinates: 55.6138°N 4.5087°W

Kilmarnock Locomotive Works was built in 1856 by the Glasgow and South Western Railway (GSWR) in Kilmarnock, East Ayrshire, Scotland.

== History ==
The Glasgow and South Western Railway was formed in 1850 and Patrick Stirling appointed locomotive superintendent in 1853. The existing repair facilities in Crook Street, Glasgow were inadequate so he proposed a new locomotive construction and repair works on a 13-acre (5.3 ha) site at Kilmarnock. This was completed in 1856 and the first locomotive built the following year.

A total of 392 locomotives had been built by 1921 when locomotive building ceased. However, the works remained open for locomotive repair throughout both London Midland and Scottish Railway ownership 1923-1947 and by British Railways until 1952. Thereafter it was retained for repairing cranes used by the Scottish Region, finally closing in 1959. However, in 1971 part of the works re-opened under the control of the Chief Civil Engineer, Scottish Region, as a heavy repair workshops for the Scottish Region Civil Engineers Rail Plant fleet of Tampers, Ballast Cleaners, Ballast Regulators etc.
