= Steam dome =

Water vapor separator in locomotives

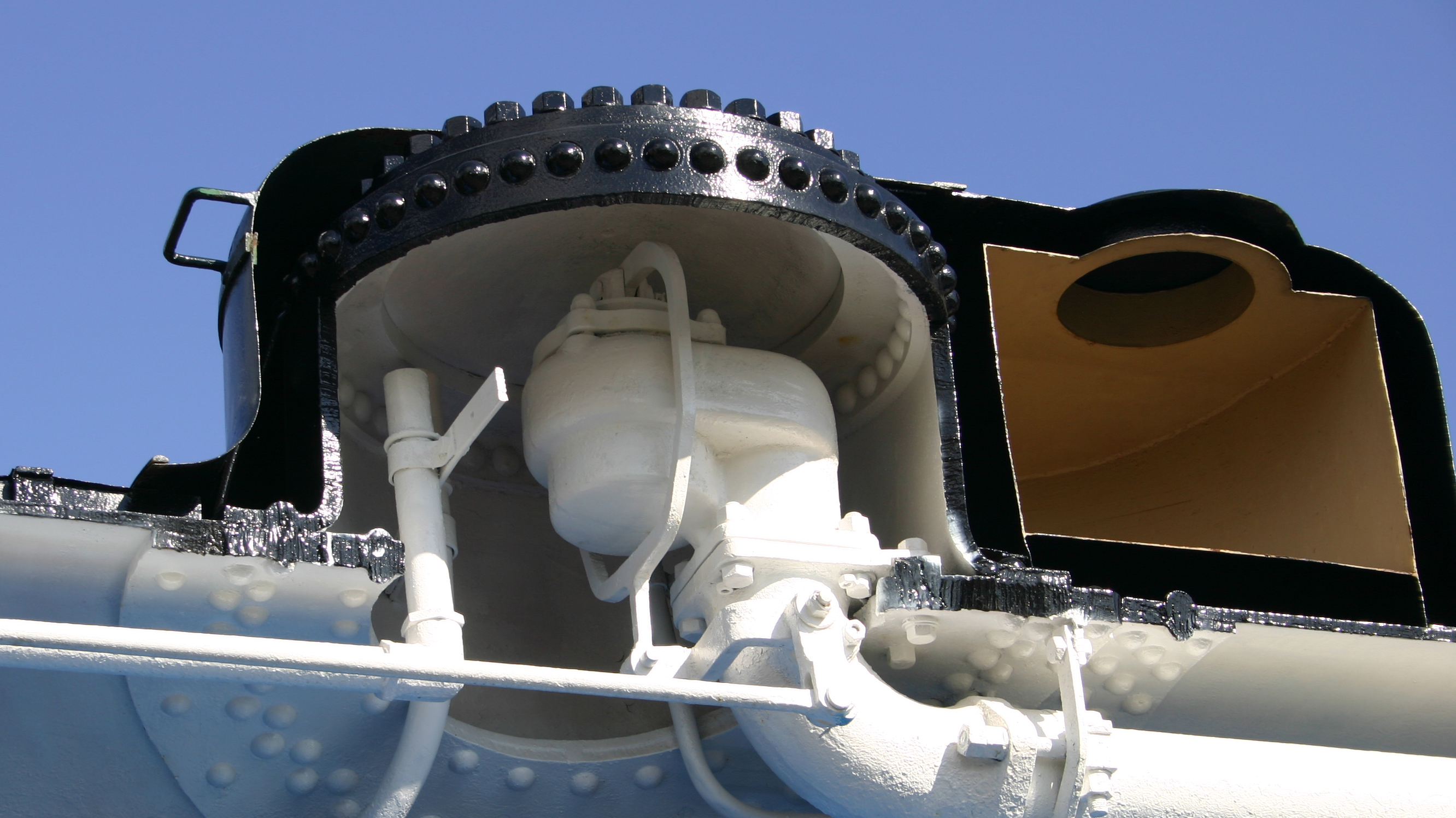
Cutaway section of a steam dome, showing the regulator inside

The steam dome is a vessel fitted to the top of the boiler of a steam engine. It contains the opening to the main steam pipe and its purpose is to allow this opening to be kept well above the water level in the boiler. This arrangement acts as a simple steam separator and minimises the risk that water will be carried over to the cylinders where it might cause a hydraulic lock, also known as priming.

A steam dome should not be confused with a sand dome.

== Railway locomotives ==
The first locomotive with a deliberate dome added to the boiler barrel was Stephenson's 'Phoenix' an 0-2-2 for the Liverpool and Manchester Railway in 1830. Many other locomotives built from the late 1830s instead used either the 'haycock' boiler, where the firebox outer casing was raised high above the main part of the boiler, forming a steam dome, or Gooch's development of this where the semi-cylindrical firebox wrapper was raised above the boiler barrel.

The most vigorous boiling in a locomotive boiler takes place around the hottest part, the firebox. This was a drawback to the haycock arrangement, and led to the general adoption of the separate dome instead. The dome is placed forward of the firebox, in an area of less vigorous boiling and thus fewer suspended water droplets.

=== Dome position ===
From the 1840s, boiler barrels were constructed from hoops of rolled iron, or later steel sheet. As boilers were longer than the width of the available iron sheet, two or three hoops were required. For strength, the dome was always placed in the centre of a hoop, rather than spanning a joint. Early boilers used narrow plates and thus had a centrally located dome, in the centre of the middle hoop. Later boilers could use the wider plates then available and used two hoops, so as to reduce the number of riveted joints. These domes were thus placed at a quarter of the barrel's length (from the front of the firebox wrapper).

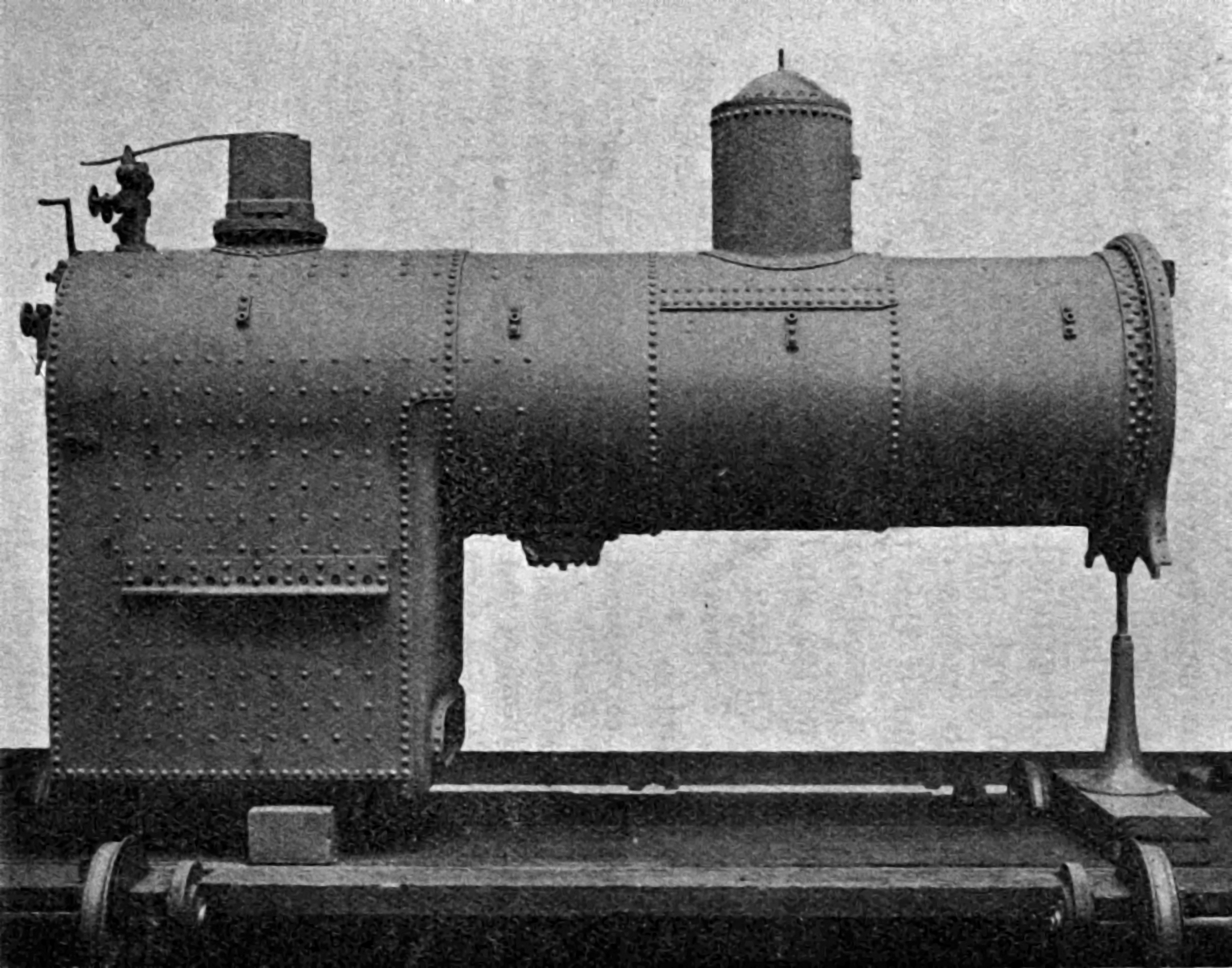
Boiler made of three hoops, with the dome placed centrally

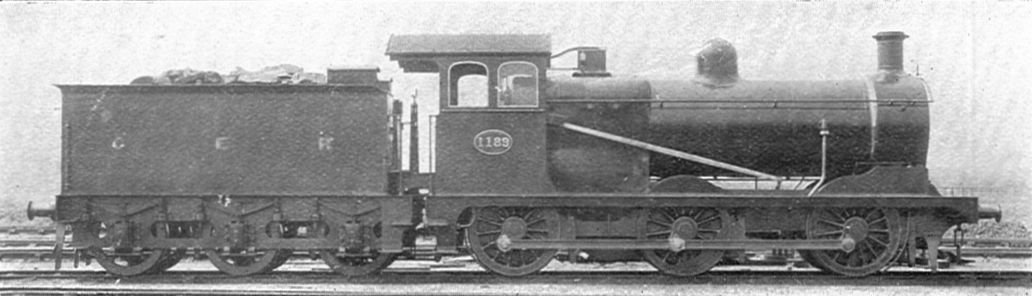
Great Eastern F48 0-6-0, with a two-hoop boiler barrel and thus the dome moved rearwards

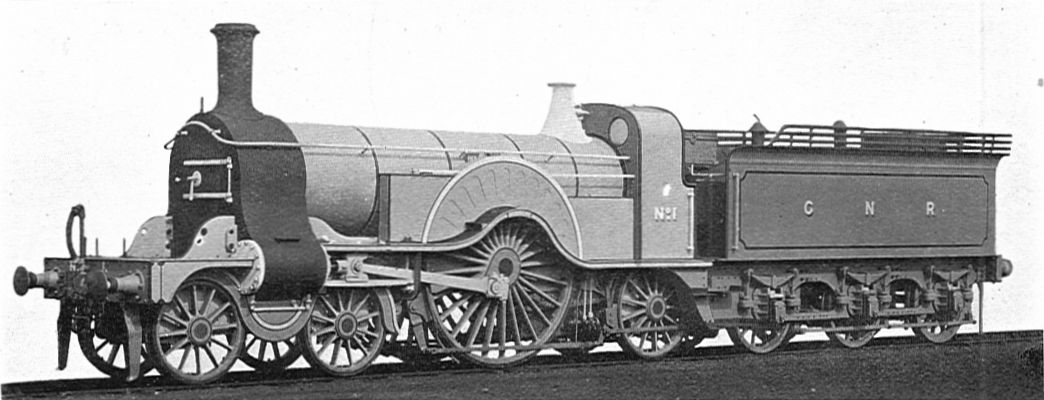
GNR Stirling 4-2-2 locomotive with domeless boiler

=== Domeless boilers ===
Some locomotive designers in Britain continued to use domeless boilers even after the use of steam domes became commonplace. The square-topped Belpaire firebox allows steam to be conveniently collected at its top corners and therefore locomotives with Belpaire fireboxes often dispensed with a dome, for example express engines such as the GWR Castle Class (the large brass boiler fitting on a Castle is the distinctive GWR safety valve cover, not a dome). Ultimately, the restrictive British loading gauge was a major factor which determined the size of the dome, with large-boilered express locomotives, such as the LNER Class A1, only having space for a very shallow dome.

== Traction engines ==
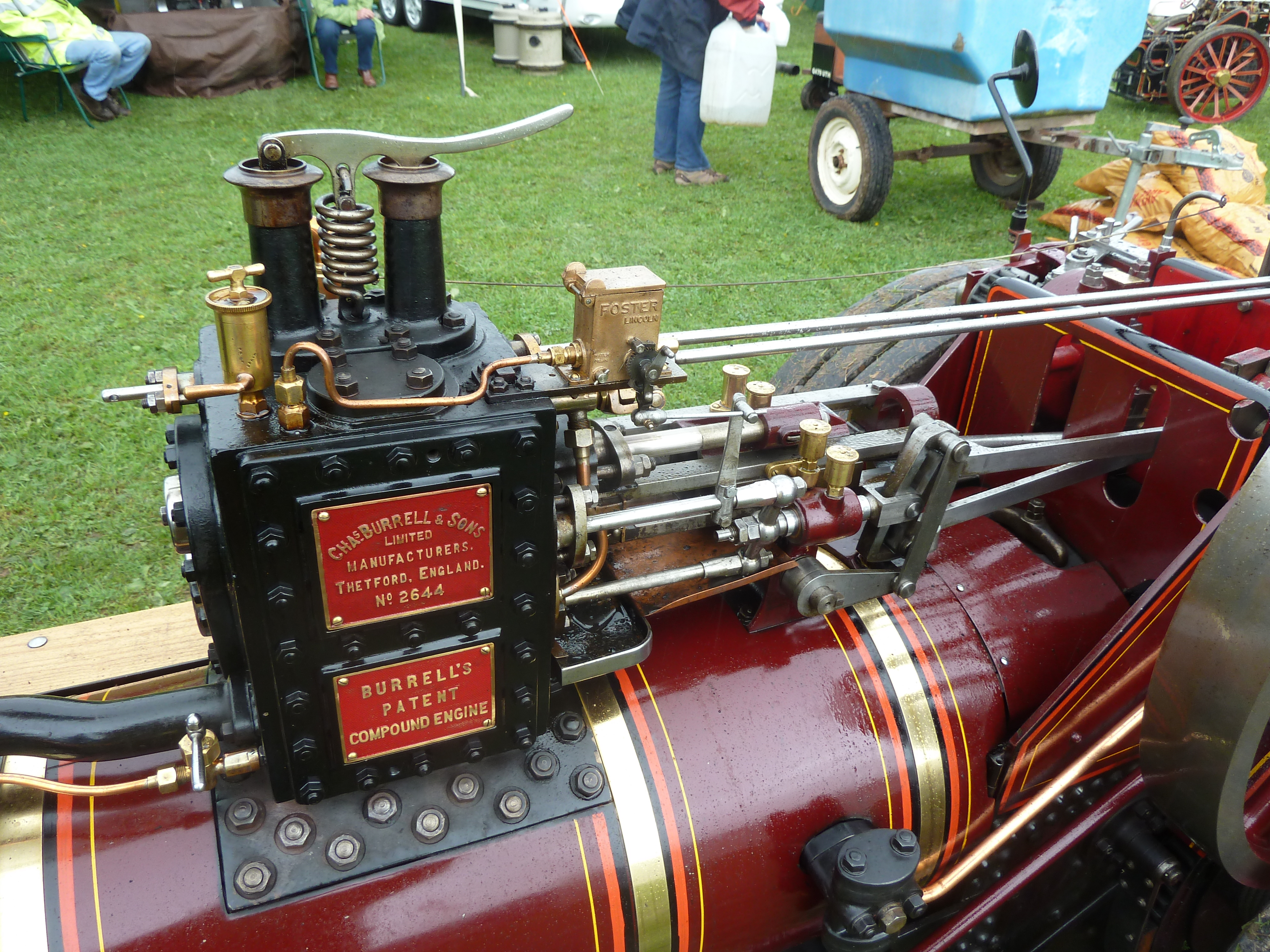
1:2 model of a Burrell single-crank compound traction engine. Note the Ramsbottom safety valve mounted on top.

Traction engines in Britain were rarely fitted with a steam dome. As their cylinder block was mounted directly onto the top of the boiler barrel, the casting for this was cast with a large steam jacket around the cylinder(s). This jacket was large and tall enough to act as a steam dome. The base of the cylinder casting was a curved saddle to fit directly onto the boiler. Holes drilled in the boiler allowed steam to pass through, usually more than one smaller hole, to avoid reducing the boiler strength.

The passages of the steam jacket were large enough that the safety valve could also be mounted on the cylinder block. The regulator could also conveniently be built into the casting, immediately between the dome passage and the valve chest, without requiring long steam pipes.

US traction engines were commonly fitted with domes, as were the British-built Howard engines.

== Stationary and marine boilers ==
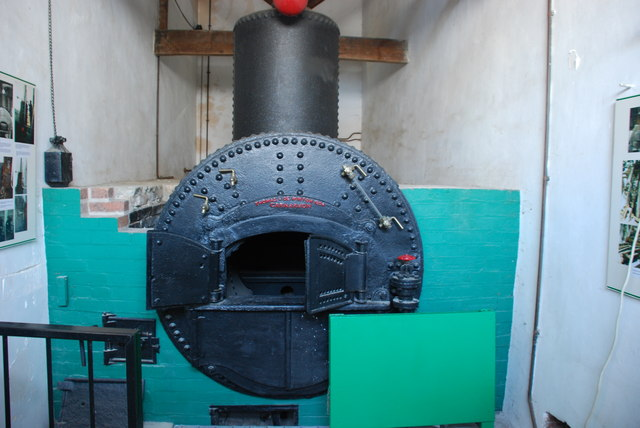
Cornish boiler, with a 'Dolly Varden' dome

Most designs of stationary boilers did not generally require a steam dome, as they were built large enough to allow adequate steam space within their main drum. Water-tube designs had a suitable steam drum mounted high above their evaporating surface and this performed a similar function.

Some designs retained a steam dome: German and French practice often fitted them to Scotch marine boilers and other naval boilers such as the Normand, where British practice would do without. Where Cornish boilers were unusually fitted with a dome, in Cornwall this was known as a 'Dolly Varden', from the stovepipe hats forming part of the local women's traditional costume.

The boiling water reactor uses a steam dome at its exhaust.

== See also ==
- Sandbox (locomotive) - on steam locomotives this was also generally a dome atop the boiler
