= Patrick Stirling (railway engineer) =

British locomotive engineer (1820–1895)

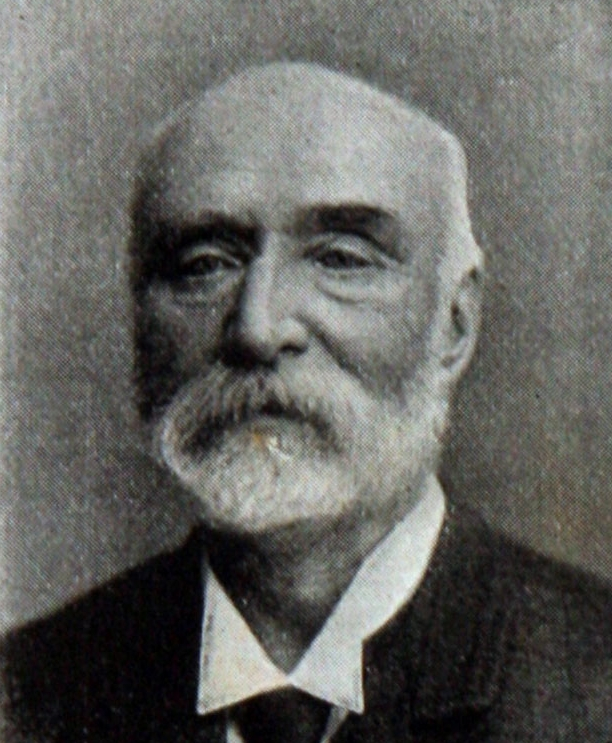
- Born: 29 June 1820; Kilmarnock, Scotland
- Died: 11 November 1895 (aged 75); Doncaster, England
- Resting place: Hyde Park Cemetery, Doncaster
- Children: Matthew Stirling
- Parent: Robert Stirling
- Engineering career
- Discipline: Locomotive engineer
- Employer: Great Northern Railway
- Significant design: Stirling single

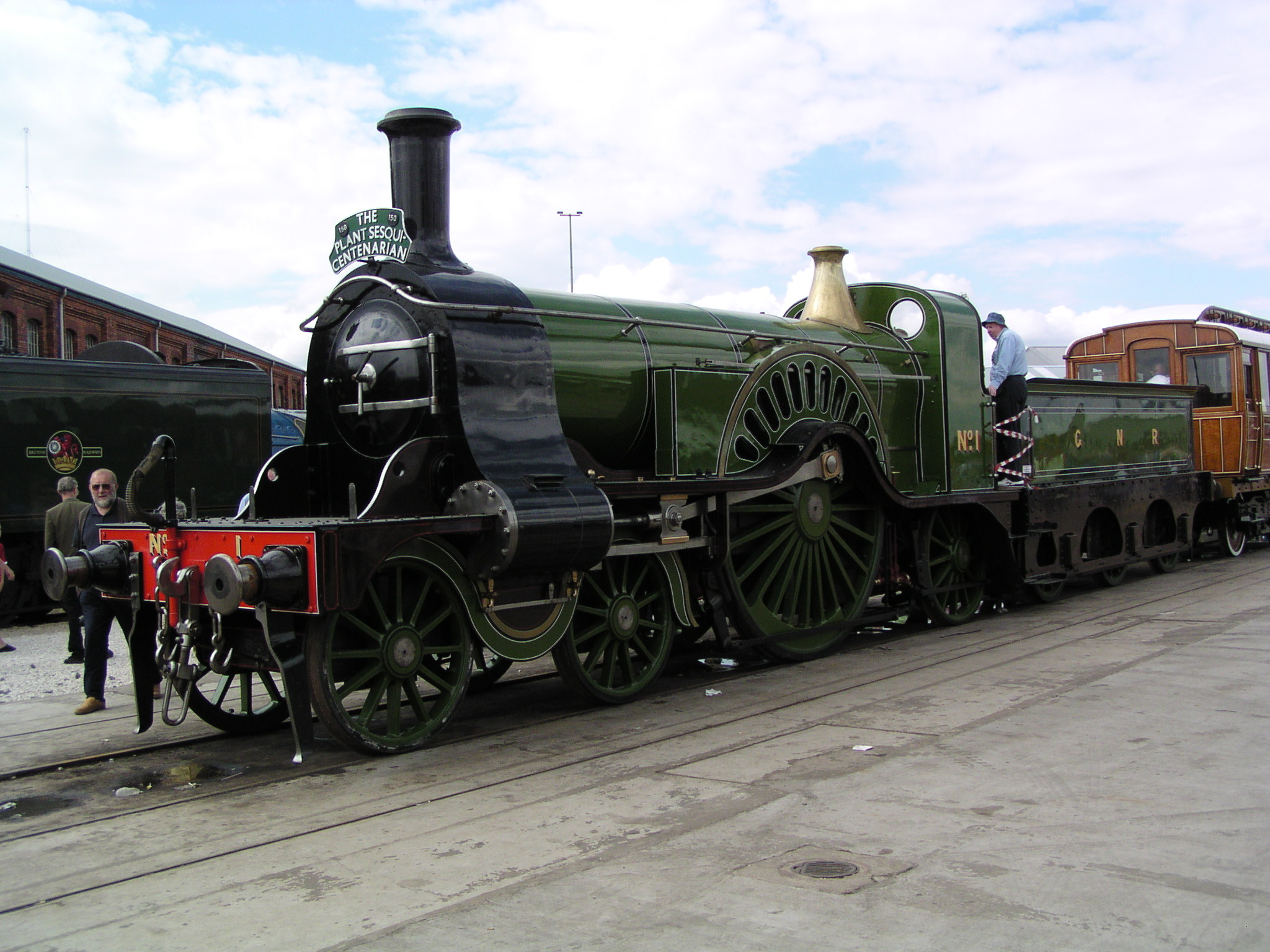
GNR Stirling 4-2-2 no. 1 at Doncaster Works open day on 27 July 2003

Patrick Stirling (29 June 1820 – 11 November 1895) was a Scottish railway engineer, and Locomotive Superintendent of the Great Northern Railway of England. His father Robert Stirling was also an engineer. His brother James Stirling was also a locomotive engineer. His son Matthew Stirling was CME of the Hull and Barnsley Railway. Another son, Patrick Stirling played for Doncaster Rovers and was mayor of Doncaster.

== Career ==
Patrick Stirling was Locomotive Superintendent of the Glasgow and South Western Railway from 1853 to 1866. He moved to the Great Northern Railway that year, where he constructed several locomotive types. He was succeeded by Henry Ivatt.

== Stirling Single ==
Stirling's most famous design was the 4-2-2 Stirling Single, dubbed the "eight-footer" after its 8 ft 1 in (2.46 m) driving wheel. The class set records during the Race to the North in 1895 with average train speed between engine changes exceeding 60 mph (97 km/h).

| Preceded by First loco engineer | Locomotive Superintendent of the Glasgow and South Western Railway; 1853-1866 | Succeeded by James Stirling |
| Preceded by Archibald Sturrock | Locomotive Superintendent of Great Northern Railway; 1866 – 1895 | Succeeded by Henry Ivatt |
