= Kampot railway station =

Railway station in Kampot, Cambodia

Kampot ស្ថានីយ៍រថភ្លើងកំពត

General information
- Other names: Kampot Train Station
- Location: National Road 3 Kampot, Kampot Province; Cambodia
- Coordinates: 10°37′36″N 104°11′21″E
- Owner: Ministry of Public Works and Transport
- Operator: Royal Railway Cambodia
- Line: Southern Line
- Distance: 146 km (91 mi) from Phnom Penh
- Platforms: 1
- Tracks: 2

Construction
- Parking: Available
- Accessible: Yes
- Architect: Vann Molyvann
- Architectural style: New Khmer

Other information
- Status: Operational
- Station code: KPT
- Fare zone: Residential
- Website: royalrailway.com.kh

History
- Opened: 17 May 1967; 59 years ago
- Rebuilt: 2010-2016 (renovation)

Key dates
- Reopened: 9 April 2016; 10 years ago
Route map
Location

Kampot railway station (Khmer: ស្ថានីយ៍រថភ្លើងកំពត, Sathaniy Rothphleung Kâmpôt, Khmer pronunciation: [sɑtʰaˈnij rɔtʰˈpʰləəŋ kɑmˈpɔt]) formerly Kampot railway area (Khmer: តំបន់ផ្លូវដែកកំពត, Tâmbôn Phlov Daek Kâmpôt, Khmer pronunciation: [tɑmˈbɔn pʰluə daek kɑmˈpɔt]) is a historical yet operational railway station in Kampot, Cambodia. It serves the Southern Railway Line connecting Phnom Penh and Sihanoukville, operated by The Royal Railway. The station located near National Road 3 and continues to serve local commuters, tourists, and freight.

== History ==
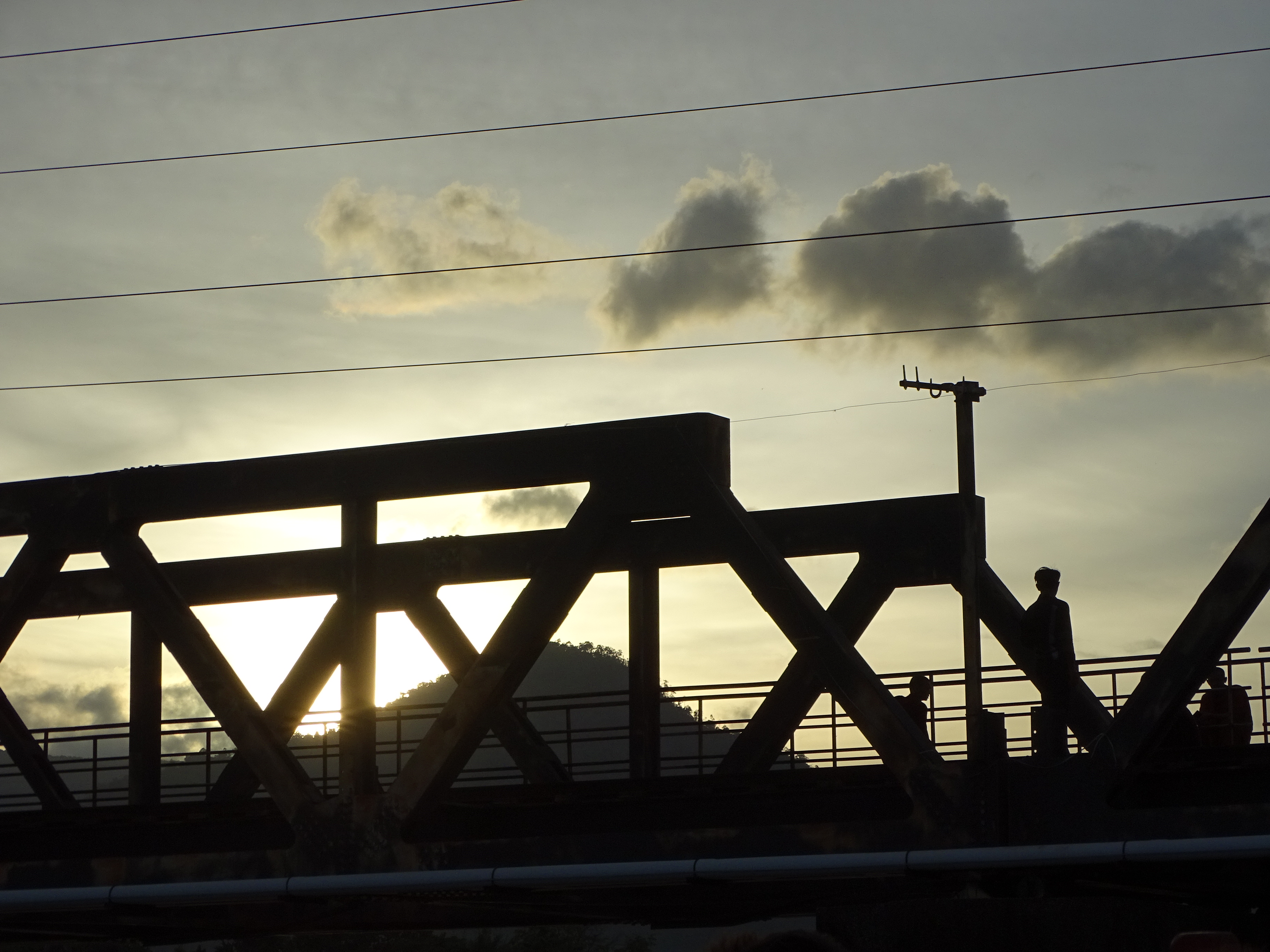
Kampot Railway Bridge, photographed under the bridge

The railway in Kampot was constructed in the 1960s and completed in 1967, and the station was also completed in May 1967. Built during Cambodia's post-independence period, the station building was a single-story building with a gabled roof and open platforms.

The station was built on meter-gauge railway tracks and is located near a rail bridge crossing the Preaek Tuek Chhu River, an important structure for trains traveling through Kampot.

Railway operations declined during the Cambodian Civil War and the Khmer Rouge period (1975–1979), when infrastructure across the country suffered from neglect and damage, leaving the station and surrounding railway facilities in poor condition.

In February 1998, the nearby railway bridge was damaged after a train overloaded the weakened structure, which had already deteriorated from years of poor maintenance and earlier wartime damage. The disruption temporarily halted rail traffic across the river and required cargo to be transferred by road between trains on opposite sides. The bridge was repaired with an emergency budget of about US$90,000 and reopened on 7 June 1998.

During the early 2000s, railway infrastructure around Kampot, including the tracks and the bridge, underwent rehabilitation supported by the Cambodian government and international partners. The station itself also received structural repairs during this period to stabilize the historic building after decades of disrepair.

Between 2010 and 2016, the station building was refurbished as part of the wider railway rehabilitation program funded by the Asian Development Bank and Australian Aid. Restoration work included cleaning and repainting the structure while maintaining its distinctive red roof and white exterior.

Passenger services officially returned to Kampot station on 9 April 2016 following the rehabilitation of the railway line. In recent years, the station has also been used for cultural and heritage purposes, displaying historical photographs and materials related to Cambodia's railway history.

== Architecture ==
Kampot station is considered an example of Cambodia's New Khmer Architecture movement, which developed during the 1950s and 1960s. The design of the station has been widely attributed to Cambodian modernist architect Vann Molyvann, a leading figure in the development of modern public architecture in Cambodia.

One of the station's most distinctive features is its triangular red-tiled roof with pointed concrete elements. The zig-zag roof structure was designed to provide protection from heavy tropical rainfall while allowing natural ventilation inside the building.

The station follows an open-air layout inspired by traditional Khmer houses. The ticket hall was designed as a large open-plan space without doors separating the road, the interior waiting area, and the platform, allowing continuous airflow and a more comfortable environment for passengers in the tropical climate.

The high ceiling is supported by reinforced concrete columns that remain visible as part of the building's modernist design. The original appearance of the station featured white exterior walls contrasted with bright red roof tiles, a color scheme that has largely been preserved during later renovations.

== See also ==
- Southern Line (Cambodia)
- List of railway stations in Cambodia
