= Vietnam Railways 141 Class =

Locomotive in use in Vietnam

141 Class
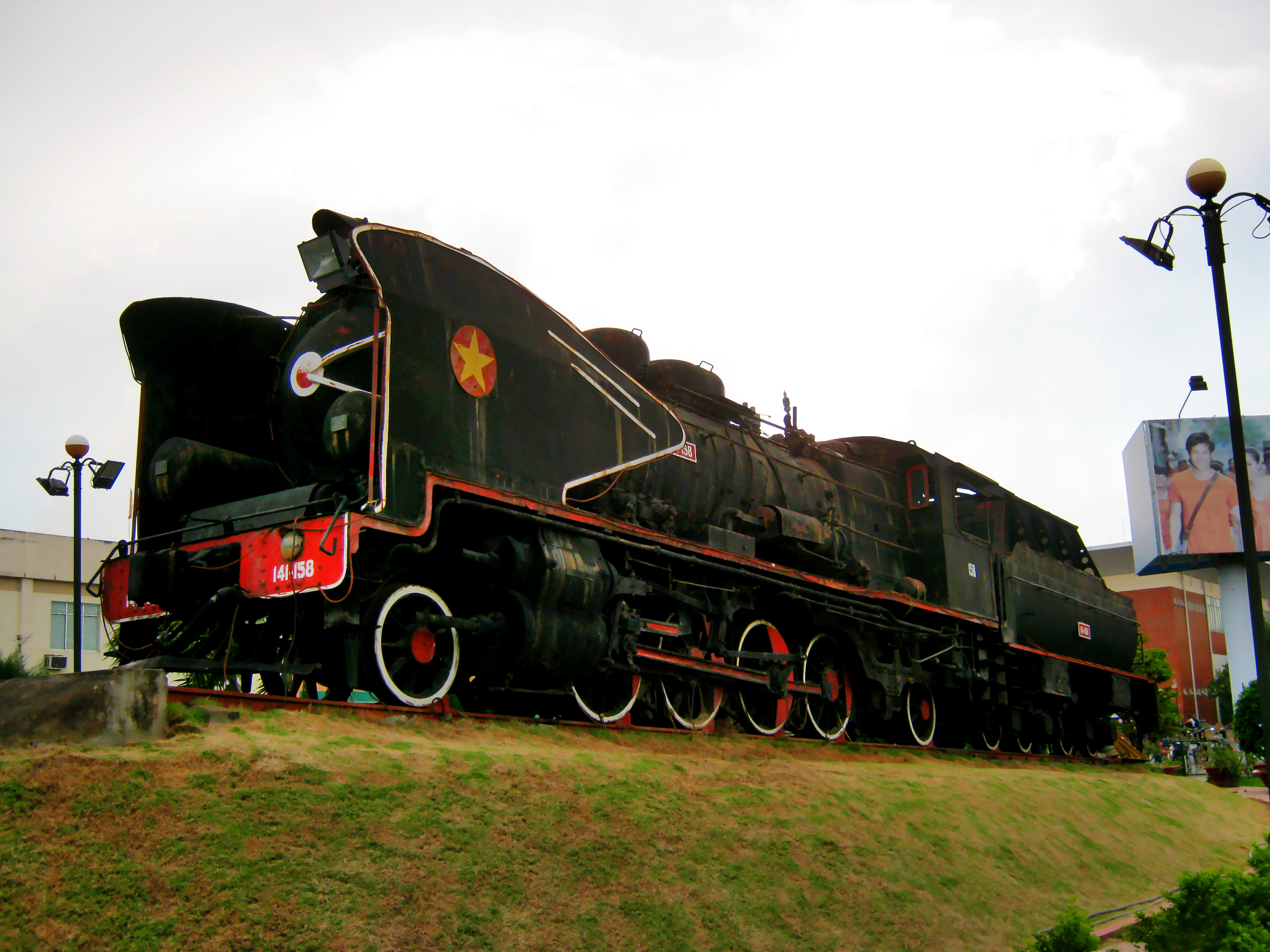
Type and origin
- Power type: Steam
- Builder: Société Alsacienne de Constructions Mécaniques; Tangshan Railway Vehicle; Gia Lam Train Company
- Model: Type SCAM 203
- Build date: 1947-1952 (SCAM version); 1964-1974 (Tangshan & Gia Lam version)
- Total produced: 98
- Rebuilder: Gia Lam Train Company; Di An Train Company
- Rebuild date: 1970-1974 (Gia Lam 141-A-101~141-A-109); 2017 (Di An 141-159, 141-165, 141-190)
- Number rebuilt: 12
Specifications
- Configuration
  - Whyte: 2-8-2
  - UIC: 2′D1′h3S
- Gauge: 1,000 mm (3 ft 3 3/8 in) (Vietnam & Cambodia); 1,067 mm (3 ft 6 in) (Congo)
- Leading dia.: 0,900 mm (35.43 in)
- Driver dia.: 1,200 mm (47.24 in)
- Trailing dia.: 0,900 mm (35.43 in)
- Length: 11.450 m (37 ft 6.8 in); 19.010 m (62 ft 4.4 in) (with tender)
- Width: 2.700 m (8 ft 10.3 in)
- Height: 4.244 m (13 ft 11.1 in)
- Axle load: 12.5 t (12.3 long tons; 13.8 short tons)
- Loco weight: 50 t (49 long tons; 55 short tons)
- Tender weight: 7 t (6.9 long tons; 7.7 short tons)
- Total weight: 57 t (56 long tons; 63 short tons)
- Fuel capacity: 6 t (5.9 long tons; 6.6 short tons) (coal)
- Cylinders: 2
- Cylinder size: 450 mm × 610 mm (17.717 in × 24.016 in) bore x stroke
Performance figures
- Maximum speed: 67 km/h (42 mph)
- Power output: 1,100 hp (820 kW) (at wheels)
- Tractive effort: 104.71 kN (23,540 lb_{f})
Career
- Operators: Vietnam Railways; Congo–Ocean Railway; Cambodia Railways
- Class: 141 Vietnam Railways; 141 Congo–Ocean Railway; 141 Cambodia Railways
- Numbers: 141-501~141-527(SACM version); 141-A-101~141-A-110(SACM version); 141-121~141-123(Gia Lam version); 141-157~141-216(Tangshan version)
- Official name: Mikađô
- Nicknames: Tự Lực
- Retired: 1974-1975 (SCAM version); 1985-1995 (Tangshan & Gia Lam version, except 141-159, 141-160, 141-190)
- Preserved: 10 (9 in Vietnam, 1 in Cambodia)

The 141-Class Locomotive (Vietnamese: Đầu máy lớp 141 Đường sắt Việt Nam) is a powerful metre gauge steam locomotive in use on Vietnamese Railways. Mechanically they are very similar to Vietnamese 231-500 Class locomotives.

== History ==
The first variants of the 141-1 class locomotives were produced by the Société Alsacienne de Construction Mecaniques (SACM) in Mulhouse between 1947 and 1950. An order for 27 (an additional order for 17 was reduced to 8 in 1951) locomotives was placed for the French Indochinese colonies before the partition of North and South Vietnam. Both nations would continue to use the French 141-Class into the 1970s.

In 1965 the North built three domestic locomotives using disassembled French models and spare parts, numbered 141-121 (also known as the heroic Nguyen Van Troi locomotive), 141-122 (Vietnam-China), 141-123 (Socialist railway). These were dubbed the 'Tu Luc' or 'self-reliant' class. The engines were built by Gia Lam Ironworks in Hanoi. More locomotives were planned, but the escalation of the Vietnamese War forces production to move to China. The Chinese class of locomotives, the Zi Li (Unaided or self-reliant), was an almost identical copy of the French and Vietnamese locomotives, but were slightly lighter.

== Preserved examples ==
- 141-122: Gia Lam Train Company Factory
- 141-158: Saigon station
- 141-159: Di An Works
- 141-165: Di An Works
- 141-179: Hanoi Museum
- 141-182: Di An Works
- 141-190: Di An Works
- 141-202: Euro Garden Cau Dat
- 141-026: Da Nang Railway Station
- 141-551: Phnom Penh Shed
