= List of railway stations in Cambodia =

The following is a list of railway stations in Cambodia currently in operation.

== Northern line ==
- Phnom Penh (ភ្នំពេញ)
- Samrong (សំរោង)
- Batdeng (បាត់ដឹង)
- Tbeng Khpos (ត្បែងខ្ពស់)
- Mea Nork (មានក)
- Romeas (រមាស)
- Kraing Skea (ក្រាំងស្គា)
- Kdol (ក្ដុល)
- Bomnak (បំណក់)
- Kamreng (កំរែង)
- Pursat (ពោធិ៍សាត់)
- Beung Khnar (បឹងខ្នារ)
- Maung Russey (មោងឫស្សី)
- Phnom Thiphdei (ភ្នំធិបតី)
- Battambang (បាត់ដំបង)
- Thmor Kor (ថ្មគោល)
- Phnom Touch (ភ្នំតូច)
- Mongkol Borei (មង្គលបូរី)
- Sisophon (សិរីសោភ័ណ)
- Poipet (ប៉ោយប៉ែត)

== Southern line ==
- Phnom Penh (ភ្នំពេញ)
- Takéo (តាកែវ)
- Touk Meas (ទូកមាស)
- Kep (កែប)
- Kampot (កំពត)
- Veal Renh (វាលរេញ)
- Prey Nob (ព្រៃនប់)
- Sihanoukville (ព្រះសីហនុ)

== See also ==
- Rail transport in Cambodia
