= Class 141 =

Class 141 or 141 class can refer to:

- British Rail Class 141, a British diesel multiple unit
- CIÉ 141 Class, an Irish diesel locomotive
- Vietnam Railways 141 Class, a Vietnamese steam locomotive
- NBR 141 Class, a British steam locomotive
- DB Class 141, a German electric locomotive
- CZ Class 141, a Czechoslovak electric locomotive
- G&SWR 141 Class, a British steam locomotive
