= Vietnam Railways 231 Class =

Locomotive in use in Vietnam

231 Class
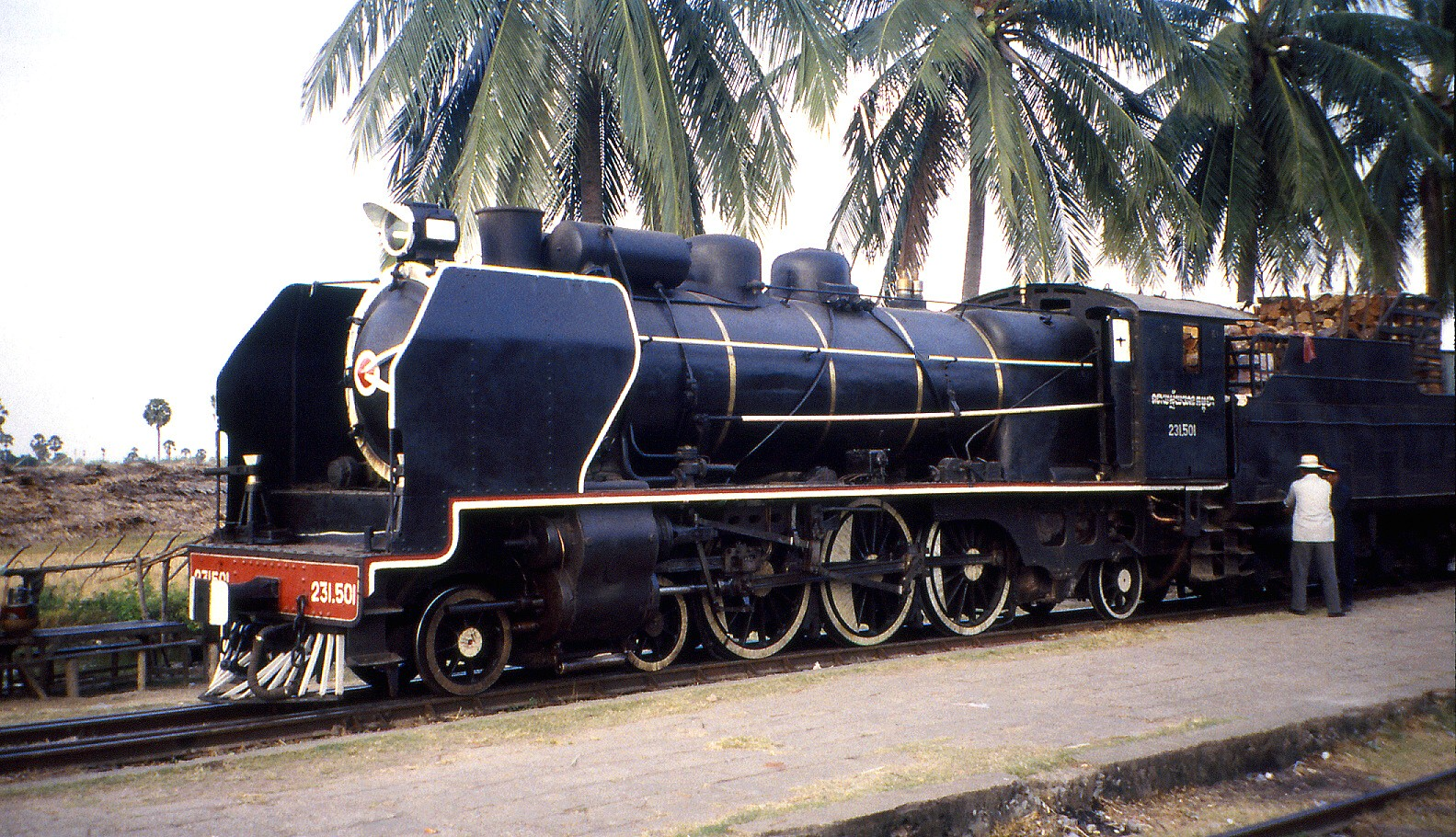
Type and origin
- Power type: Steam
- Builder: Société Alsacienne de Constructions Mécaniques (SACM)
Specifications
- Configuration
  - Whyte: 4-6-2
- Gauge: 1,000 mm (3 ft 3 3/8 in)
- Driver dia.: 1,200 mm (47.24 in)
- Cylinders: 2
Career
- Operators: Vietnam Railways, Royal Railways of Cambodia
- Preserved: 9

The 231 class locomotive is a 4-6-2 "Pacific" type metre gauge steam locomotive in use on Vietnam Railways and the Royal Railways of Cambodia.

== Preserved examples ==
- 231-501: Phnom Penh Shed
- 231-502: Phnom Penh Shed
- 231-503: Phnom Penh Shed
- 231-504: Phnom Penh Shed
- 231-505: Phnom Penh Shed
- 231-506: Battambang Depot
- 231-507: Battambang Depot
- 231-508: Phnom Penh Shed
- 231-509: Phnom Penh Shed
