= Northern Line (Cambodia) =

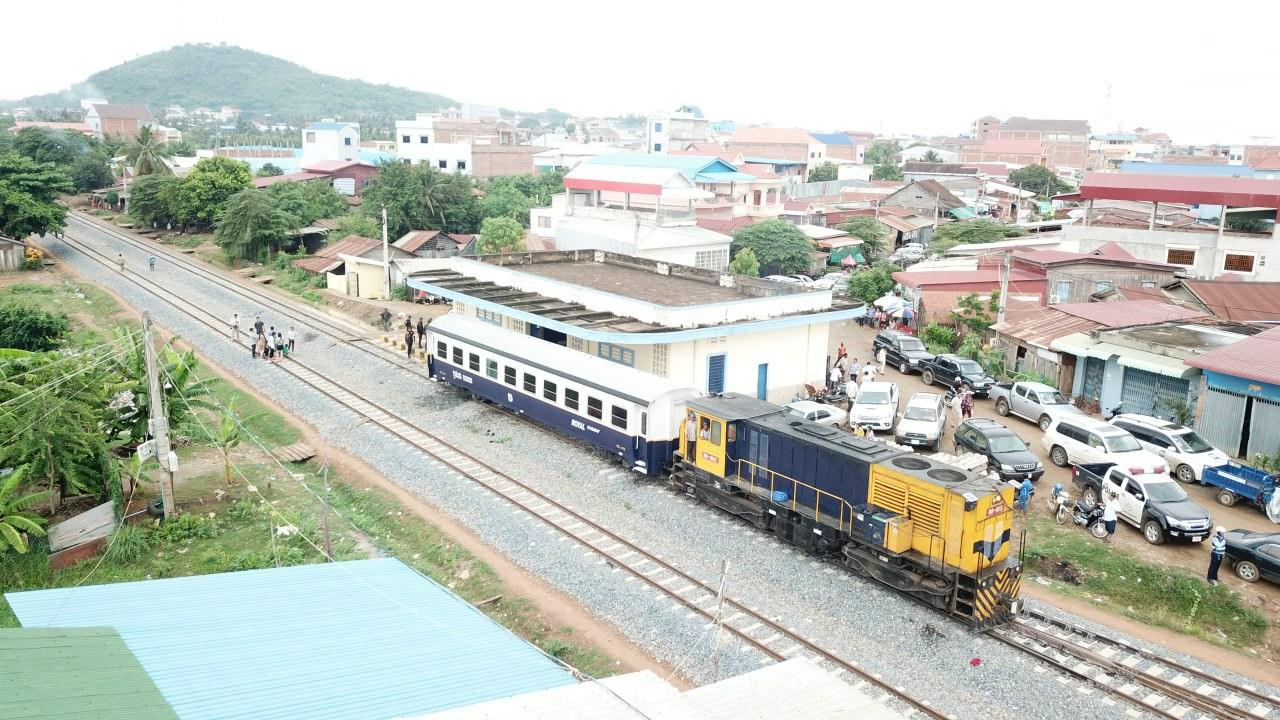

Overview
- Status: Operational
- Owner: Government of Cambodia
- Termini: Phnom Penh; Poipet

Service
- Operator(s): Royal Railway Cambodia

History
- Opened: 28 June 1932; 93 years ago
- Completed: 10 April 1942; 83 years ago

Technical
- Line length: 386 km (240 mi)
- Number of tracks: 1
- Track gauge: 1,000 mm (3 ft 3 3/8 in) metre gauge

Northern Line (Khmer: ផ្លូវដែកភាគខាងជើង) is a railway line connecting Phnom Penh and Poipet in Cambodia.

== History ==
Since the 1880s, there have been plans for a railway from Saigon to the Siamese border via Phnom Penh.

The Saigon–Phnom Penh section did not progress and the project was abandoned in 1929 due to lack of funds.

The Phnom Penh-Pursat section was opened on 28 June 1932. The Pursat-Mongkol Borei section was opened on July 1933.

The extension of the line from Mongkol Borei towards Poipet to the border progressed slowly. After the Franco-Thai War, the northwest of Cambodia was annexed by Thailand. The Aranyaprathet-Mongkol Borei section via Poipet was constructed by Imperial Japanese Army, and this section was opened on 10 April 1942.

After the Surrender of Japan, the northwest of Cambodia was reverted to French Indochina, Thailand removed the track along the border. Cambodia formally gained independence in 1949, but the railway continued to operate under French control. It was not handed over to Cambodia until 1952, when it was subsequently renamed the Chemins de Fer Royeaux du Cambodge (CRC). Thailand relocated the track removed in 1947, and from 22 April 1955, a shuttle train ran twice a week between Poipet and Aranyaprathet.

In 1961, Cambodian–Thai border dispute broke out between the two countries over the ruins of the ancient temple of Preah Vihear.

This border dispute led to another diplomatic severance between the two countries on October 23, 1961. Four days later, cross-border rail traffic was again suspended, and Thailand again removed the border tracks.

After the 1970 Cambodian coup d'état, Cambodia once again sought political rapprochement with Thailand, and train service resumed two to three times per week on 2 November 1970. However, on 2 July 1974, train service was again suspended as the Khmer Rouge tightened their grip on Cambodia.

After 1974, the Khmer Rouge removed the rail tracks on the Cambodian side of the border west of Sisophon. However, trains were operated on Phnom Penh-Sisophon section at that time.

From the 1980s to the 2000s, trains were rarely operated because of the Cambodian–Vietnamese War and the suspension of government subsidies. On some sections of the line, locals offered tourists a service called the "Norry" offering rides on small, two-axle carriages made from bamboo and powered by gasoline engines.

In 2009, the Asian Development Bank and the Cambodian government agreed to provide funding for the restoration, and construction of Northern Line began on 25 July 2014, with a groundbreaking ceremony held in Poipet.

The 48 km Poipet-Sisophon section was reopened on 4 April 2018, the 69 km Sisophon-Battambang section on April 29, the 107 km Battambang-Pursat section on May 29, and the 166 km Pursat-Phnom Penh section on July 4.

On 22 April 2019, the 1.3km section of track from Poipet to Ban Klong Luk was repaired, the line reopened for cross-border freight transport in the presence of Prime Ministers Hun Sen and Prayut Chan-o-cha of both countries.

== See also ==
- Rail transport in Cambodia
