= Southern Line (Cambodia) =

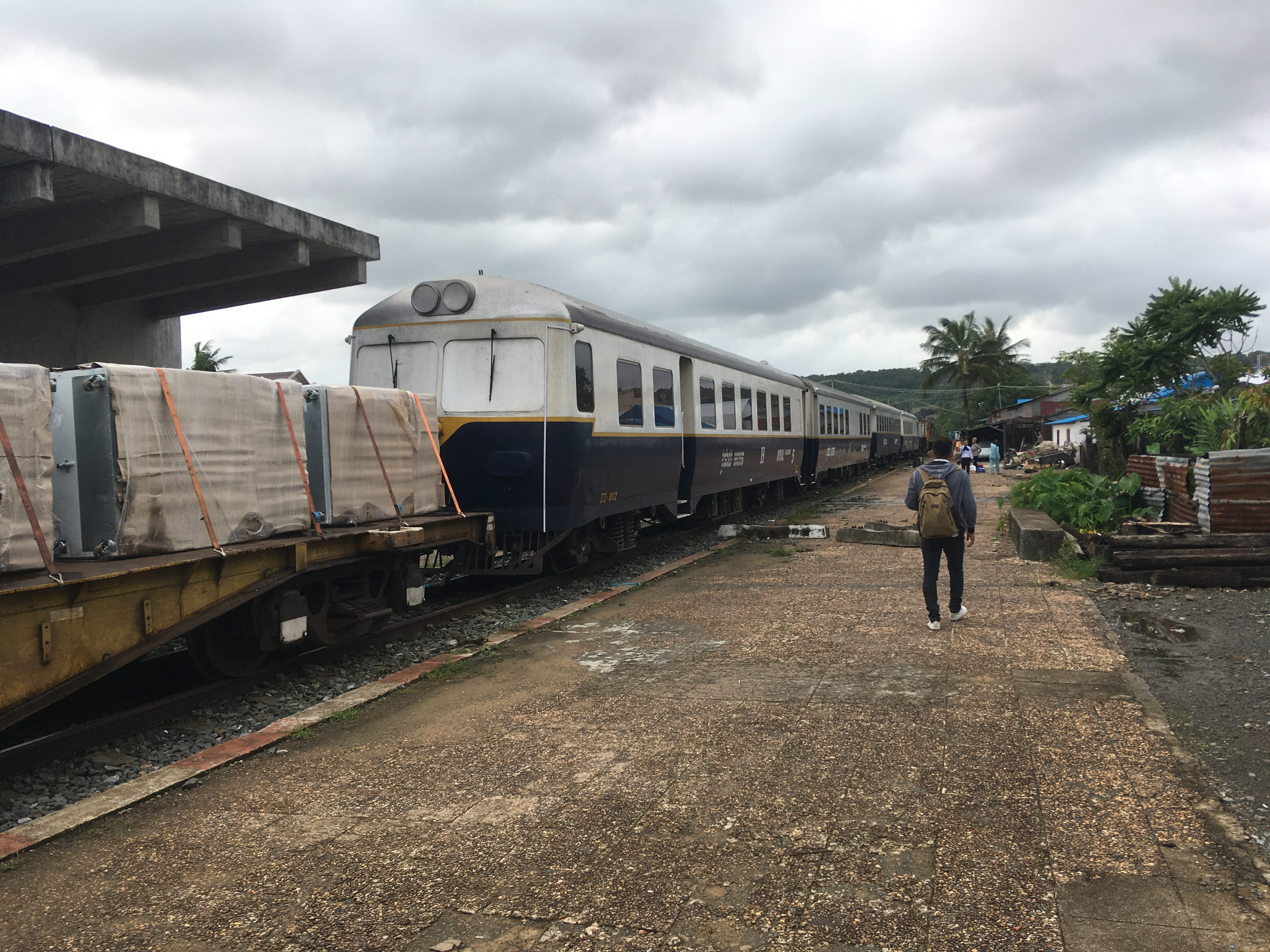

Overview
- Status: Operational
- Owner: Government of Cambodia
- Termini: Phnom Penh; Sihanoukville

Service
- Operator: Royal Railway Cambodia

History
- Opened: December 1969

Technical
- Line length: 264 km (164 mi)
- Number of tracks: 1
- Track gauge: 1,000 mm (3 ft 3 3/8 in) metre gauge

Southern Line (Khmer: ផ្លូវដែកភាគខាងត្បូង) is a railway line connecting Phnom Penh and Sihanoukville in Cambodia.

== History ==
Cambodia became independent on November 9, 1953, and French Indochina was ceased the following year. During French Indochina era, Cambodia had used ports in Vietnam, so Cambodia became necessary its own port after the independence. The port of Kompong Som (since 1959: Sihanoukville) on the Gulf of Thailand was expanded and opened in April 1960.

In addition to road transport, railways was also needed. In cooperation with France, West Germany, and the People's Republic of China, the railway project between Phnom Penh and Sihanoukville began in 1960. The single-track line was put into operation in December 1969.

Under the Khmer Rouge regime, Cambodia's railway services were suspended and the railway infrastructure was damaged and destroyed. After the Khmer Rouge were ousted in 1979, restoration of the Southern Line began in the 1980s.

After the restoration, only freight trains ran on the line, if at all. Since April 2014, the Royal Railway has resumed passenger service on the Southern Line.

== See also ==
- Rail transport in Cambodia
