= Royal Railway Cambodia =

Royal Railway Cambodia ផ្លូវដែករាជវង្សកម្ពុជា
Overview
- Locale: Cambodia
- Dates of operation: 2009–present

Technical
- Track gauge: 1,000 mm (3 ft 3 3/8 in) meter gauge
- Length: 612 km (380 mi)

Other
- Website: Official website

Royal Railway Cambodia is a railway operator in Cambodia.

It is a subsidiary of the Cambodian conglomerate the Royal Group.

== History ==
The history of railways in Cambodia began during the French Indochina period.

The railway network suffered severe damage during the Cambodian Civil War that began in the 1970s and the Khmer Rouge regime. Tracks and bridges were bombed repeatedly, destroying many rail cars. After the collapse of the Khmer Rouge regime in 1979, service resumed on a patchy basis with limited equipment, but lack of maintenance and deterioration of the facilities continued. In the 2000s, derailments became frequent, significantly reducing transport capacity for both passengers and freight, resulting in the complete cessation of service on the entire line by 2009.

In the late 2000s, a large-scale restoration project was launched with support from the Asian Development Bank, the Australian government and others. In June 2009, Australian business Toll Group was awarded the contract to begin reconstruction of Cambodia's rail network and to operate it once complete.

It was initially launched as a joint venture between Cambodia's Royal Group and Australia's Toll under a concession system, but Toll withdrew in 2014 and the project has since been operated solely by the Royal Group.

== Railway Lines ==
- Northern Line
- Southern Line

== Rolling stock ==
- KiHa 183 series
- DMU AS1000
- CKD6D
- YDM-4

== Future ==
The Cambodian government is planning a fundamental modernization of its railway network based on the Comprehensive Master Plan on Cambodia Intermodal Transport and Logistics System 2023-2033.
