= Sihanoukville railway station =

Railway station in Cambodia

Sihanoukville ក្រុងព្រះសីហនុ
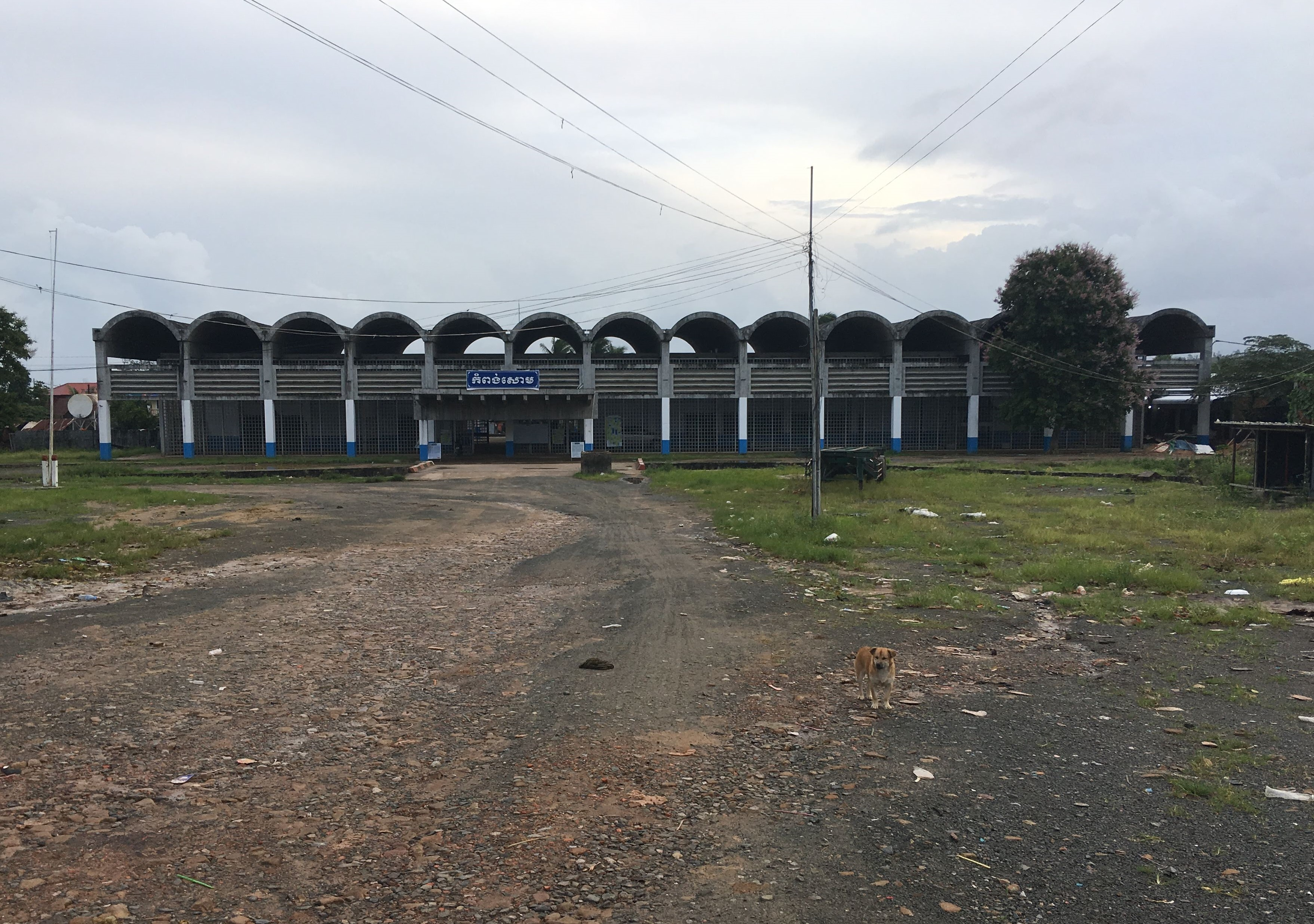

General information
- Location: Sihanoukville, Preah Sihanouk province Cambodia
- Coordinates: 10°38′37″N 103°30′55″E
- Operator: Royal Railways of Cambodia
- Line: Phnom Penh–Sihanoukville Line

Construction
- Structure type: At-grade

History
- Opened: 1969; 57 years ago

Services
Preceding station	Royal Railways	Following station
Terminus	Southern Line	Prey Nob towards Phnom Penh
Location

Sihanoukville railway station is a railway station in Sihanoukville, Preah Sihanouk province, Cambodia. It is the railway terminus of the Phnom Penh–Sihanoukville railway. The station is located near the Sihanoukville Autonomous Port.

== History ==
The Phnom Penh–Sihanoukville railway was opened in December 1969.

Under the Khmer Rouge regime, the line was damaged and destroyed. After the Khmer Rouge were ousted in 1979, restoration of the line began in the 1980s.

After the restoration, only freight trains ran on the line. Since April 2014, passenger service was resumed on the line.
