= Rail transport in Cambodia =

Railway transport in Cambodia
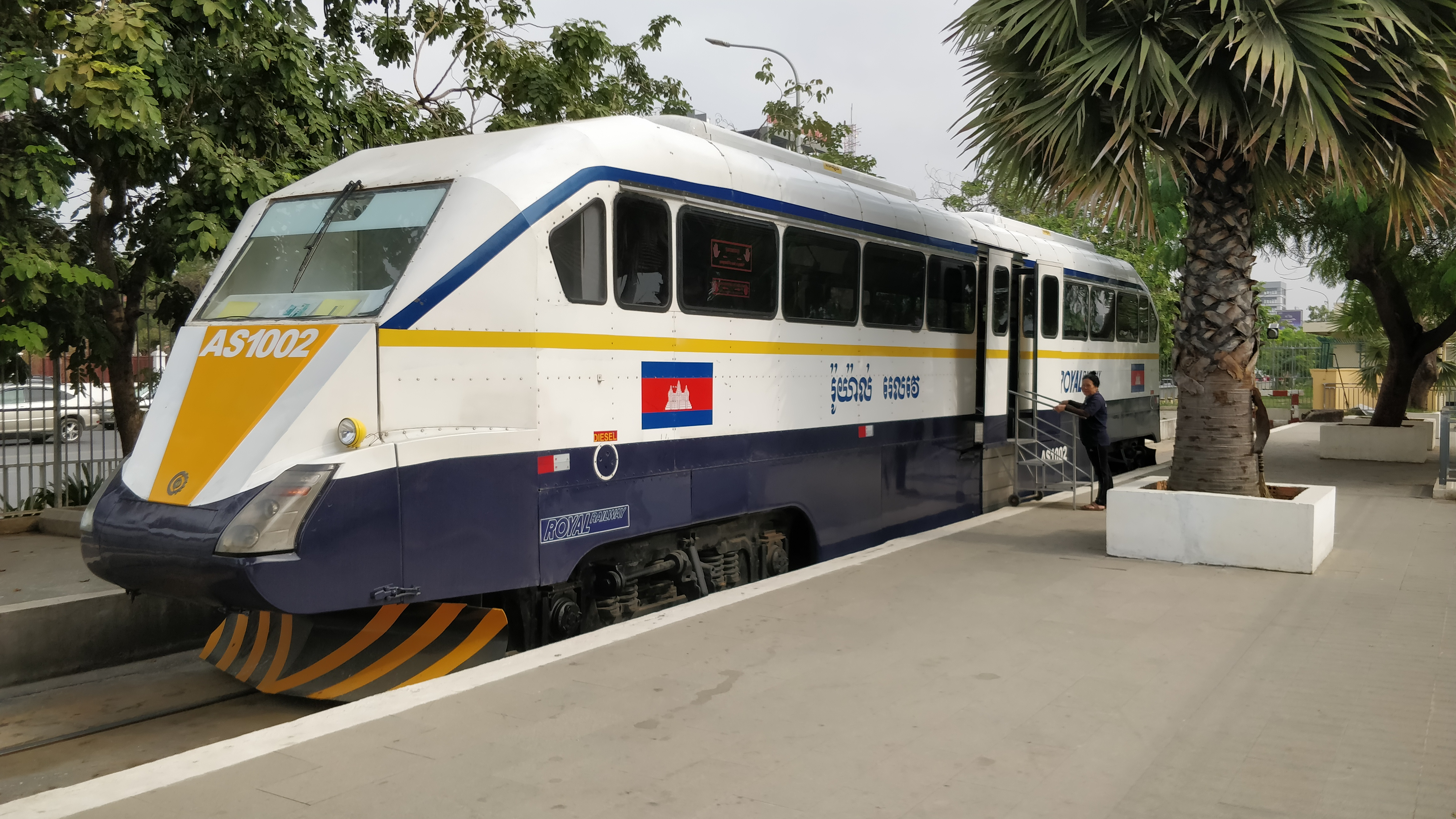
- Phnom Penh International Airport shuttle train

Operation
- National railway: Royal Railway

System length
- Total: 612 kilometres (380 mi)

Track gauge
- Main: 1,000 mm (3 ft 3 3/8 in)

Features
Map

Cambodia has 612 km (380 mi) of 1,000 mm (3 ft 3 3/8 in) metre gauge rail network, consisting of two lines: one from the capital, Phnom Penh, to Sihanoukville, and another from Phnom Penh to Poipet, on the Thai border. The lines were originally constructed during the time when the country was part of French Indochina, but due to neglect and damage from civil war during the latter half of the 20th century, the railways were in a dilapidated state, and all services had been suspended by 2009. Through rehabilitation efforts by the government of Cambodia, with funding from the Asian Development Bank, Australian Agency for International Development (AusAID), and the Australian company Toll Holdings, freight and limited passenger service returned between Phnom Penh and Sihanoukville by 2016, and passenger service between Phnom Penh and Poipet was fully restored in 2019.

== History ==
=== French colonial era ===
Before the Phnom Penh–Poipet railway was built in the 1930s, a 600 mm (1 ft 11 5/8 in) railway line connecting Phnom Krom with Siem Reap was originally built by the French in the 1890s. The French colonial government built the first line, running from Phnom Penh to Poipet on the Thai border, between 1930 and 1940, with Phnom Penh Railway Station opening in 1932. The final connection with Thailand was completed by Royal State Railways in 1942. However, the service from Bangkok to Battambang was suspended when the French Indochinese Government resumed sovereignty over Battambang and the Sisophon area from Thailand on 17 December 1946, as Thailand was seen as a supporter of Khmer Issarak, the anti-French, Khmer nationalist political movement.

Route

Phnom Penh – Pursat – Moung Ruessei – Battambang – Sisophon – Poipet

=== Late 20th century ===
In 1955 Australia donated rolling stock, described as "railway wagons of various types", worth at the time AUS£441,000 and "needed for new rail links." Assistance from France, West Germany, and the United Kingdom between 1960 and 1969 supported the construction of the Southern Line, which runs from Phnom Penh to Sihanoukville on the southern coast to cut down the reliance on Saigon Port of Vietnam and Khlong Toei Port of Thailand. In 1960, Australia provided four third-class passenger carriages under the Colombo Plan. Rail service ceased during the war but resumed in the early 1980s. Guerrilla activities, however, continued to disrupt service.

=== 21st century ===
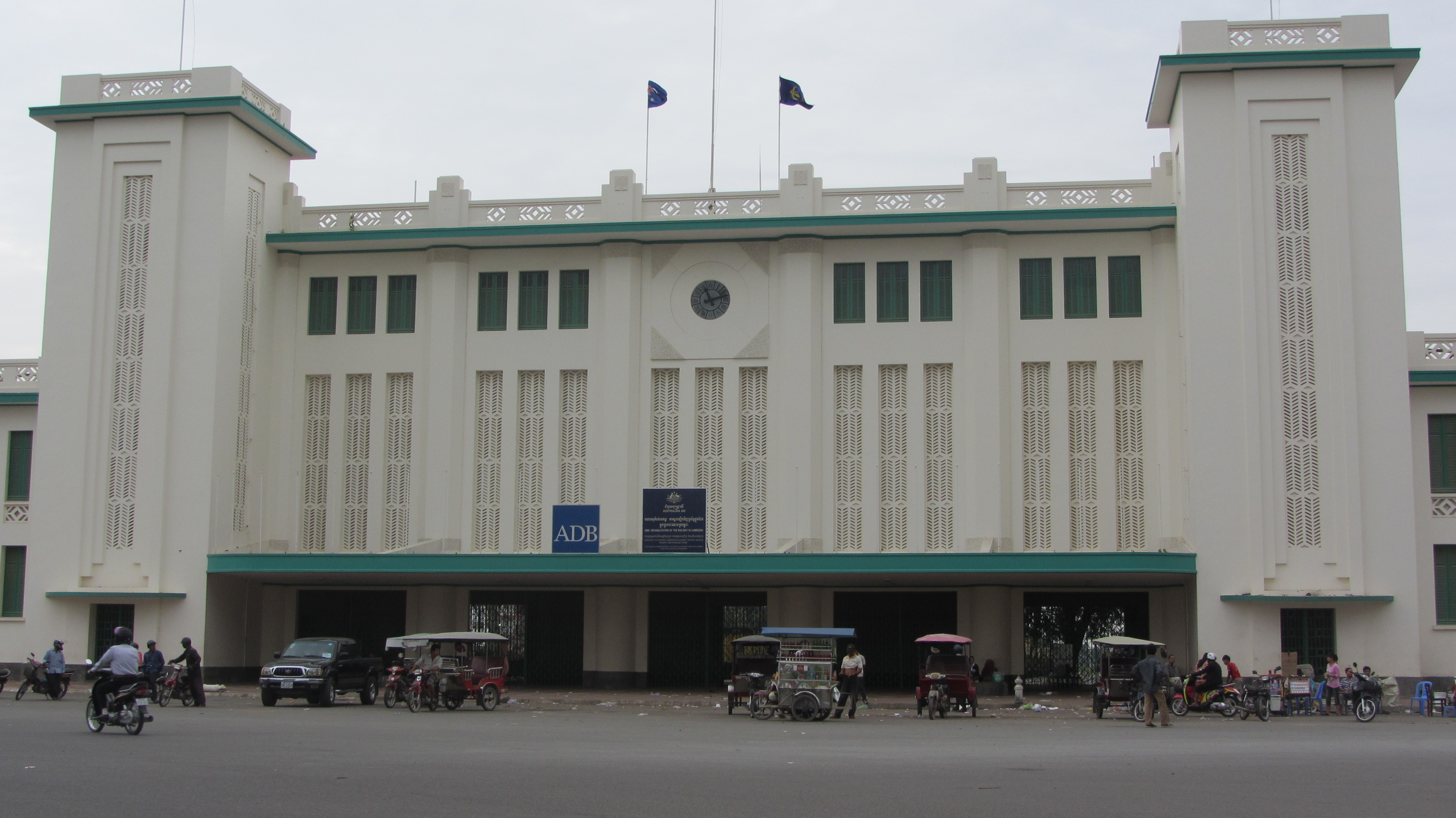
Railway Station – Phnom Penh 2012

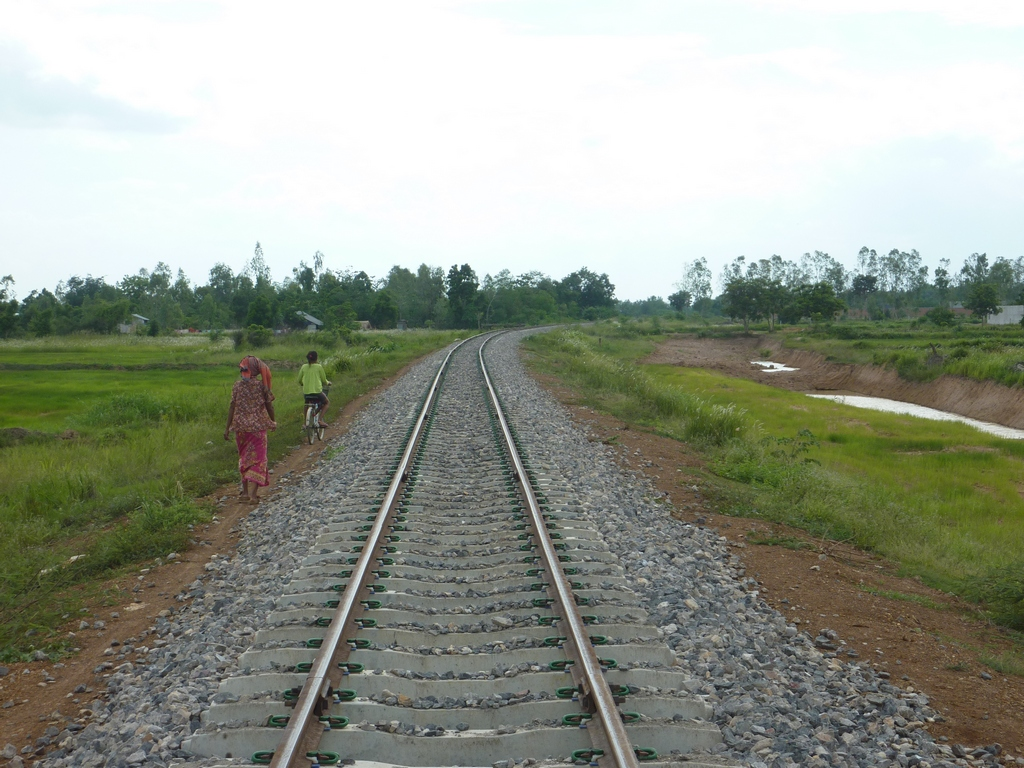
Rehabilitation of Poipet-Sisophon railway, as seen in 2012

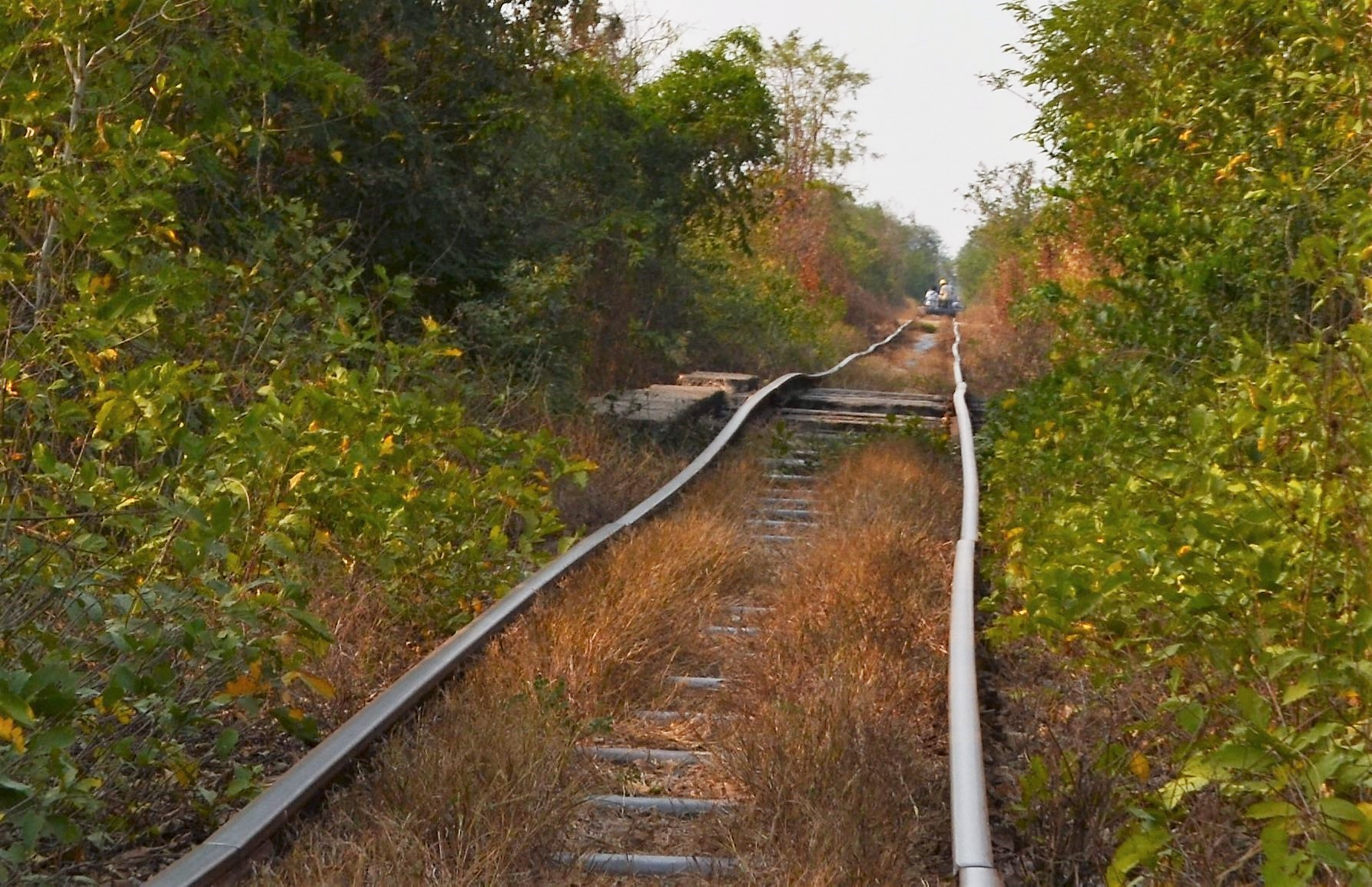
Railways near Battambang (still used by the bamboo trains)

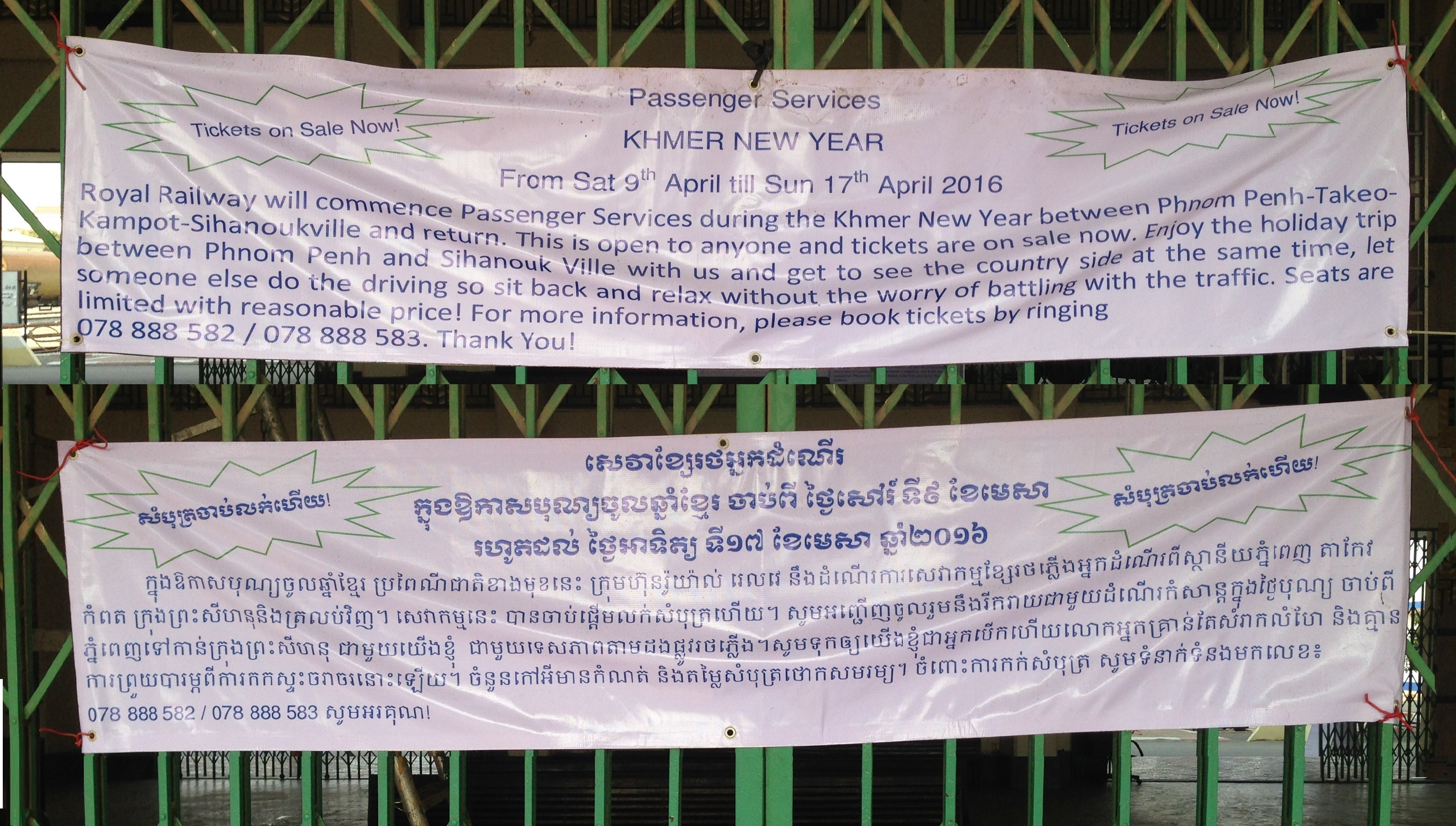
Opening in April 2016

By 2008 the service between Phnom Penh and Battambang had been reduced from daily to weekly service due to the lack of funds to maintain the tracks and rolling stock. Even the new diesel-electric locomotives from China could not run on the tracks due to the dilapidated condition. Derailing of trains in operation was not infrequent. As reported by the Phnom Penh Post in October 2008, the national railway earned merely $2 million per year; the annual freight amount stood at 350,000, and the passenger count at 500,000. The last regular rail service in Cambodia between Phnom Penh and Battambang was suspended entirely in early 2009.

In June 2009, Australian business Toll Holdings was awarded the contract to begin reconstruction of Cambodia's rail network and to operate it once complete. It is envisioned that this line would reopen by mid-2013, together with the track further west to the Thai border, allowing for direct rail services into Cambodia from Bangkok for the first time in over 60 years. The Australian government and the Asian Development Bank was said to spend $26 million to help rebuild Cambodia's rail system, the majority of the Northern and Southern lines in Cambodia. The project, if all up, would cost $143 million, with the disruption exposed in a report by the international consortium funding the $143 million project – Australia's international aid agency AusAID and the Asian Development Bank. 641 kilometers of track will be rehabilitated with the aim of integrating Cambodia with the regional network such as Vietnam and Thailand; however, about 1,400 families who are living in shanty towns, have been affected and 1050 families have had to move. The report which was prepared by AusAID and Asian Development Bank experts in April 2012 pointed out poor construction and botched surveys leading to evictions of families, infighting between contractors, delays and cost overruns.

In March 2012, Toll said that it would suspend its involvement in the railway project due to delays, caused by lack of equipment, 2011's flood rains, and the resettlement of thousands of Cambodians. The line from Phnom Penh to the deep water port at Sihanoukville was also scheduled to be reopened in 2011. However, the company came back in late July and said it will start transporting construction materials needed to build the southern line from 1 August. Toll Holdings sold its 55% stake in 2014 to Royal Group, with the company renamed Royal Railway Cambodia.

In June 2012, Cambodia discussed with China on funding for a 250-kilometre stretch of rail line between Cambodia and Vietnam. Var Sim Sorya, director general of Ministry of Public Works and Transportation said: "China doesn’t have so many conditions, but Chinese technicians are still well-studied," he said yesterday at a workshop on infrastructure, although he did not specify which conditions were undesirable. In 2013, China Railway Group planned to build a 405 km (252 mi) north–south railway across Cambodia, which would support planned expansion of the steel industry in Cambodia.

The line between Phnom Penh and Sihanoukville opened to travellers on 9 April 2016, after having been suspended for 14 years. The line between the Thai border at Poipet and Battambang was under reconstruction as of 2017, with the remainder of the line between Battambang and Phnom Penh planned to be reconstructed at a cost of $150 million.

It was announced in March 2018 that the line from Poipet to Sisophon would begin operations on 4 April 2018. Subsequently, operations were further extended to Battambang on 29 April, with plans to open the line to Pursat on 29 May. It was also reported that new railway routes were being studied by private companies. In 2020, transport undersecretary of state Ly Borin announced a feasibility study of the railway from Phnom Penh to Bavet at the Vietnamese border, with an eventual plan to connect to the Vietnamese railway network at Ho Chi Minh City.

In May 2019, by request of the Prime Minister, Hun Sen, a team from China Railway Construction Corporation arrived in Cambodia to conduct feasibility studies on railway upgrades, including bridge and track repairs, double tracking, electrification, Phnom Penh–Stung Treng–Siem Reap railway and urban rail system (light rail and metro) in Phnom Penh.

On 30 January 2023, the Cambodian government announced plans to build three high-speed rail lines connecting Phnom Penh to the country's borders to promote a more diversified transportation sector, according to the Ministry of Public Works and Transport.

In July 2023, the commissioning of a new link between Cambodia and Thailand was announced. Transport experts hail the recent railway link between Cambodia and Thailand as a significant development that will boost travel, tourism and freight transport, benefiting both countries’ economies.

Sin Chanthy, president of the Cambodia Logistics Association (CLA), announced the news of the formal connectivity on 26 July, highlighting its potential as a vital logistics transport line for ASEAN and China.

Planned High Speed Rail by the Cambodian Government, 2023

The 3 railways are:

- Phnom Penh–Sihanoukville railway using the existing Phnom Penh-Poipet-Banteay Meanchey railway;
- Phnom Penh–Poipet high-speed railway is estimated at $4 billion and the China Road and Bridge Corporation (CRBC) is given the rights to conduct a feasibility study on the project. The project will take about four years to build;
- Phnom Penh–Bavet City high speed railway is also in its plan to be built.

== Statistics ==
=== Historical ===
Royal Cambodian Railways

- Date: c. 1956
- Route: Connections with railways in Thailand and Vietnam
- Gauge: 1,000 mm (3 ft 3 3/8 in)
- Route length: 389 kilometres (242 mi)
- Locomotives: 23 – it appears that 19 of these still exist and one (RRC No. 231-501 4-6-2) is operational

== Rolling stock ==
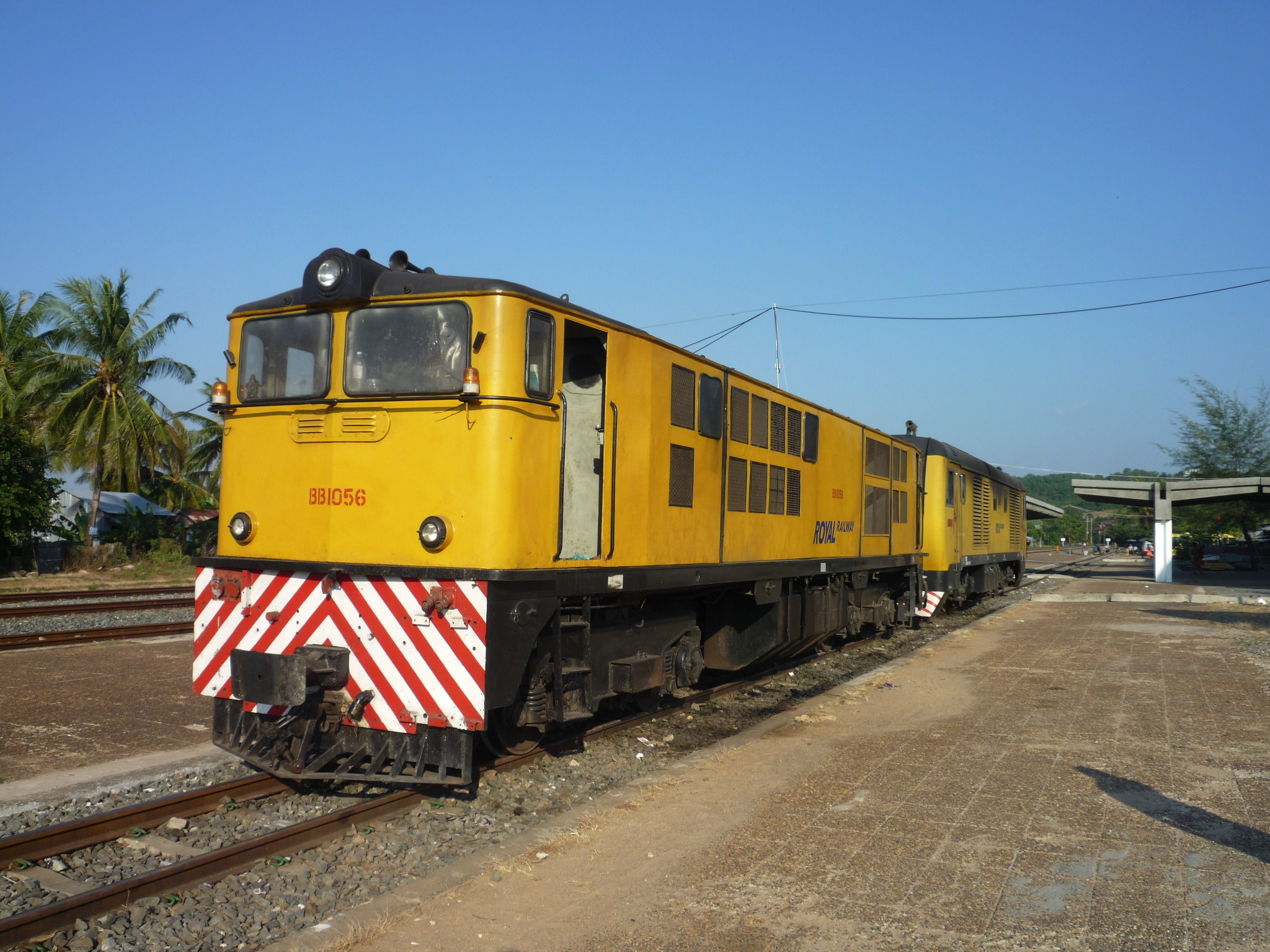
Diesel locomotives in Cambodia

CSR Qishuyan Locomotive Company of China has supplied diesel-electric locomotives of type CKD6D to Cambodia Royal Railway. These are 880 kW (1,180 hp) Bo-Bo locomotives with Caterpillar CAT3508B diesel engines. Ten second hand Indian YDM4 locomotives are also present in the fleet.

As of 2023, Cambodian Railways also operate a fleet of ex-Thai Railways DMU trainsets.

Most recently, Cambodian Railways purchased 11 units of KiHa 183 series DMUs from Japan Railways Group.

== Railway links with adjacent countries ==
- Thailand – yes – same gauge 1,000 mm (3 ft 3 3/8 in)
- Laos – indirectly via Thailand 1,000 mm (3 ft 3 3/8 in)
- Vietnam – no – planned – same gauge 1,000 mm (3 ft 3 3/8 in)

== Timeline ==
=== 2006 ===
- Trans-Asian Railway network planned.
- Link proposed Aranyaprathet, Thailand to Sisophon, Cambodia
- Malaysia offer to donate rails and sleepers to Cambodia, to help them complete the missing links, which would be of value to all countries in the vicinity.
- 17 November 2006 – To complete a missing link in the Singapore-Kunming rail route, Malaysia has donated rails to Cambodia which will be used to connect Poipet to Sisophon (48 km). According to Transport Minister Datuk Seri Chan Kong Choy, the rail was lifted from the old Rawang-Ipoh section where a new electrified double line has been built. A link between Cambodia and Vietnam including a crossing of the Mekong River is still required. The completed Singapore-Kunming line is expected to promote increased trade with China.
- 16 December 2006 – The Asian Development Bank is advancing a loan together with the donation in kind of rails from Malaysia will see restoration of the link with Thailand.

=== 2007 ===
- ADB and OPEC agree to lend $80m for (Thailand) Aranyaprathet to (Cambodia) Sisophon link with completion in 2010.
- $500m is needed for another 254 km link from (Cambodia) Phnom Penh to (Vietnam) Lộc Ninh.

=== 2008 ===
- November 2008 – agreement for Vietnam – Cambodia link
- October–November: A 30-year agreement is prepared with Australia's Toll Holdings to upgrade the national railway system, restore the link from the present western railhead at Sisophon to the Thai railhead at Poipet, and to construct a new 225-km line linking Cambodian railways to the Vietnamese railhead of Lộc Ninh. The renovation of the existing lines, to be carried out in 50 km segments, is expected to take 2–3 years. The link to Vietnam would involve construction of two major bridges: one across the Tonlé Sap River, and another across the Mekong River in Kampong Cham Province. The Cambodian government is hoping to get assistance from China to finance the project.

=== 2009 ===
- 12 June Toll Holdings and Royal Group sign concession agreement.

=== 2010 ===
- October Touk Meas to Phnom Penh reopens for freight.

=== 2012 ===
- March Toll Holdings publicly announced that it would suspend its work for a year due to refurbishment delays.
- 1 August the company started transporting construction materials to build the Southern line.

=== 2014 ===
- 25 July a ground-breaking ceremony was held in Poipet as work to reinstate the cross-border railway to Thailand was begun.

=== 2015 ===
- August work is expected to begin on rehabilitation of the line between Phnom Penh and Sisophon.

=== 2016 ===
- 9 April – Opening to travellers of the line Phnom Penh and the South (Sihanoukville, Kampot).

=== 2018 ===
- 4 April – Opening of the line between Poipet and Sisophon
- 29 April – Extension of service from Sisophon to Battambang
- 29 May – Extension of service from Battambang to Pursat
- 4 July – Extension of service from Pursat to Phnom Penh

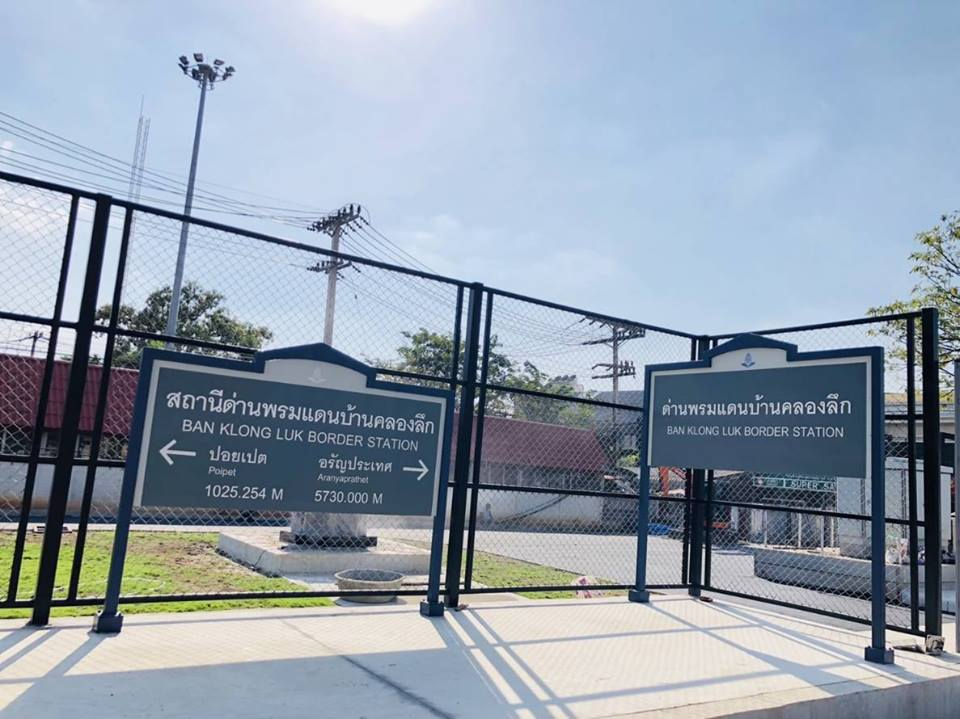
Ban Klong Luk Border railway station (2019)

=== 2019 ===
- 22 April – Resumption of cross-border rail service between Poipet and Aranyaprathet. However, only freight traffic.

=== 2020 ===
- (unknown) – Indefinite suspension of cross-border rail service at Poipet, due to COVID-19.
- (unknown) – Permanent closure of Airport rail shuttle.
- (October) – Feasibility study underway for railway between Phnom Penh and Bavet.

=== 2023 ===
- 26 July: Inaugural cross-border rail service between Thailand and Cambodia for freight
- 8 August: Cambodia, Thailand on track with new railway connectivity

== Bamboo railway ==
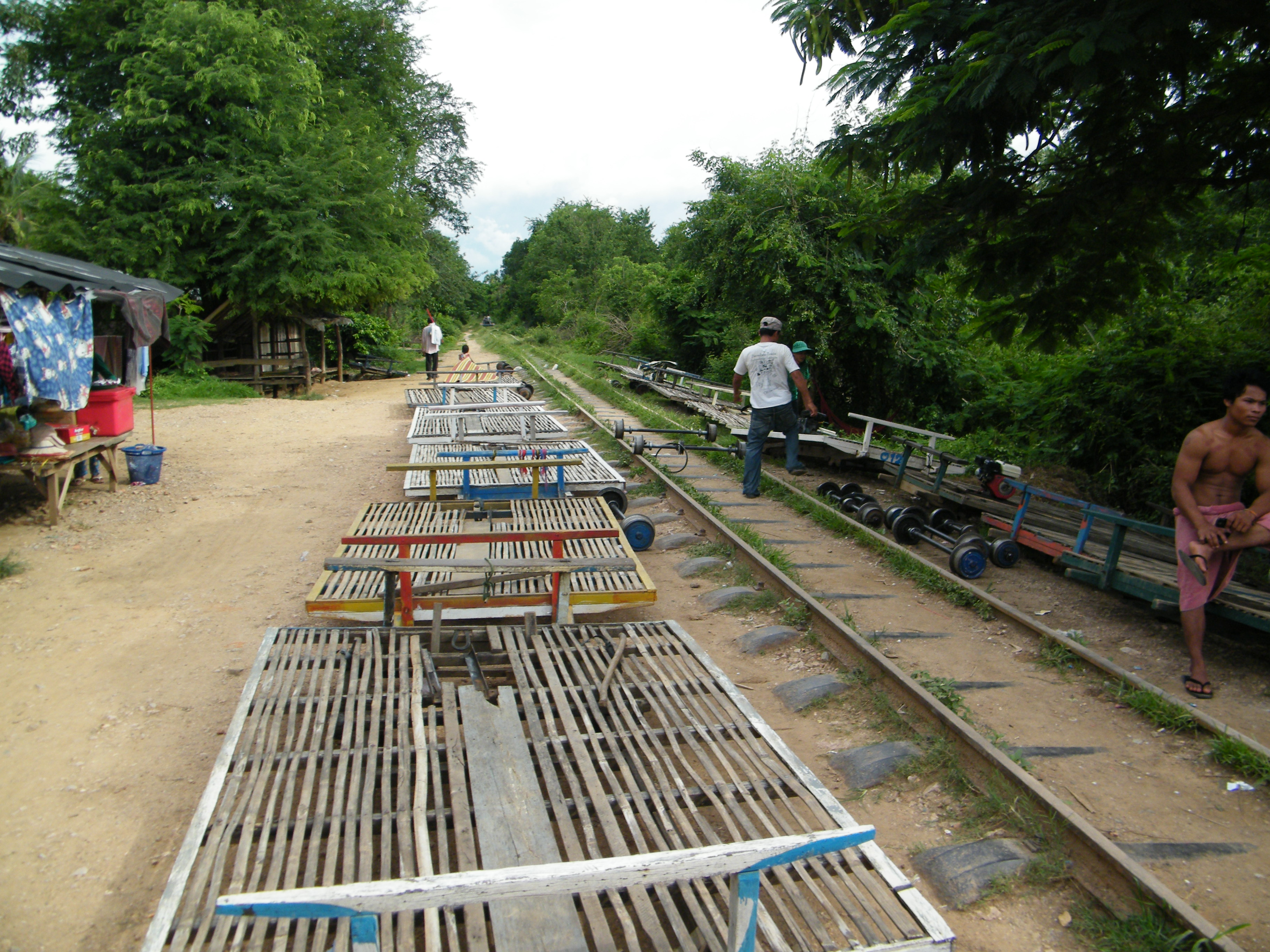
Bamboo train (Norry) station near Battambang

The "Bamboo railway", as it is known to overseas visitors, "norry" or "lorries" as it is known to locals, was a popular form of transport in the northwestern area of the country, near Battambang. The trains consist of a bamboo-covered platform and two detached axles with wheels. They run on regular tracks and are powered with scavenged engines, such as Briggs & Stratton type air-cooled gasoline engines adapted from portable electricity generators, or from water pumps Power is transmitted by belt and pulley. Trains can reach up to 40 km/h. When meeting traffic in the opposite direction, passengers of the cart with fewer passengers are expected to lift the platform, engine, and axles of their cart off the tracks to let the other cart pass.

== See also ==
- List of railway stations in Cambodia
- Phnom Krom railway
- Transport in Cambodia
