= Phnom Penh railway station =

Railway station in Cambodia

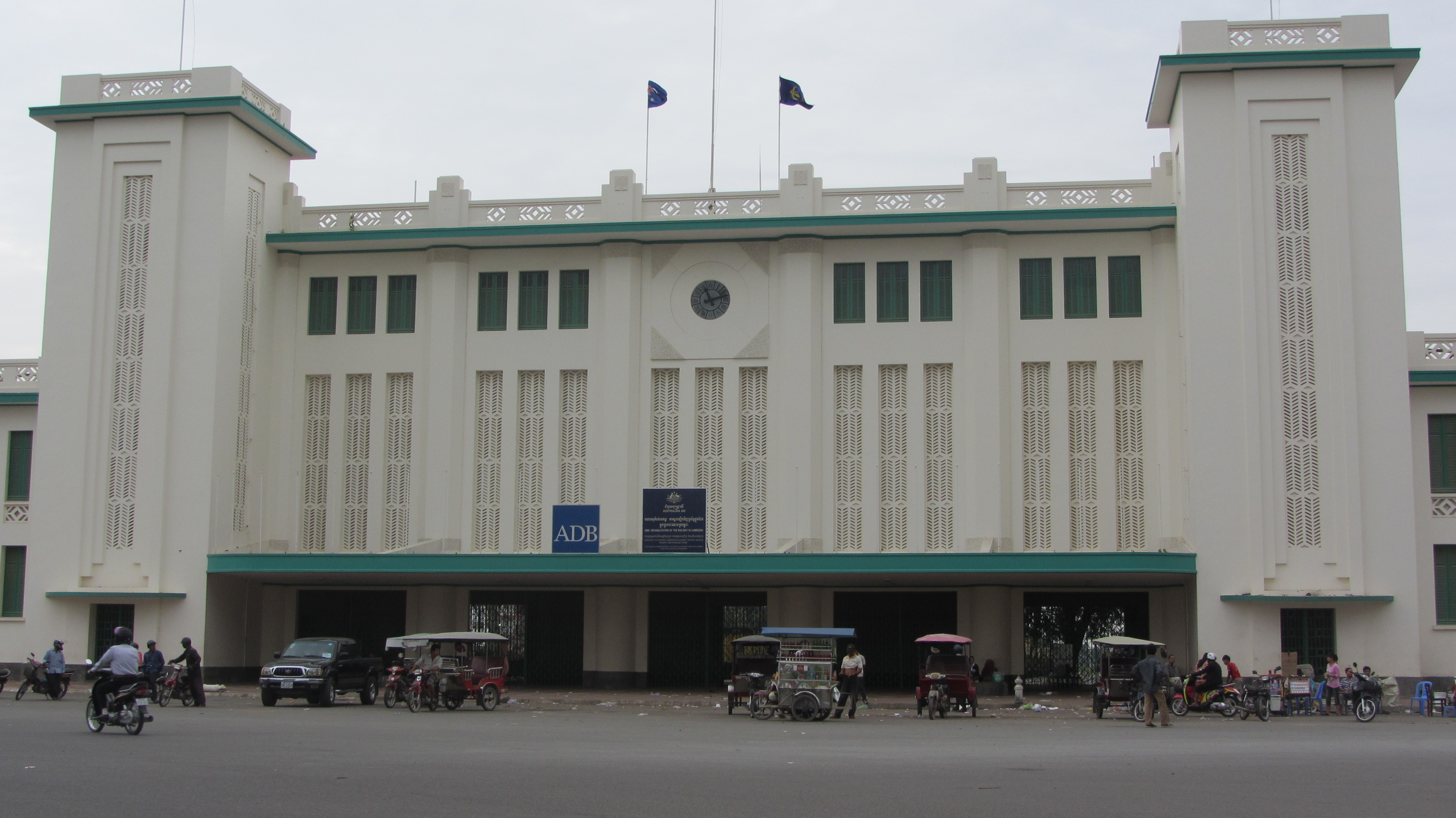
- Phnom Penh railway station Refurbished 2012

General information
- Location: Phnom Penh, Cambodia.
- Coordinates: 11°34′21″N 104°55′00″E
- Lines: Phnom Penh–Poipet Line; Phnom Penh–Sihanoukville Line
- Platforms: 2

Construction
- Parking: Available

History
- Opened: 1932; 94 years ago
- Rebuilt: 2010; 16 years ago (Renovation)

Services
Preceding station	Royal Railways	Following station
Samrong towards Poipet	Northern Line	Terminus
Samrong towards Sihanoukville	Southern Line	Terminus
Location

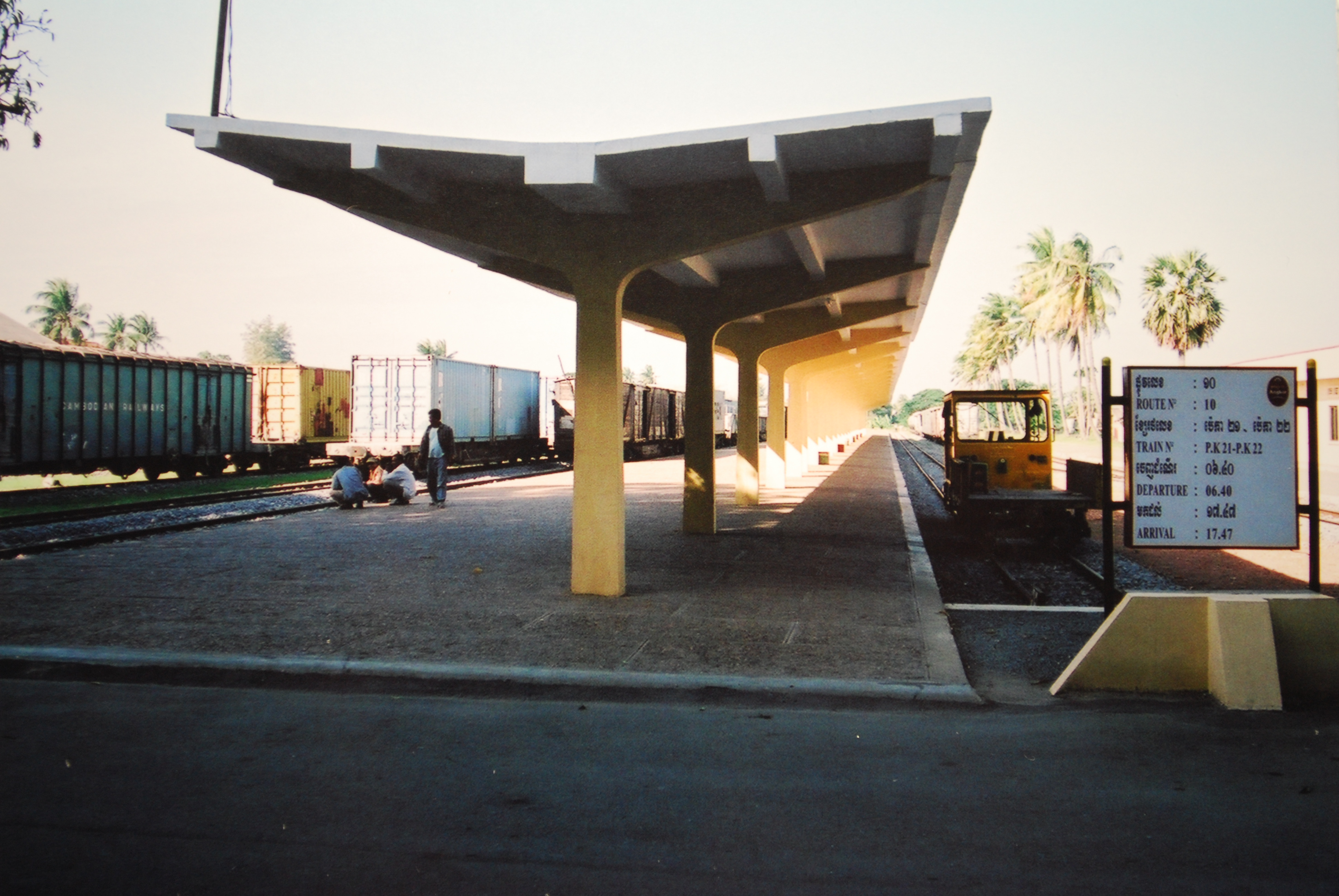
Railway platform before renovation in 2004

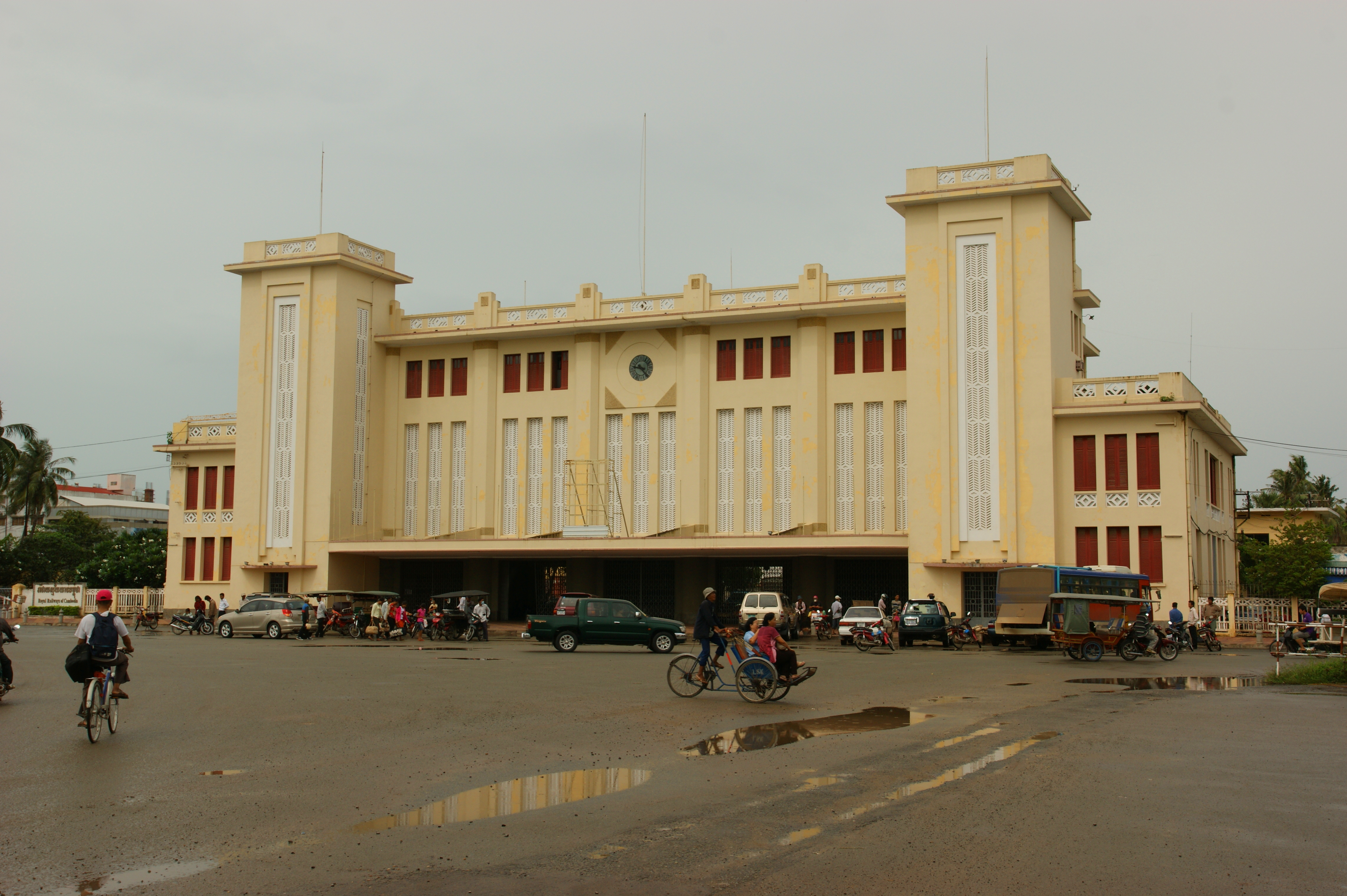
The railway station during a rainy day

Phnom Penh railway station (Khmer: ស្ថានីយ៍រថភ្លើងភ្នំពេញ) is a railway station in Phnom Penh, Cambodia. It is located next to the University of Health Sciences and the National University of Management as well as the Canadian embassy. This station was renovated and formally reopened October 22, 2010.

Scheduled passenger train services between Phnom Penh and Sihanoukville resumed in May 2016 after having been suspended for 14 years. After that, many passenger train service continue to resume. As of May 2021, there is scheduled train service between Phnom Penh to Krong Pursat, Krong Battambang, Krong Sisophon, and Poipet. There will be a passenger train service from Phnom Penh to Bangkok by 2022.

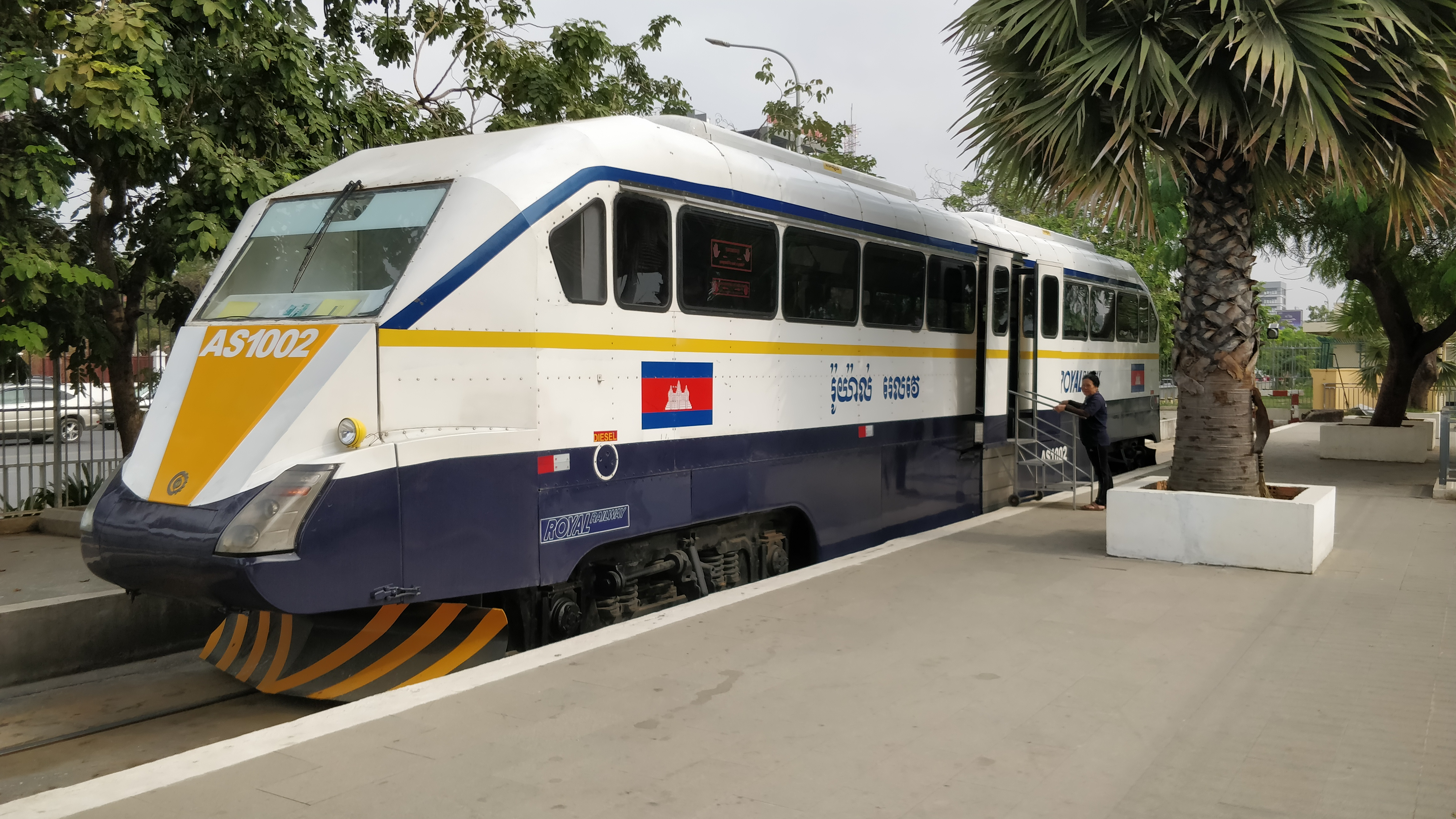
Phnom Penh Airport shuttle train

From April 2018 until 2020, trains operated by Royal Railway began running express from Phnom Penh International Airport to Phnom Penh railway station. As of 2019, Royal Railway runs 44 trains each day, and 15–16 freight trains to Sihanoukville and Poipet.

== Construction ==
The process of building the station was hampered by the rainy season. "A considerable advance was thus taken during the first year and, in 1931, the Company concentrated all her effort on the one hand on the Phnom Penh train station, including embankments, buildings and facilities, which are of an exceptional importance, and secondly on ballast supplies. Meanwhile, nature, so often hostile in Cambodia, became the main auxiliary against the engineers by packing embankments and consolidating them with vegetation. Good weather having returned, work actively resumed with the rehabilitation of the embankments and the levelling of the platform."

The station was built in 1932 from reinforced concrete to service the railway to Battambang.

== History ==
Between September 28–30, 1960, twenty-one leaders of the Kampuchean People's Revolutionary Party (KPRP) held a secret congress at the station. The meeting resulted in the party being renamed as the Workers Party of Kampuchea (WPK). In Democratic Kampuchea, this pivotal meeting would later be projected as the founding date of the party. The first important meeting of the Khmer Rouge leadership including Pol Pot was held at the railway station in April 1975, following the fall of Phnom Penh at which the decision to evacuate the cities was taken.

== See also ==
- Rail transport in Cambodia

== Notes ==
- Osborne, Milton E. (2008). Phnom Penh: a cultural and literary history. Signal Books. ISBN 978-1-904955-40-5.
