= NBR Class M =

NBR Class M may refer to:

- NBR Class M 4-4-0, a class of steam locomotive of the North British Railway
- NBR Class M 4-4-2T, a locomotive designed by William P. Reid
