= PKP class EP02 =

EP02
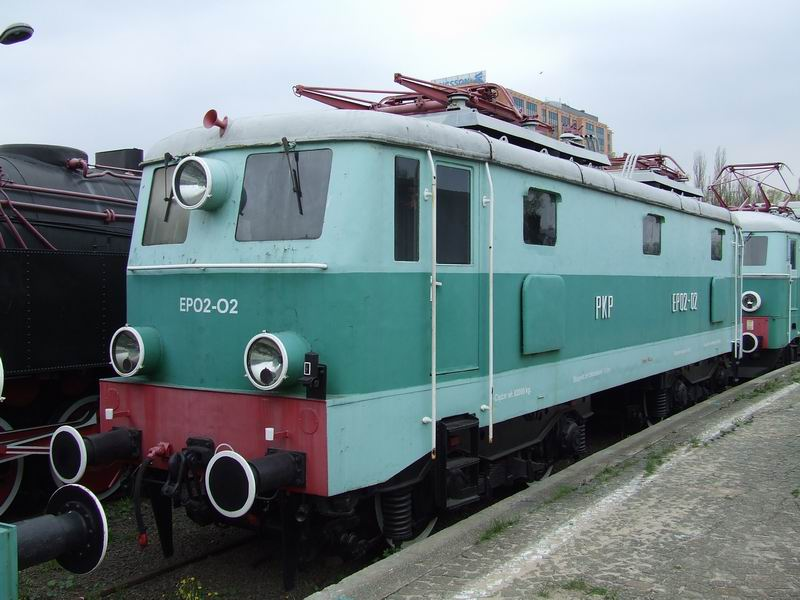
- EP02 locomotive
Type and origin
- Power type: Electric
- Builder: Pafawag
- Build date: 1953-1954; 1957
- Total produced: 8
Specifications
- Configuration
  - UIC: Bo′Bo′
- Gauge: 1,435 mm (4 ft 8 1/2 in) standard gauge
- Driver dia.: 1,100 mm (43.31 in)
- Length: 15,000 mm (49 ft 2 1/2 in)
- Width: 3,070 mm (10 ft 7/8 in)
- Height: 5,411 mm (17 ft 9 in)
- Loco weight: 81 t (80 long tons; 89 short tons)
- Fuel capacity: 2,840 L (620 imp gal; 750 US gal)
- Electric system/s: 3000 V DC Catenary
- Current pickup: Pantograph
- Engine type: MV-185R; LKa-635
- Transmission: 69:22; 78:31
- Loco brake: Knorr
- Train brakes: Air
Performance figures
- Maximum speed: 100 km/h (62 mph)
- Power output: 1,650 kW (2,210 hp); 1,600 kW (2,100 hp)
- Tractive effort: 228 kN (51,000 lb_{f})
Career
- Operators: PKP
- Class: EP02
- Locale: Poland

EP02 (also manufactured as Pafawag 1E) is a name for a Polish electric locomotive. It was made for passenger transport purposes.

== Technical features ==
Improvements were brought in with this locomotive type. The front and back of the box had dragging and bumping devices installed. The whole body was given a more aerodynamic shape compared to previous models. This machine is of Bo′Bo′ type, meaning that each axle is powered separately. The axles are installed in pairs on two bogies. The bogies had lighter, welded construction which gave the whole vehicle better contact with the rails.

The engines used in EP02 were not modern ones, and had a large weight compared with power and small rotation. The engine contained two engineer's compartments on each end, with all the devices necessary for running the locomotive inside. The engine and high voltage compartments were situated in the middle part of the body.

== History ==
After World War II almost no electric locomotives survived in Poland, and local industry was not yet able to start the production of such vehicles. The solution for this problem was sought mainly abroad and resulted in a decision to buy some components from England. The design for EP02 by Central Rail Industry Construction Office in Poznań was ready in 1951.

=== Introduction ===
In 1951 the design was sent to Pafawag, but the construction met with a few obstacles, mainly lack of material and parts. The first locos were directed into Warsaw-Ochota railway district in 1953. Soon many construction faults appeared, like wheel spinning after reaching 70 km/h (43 mph) speed, inconstant drive and vertical shakes. The faults were systematically corrected, and the experience was used during designing the ET21 and EU06.

=== Production ===
Loco nos.	Producer	Years of production	Quantity
01-07	Pafawag	1953–1954	7
08	Pafawag	1957	1

=== Operation ===
All the EP02s initially operated in Warsaw, but soon were moved to Łódź. Once there were enough EU07s, all EP02s were moved to Dębica. In 1971 the last three machines were retired and reassigned to work as heating power supplies (used solely to supply electric power from overhead to heat cars during longer stops at stations, it involved parking them at selected stations and removal of most of the electric, brake and control equipment, retaining only the pantographs and switches associated with the HEP supply). This prolonged EP02s’ life by 24 years—EP02-07 was working as a heating power supply in Zakopane until 1992 and EP02-08 in Przemyśl until 1996.

During the operation, the locomotives were modified by the addition of automatic brakes and heating systems.

== Locomotive assignment ==
Loco nos.	Operator	Remarks
07	Chabówka - heritage park	
02	Warsaw - railroad museum	
08	Kraków	

== See also ==
- Polish locomotives designation
