= PKP class EP07 =

Class of Polish electric locomotive

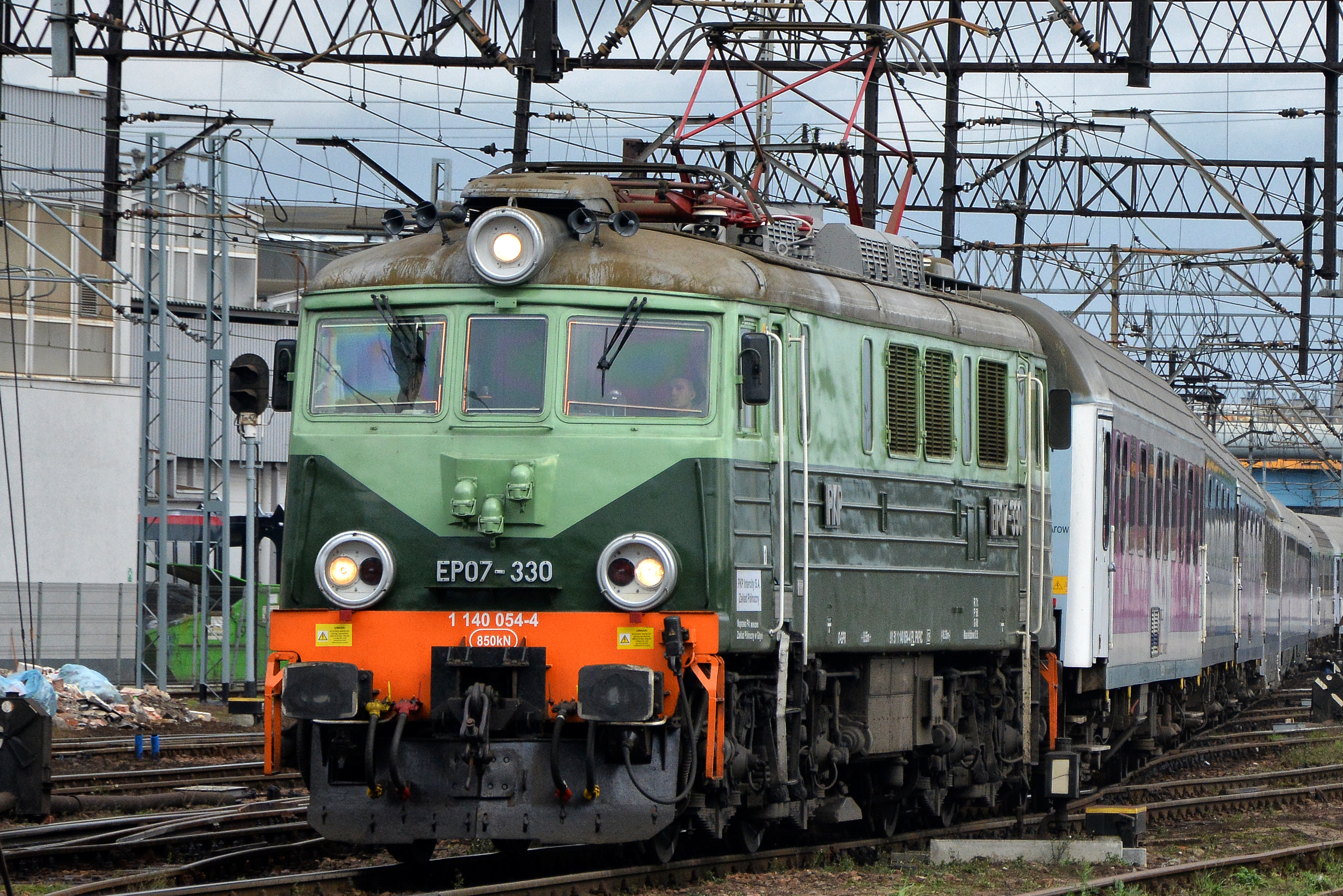
- EP07-330 in a classic livery of PKP Intercity arrives at Bydgoszcz Główna
Type and origin
- Power type: Electric
- Model: 4E (Pafawag); 303E (Cegielski)
- Rebuilder: Modification of EU07 locomotive done in several different Rolling Stock Workshops
- Rebuild date: 1995–2003
- Number rebuilt: 97
Specifications
- Configuration
  - UIC: Bo′Bo′
- Gauge: 1,435 mm (4 ft 8 1/2 in) standard gauge
- Wheel diameter: 1,250 mm (49.21 in)
- Length: 15,915 mm (52 ft 2 5/8 in)
- Width: 3,038 mm (9 ft 11 5/8 in)
- Height: 4,343 mm (14 ft 3 in)
- Axle load: 21.5 tonnes (21.2 long tons; 23.7 short tons)
- Loco weight: 80 tonnes (79 long tons; 88 short tons)
- Electric system/s: 3000 V DC Catenary
- Current pickup: Pantograph
- Traction motors: EE 541; LKb 535, 76:21 gear ratio
- Loco brake: Oerlikon
Performance figures
- Maximum speed: 125 km/h (78 mph)
- Power output: 2,000 kW (2,680 hp)
- Tractive effort: 280 kN (62,950 lbf)
Career
- Operators: PKP
- Nicknames: Siódema

PKP class EP07 is a class of standard-gauge electric locomotives used primarily for passenger trains in Poland. They are rebuilt EU07 class locomotives, which in turn are the direct successors to the post-war British EU06 series locomotives. The only operators of this locomotive series are PKP Intercity and Polregio.

These locomotives constitute the vast majority of electric locomotives still serving the PKP Group today - they are used to drive both light and heavy passenger trains through the whole of Poland.

== History ==
Since 1995, some EU07 locomotives have undergone a reconstruction, in which new traction motors with a higher permissible operating temperature - LKb535 were installed and the gear-ratio was changed from 79:18 to 76:21. Modifications were carried out, among others..: ZNTK Oleśnica, ZNTK Mińsk Mazowiecki, HCP Poznań, "Newag" Nowy Sącz.

The change of gear ratio did not, however, increase the design speed (misaligned transmission system - hollow shaft bearing on slide bearings), but decreased the engine speed, making it difficult to drive freight trains with this locomotive. It has become easier to maintain the maximum speed of the locomotive while reducing breakdowns. Starting acceleration has also increased - especially at higher speeds, which is realized with less weakening of the excitation (and thus higher motor power). The new LKb535 traction motors, instead of EE541, are adapted to the higher permissible operating temperature. The maximum permitted engine speed for EE541b is 2390 rpm, for EU07 series locomotives with maximum axle rims and 120 km/h, traction engines reach 2380 rpm and EP07 engines in the same situation only reach 1962 rpm, which increases their durability. The rebuilt units kept their rolling stock number (e.g. the EU07-330 locomotive became the EP07-330 locomotive).

In December 2006, 74 EP07 and EU07 class locomotives belonging to PKP Cargo were sold to Polregio. These locomotives have been modernized, the main transmission in EU07 has been changed. In addition, they received new livery, control sockets were dismantled, driver's cabs received thermal and acoustic insulation and new driver's and assistant's seats, and electric wipers and halogen headlights were installed. The locomotives have been renumbered from 1001 upwards.

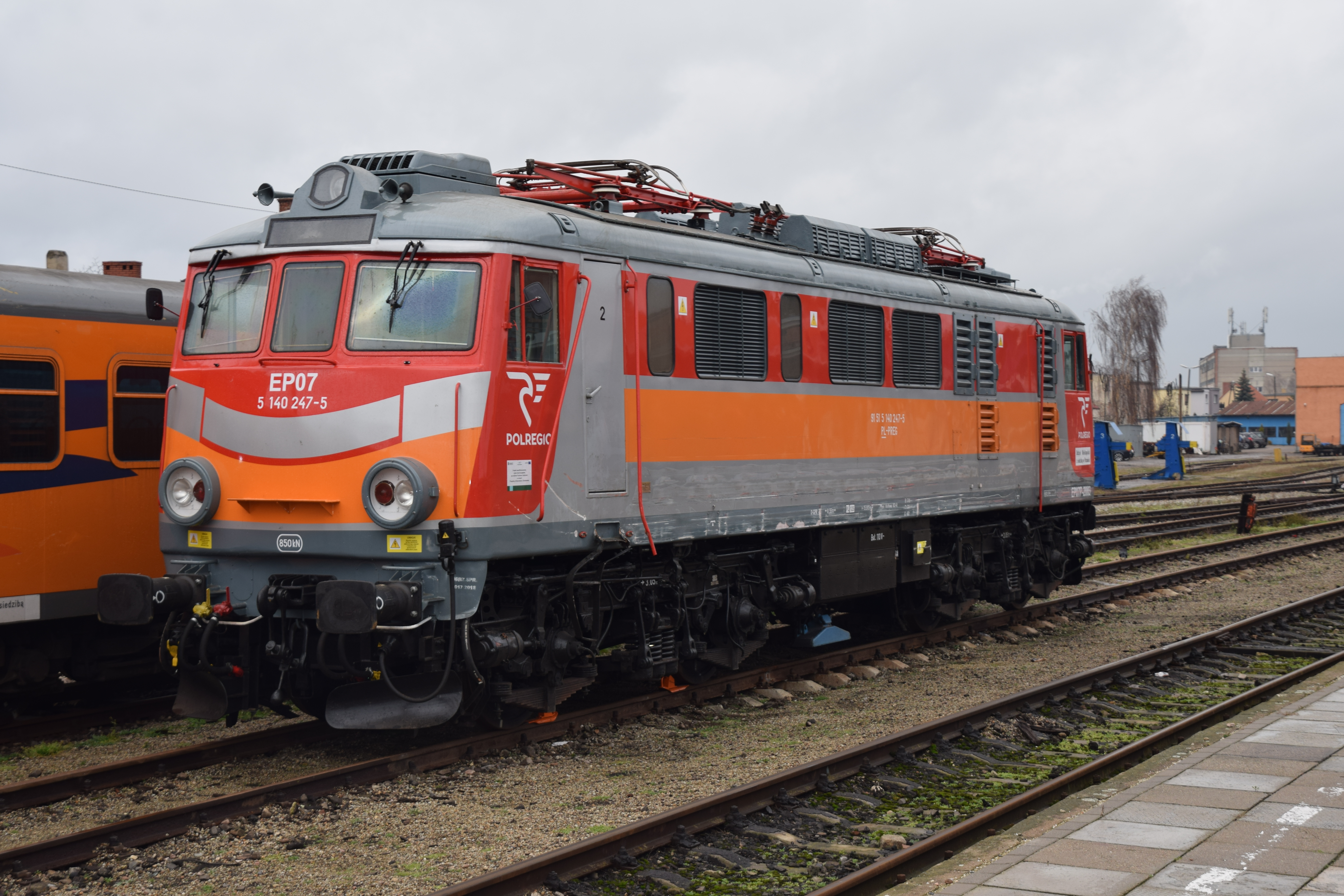
EP07P-2003

In the years 2012-2013 5 EU07 of Polregio was rebuilt to EP07P type, they received a new numbering from 2001 onwards. The modernization included installation of static converter, WN and NN cabinets, new panels in driver's cabins, air conditioning and repair of traction motors. On the front a diode display was installed.

== Nickname ==
- Siódemka (The Seven) - from the class
- Żółty trapez (Yellow trapez) - refers to EP07-361, from its historic livery

== See also ==
- Polish locomotives designation
