= PKP class ET22 =

Class of Polish electric locomotive

PKP ET22
- ET22-1024 in 2023
Type and origin
- Power type: Electric
- Builder: Pafawag
- Model: 201E
- Build date: Prototypes: 1969; Main series: 1971–1989
- Total produced: 1183 + 23 E-1000 class
Specifications
- Configuration
  - UIC: Co′Co′
- Gauge: 1,435 mm (4 ft 8 1/2 in) standard gauge
- Wheel diameter: 1,250 mm (49.21 in)
- Wheelbase: 3,500 mm (11 ft 5 3/4 in) bogies 13,800 mm (45 ft 3 1/4 in) between outer axles
- Length: 19,240 mm (63 ft 1 1/2 in)
- Width: 3,005 mm (9 ft 10 1/4 in)
- Height: 4,486 mm (14 ft 8 5/8 in)
- Axle load: 20 tonnes (19.7 long tons; 22.0 short tons)
- Loco weight: 120 tonnes (118 long tons; 132 short tons)
- Electric system/s: 3000 V DC Catenary
- Current pickup: Pantograph
- Traction motors: 6× EE541, 1:4.39 gear ratio
- Loco brake: Oerlikon Contraves
- Train brakes: Air
- Safety systems: Samoczynne Hamowanie Pociągu (SHP)
Performance figures
- Maximum speed: 125 km/h (78 mph)
- Power output: 3,000 kW (4,020 hp)
- Tractive effort: 420 kN (94,420 lbf)
Career
- Operators: PKP
- Nicknames: Byk (The Bull)

ET22 (also manufactured as Pafawag 201E) is a Polish six-axle electric freight locomotive built by Pafawag from 1969 to 1989. Factory designation is 201E. With 1183 units, it is one of the most numerous standard gauge electric locomotive built in Europe. Further 23 units were built for Morocco as E-1000 class.

== History ==
Soon after Pafawag started the production of the universal EU07 locomotive, The Rolling-stock Industry Central Bureau of Construction (Polish: Centralne Biuro Konstrukcyjne Przemysłu Taboru Kolejowego) began to develop a new heavy Co-Co freight locomotive. The electrical components of the locomotive, including the traction motors, were based on the equipment used in the EU07. The new locomotive had some modern features, including its body.

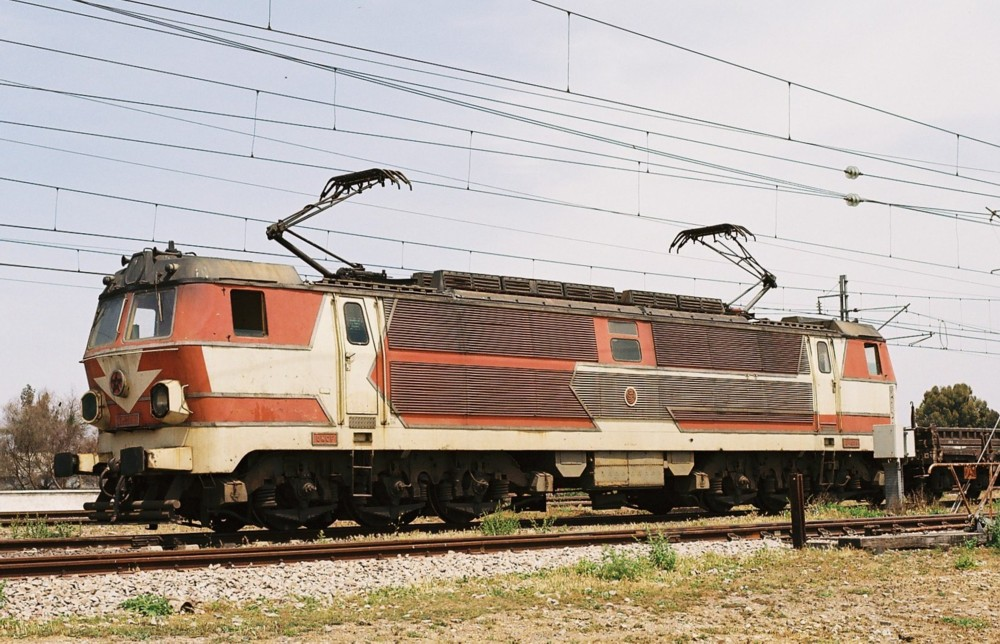
The E-1006 of 201Eg type used in Morocco.

The first two prototypes of the class 201E were ready by the end of 1969 (ET22-001 and 002). A short series of ten was made in 1971, and large scale production started the following year. PKP bought 1183 locomotives until the production was ceased in 1989 (numbered ET22-001 to ET22-1183, including two 201Ec type), the last of which were delivered in 1990. This made the ET22 class the most numerous standard gauge electric locomotive built in Europe.

During the production the design of the ET22 locomotive was slightly altered. Some changes were also made during repair and maintenance.

The body of the locomotives in use is different from the prototypes in details. There are three basic types of locomotive bodies where the main differences are the size and placement of the side windows, air intakes and ventilation grids. From ET22-013 big grids on the left side for resistors' cooling were moved from upper part to lower part of the body. From ET22-242 air intakes for engines' cooling were moved from a roof edge to side walls, on both sides, which is most popular configuration.

- ET22-001 - left side: four big ventilation grids in an upper part of the body, six air intakes and seven air outlets on a roof edge; right side: six air intakes in two groups on the roof edge.
- ET22-013 - left side: five ventilation grids in a lower part of the body, six air intakes and seven air outlets on a roof edge; right side as above.
- ET22-242 - left side: seven ventilation grids in a lower part and two in an upper part of the body, seven air outlets on a roof edge; right side: two ventilation grids in a lower part and two in an upper part of the body; added windows to all side doors.

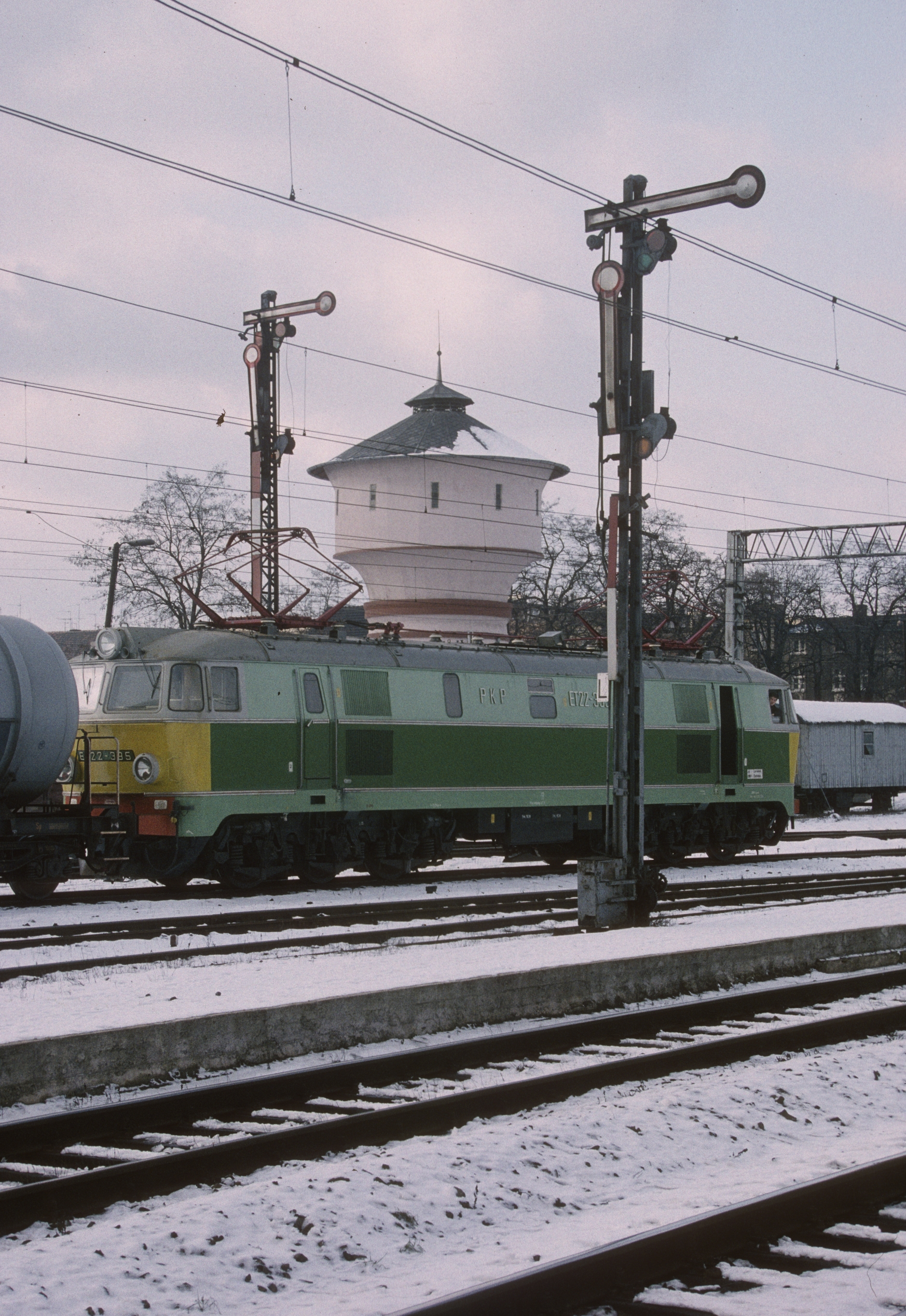
ET22-385 hauling freight through the town of Nowa Sól, 1993.

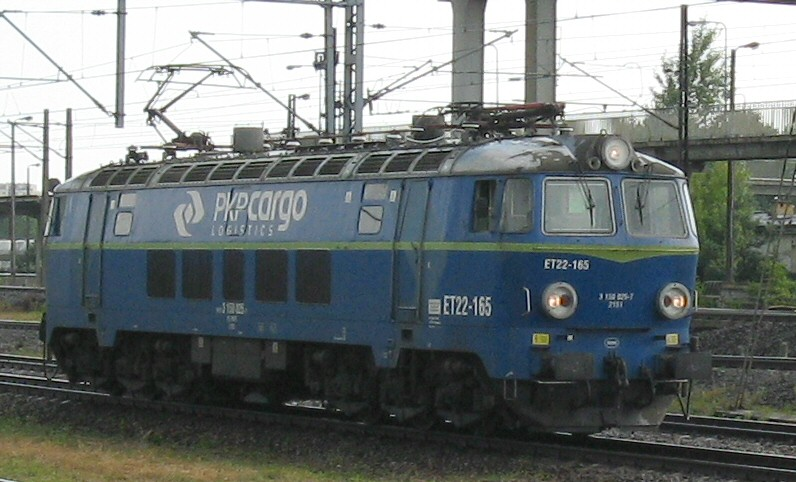
ET22-165 from the left side, showing early configuration of air intakes. Headlights are modernized.

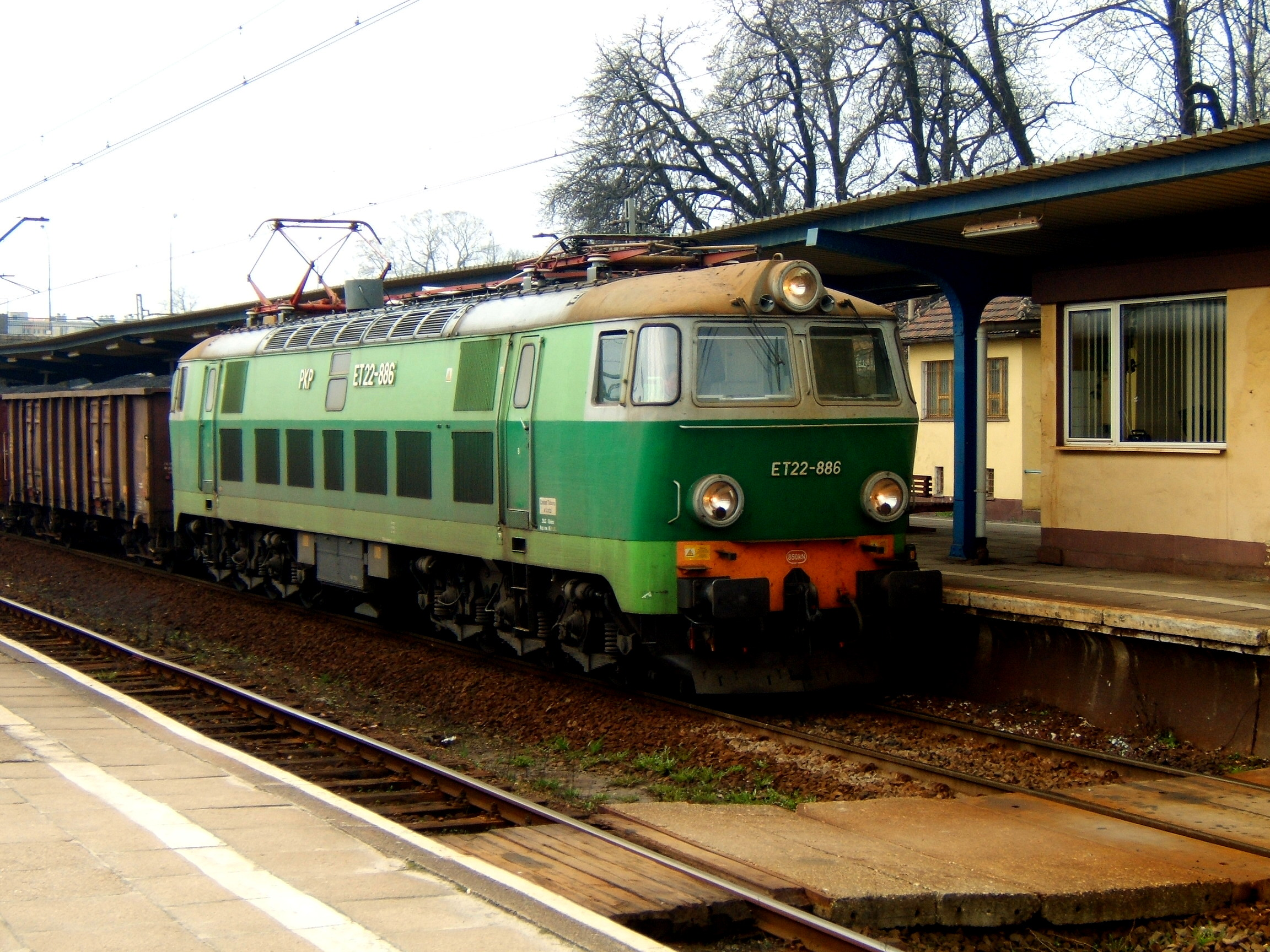
ET22-886 seen from the left side (air intakes in last configuration)

From ET22-122 there was simplified and improved a suspension of the body, without transversal beams. From ET22-282, big headlights, typical for Polish railways, were fitted in conical covers instead of hexagonal.

In 1973 Pafawag built a prototype passenger locomotive of the building type 201Ea, which had a different gear ratio for top speed 160 km/h, with no other substantial changes. The locomotive was classified as EP23-001, being a sole machine of this class. After a series of tests, the locomotive characteristics were found unsatisfactory and no more were built. In 1979 the prototype was rebuilt to ET22 standard and renamed ET22-121 in place of former locomotive 121 scrapped in 1977. Today this locomotive is conserved in Jaworzyna Śląska railway museum.

Another two prototype locomotives were produced in 1978 as type 201Ec (also known as type 202E). Main changes introduced were an improved secondary suspension, multiple unit control and several small modernisations, like automatic door control. Wheelbase of bogies increased from 3,500 to 3,800 mm (11 to 12 ft) and they were connected with a linkage, but the overall wheelbase increased only by 80 mm (3.1 in). Those locomotives were first given the numbers 501 and 502. As the production of ET22 continued, those were renumbered to 701 and 702 and finally to 1001 and 1002, which they carried until the end. A modernization was considered successful, but in a view of an economical crisis in 1980s in Poland, the authorities of a planned economy lost interest in starting production of an improved locomotive.

In the 1980s PKP needed locomotives for passenger service. Since the freight service declined, the ET22 could be used for passenger service. They were fitted with main reservoir pipes required for the automatic door control of the passenger coaches.

In 2004 the locomotive ET22-315 was modernised in ZNLE Gliwice and renamed ET22-2000 (201Em type). Main modifications affected the electrical and mechanical main components as well as the driver's cab which was equipped with a modern computerised control system and joysticks. The locomotive is painted in PKP Cargo colours.

== Moroccan E-1000 class ==
The only locomotives of 201E family built for export were 23 modified units of 201Eg type for Moroccan railways ONCF, delivered in 1976. They differ in equipment and details, most noticeably they have single-part pantographs Faiveley. Initially they were meant to haul phosphorite trains from mountain parts of the country to Casablanca, later they found use in passenger trains. In 2003 three were re-sold to Polish private operator CTL Rail (E-1003, 1018, 1021) and modified to Polish standards.

== Technical data ==
Despite its ET designation (marking a freight locomotive) ET22 is a universal locomotive, and it is occasionally seen in passenger traffic. Its maximum continuous power is 3,000 kW (4,000 hp) and it is the biggest single-box Co-Co locomotive in PKP service. Technical features enable this engine to pull heavy freight trains of up to 3,150 tonnes [t] (3,100 long tons; 3,470 short tons) with a speed of 70 km/h and trains of up to 2,700 t (2,660 long tons; 2,980 short tons) at 80 km/h. When used as passenger locomotive it can pull trains weighing up to 700 t (690 long tons; 770 short tons) t at 125 km/h. This is caused by several features and solutions based on passenger EU07 and EU06 locomotives. Four EE-451A engines are isolated in H class with maximum temperature allowed of 180 °C. They have four main and four commutative poles. Because of its length and the wheelbase between axles ET22 locomotive performs poorly on tight curves when compared to the older ET21 locomotives, despite the designers having been given the same parameters for minimum curve diameter. Using the ET22 at winding tracks can cause severe damage both to rails and locomotive bogies. This required several modifications, which are made presently. These changes are essential due to the withdrawal of older ET21 locomotives, and that ET41s are ineffective on highland tracks due to being overpowered (highland trains length is limited by short station tracks). The locomotives were originally painted in a two-tone green livery, with grey roofs. In the 1980s and 1990s their ends were painted yellow for better visibility, but during further repairs an original, the more aesthetic old scheme was being restored, or only a narrow yellow stripe was retained.

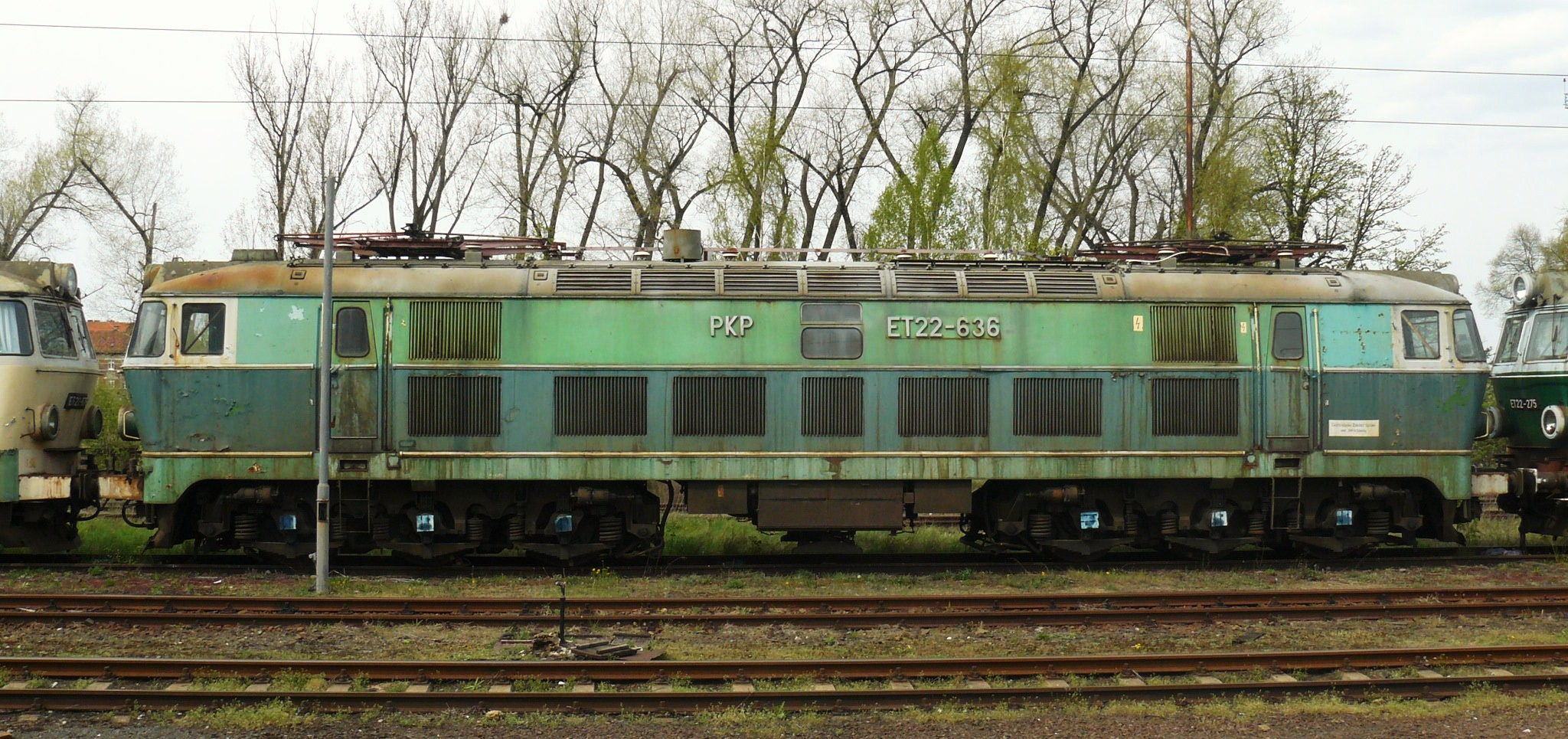
ET22-636 showing a final configuration of air intakes on left side

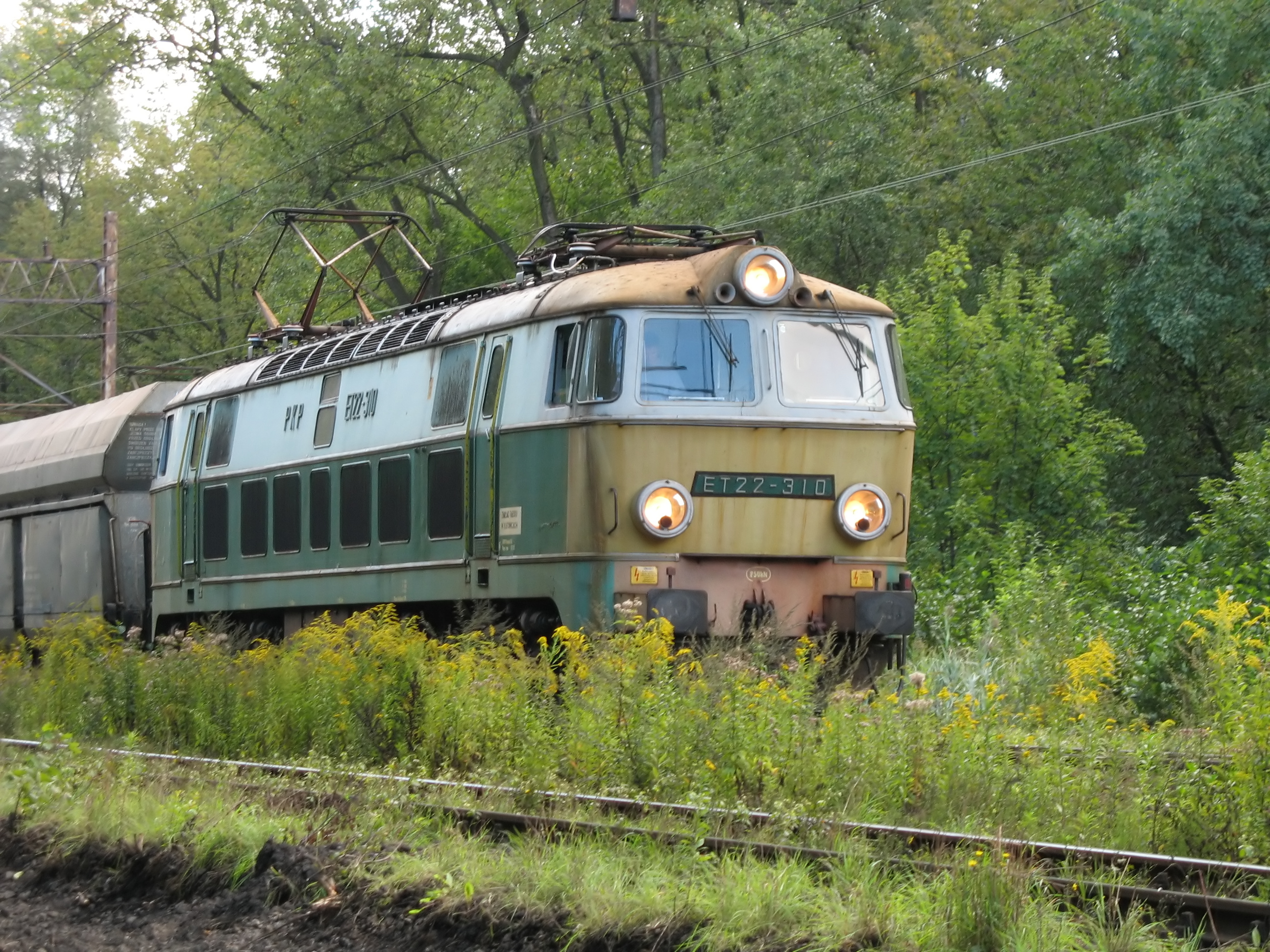
ET22-310 in 1980s livery with yellow front

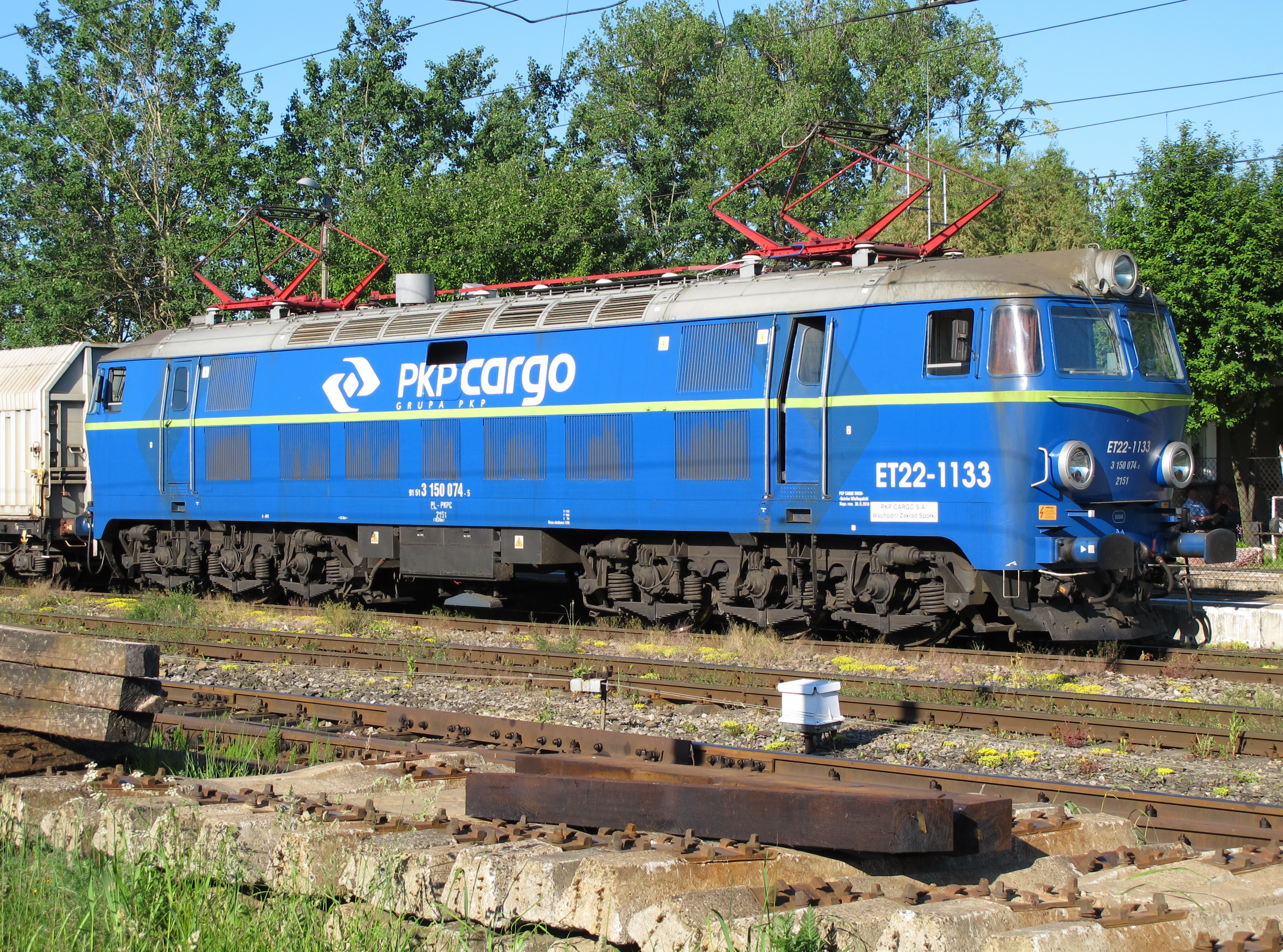
ET22-1133 in new PKP cargo livery

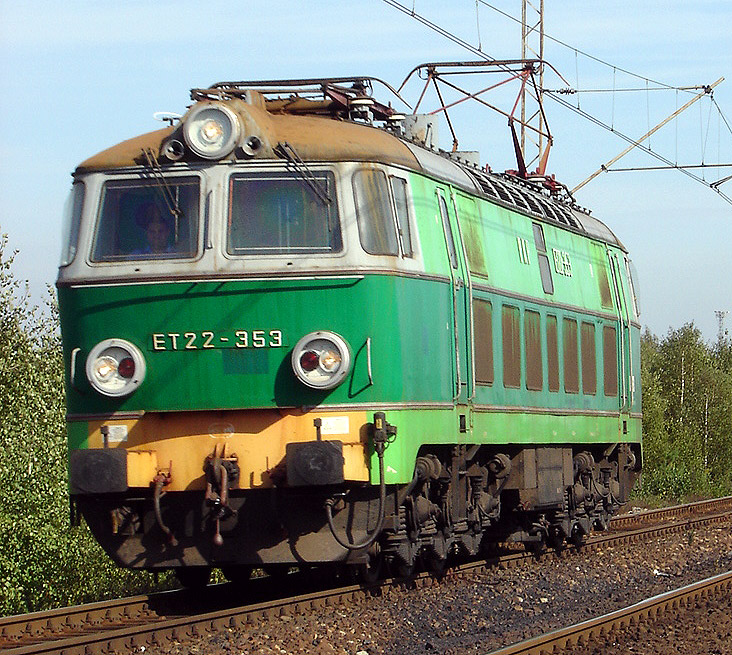
ET22-353 with modernized headlights

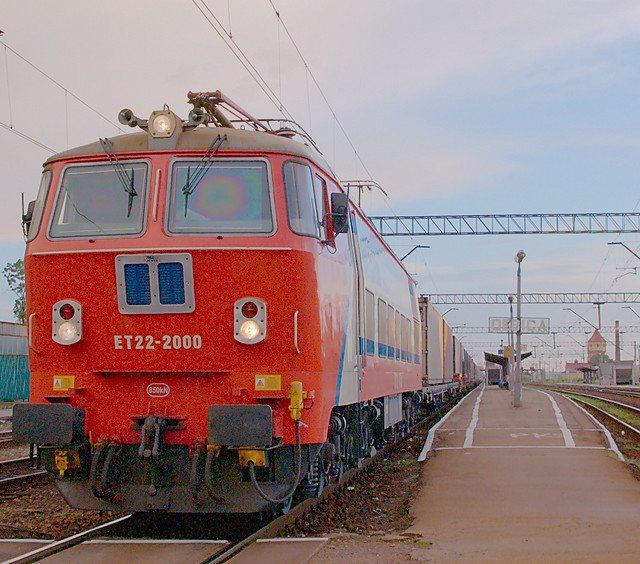
Modernized ET22-2000

== Nicknames ==
- Byk (bull) - because of its size
- Obano (fighter) - for how long it's lasted
- Rekin (shark) - only halogen light version

== Accidents ==
- On, 28 February 1977, ET22-121 crashed into three other waiting locomotives of its class (122, 132, 189) at Psary station (2 killed). All four locomotives were written off.
- On 3 March 2012, ET22-1105 was involved in the Szczekociny rail crash.

== See also ==
- Polish locomotives designation
