= PKP class EU06 =

Class of Polish electric locomotives

EU06
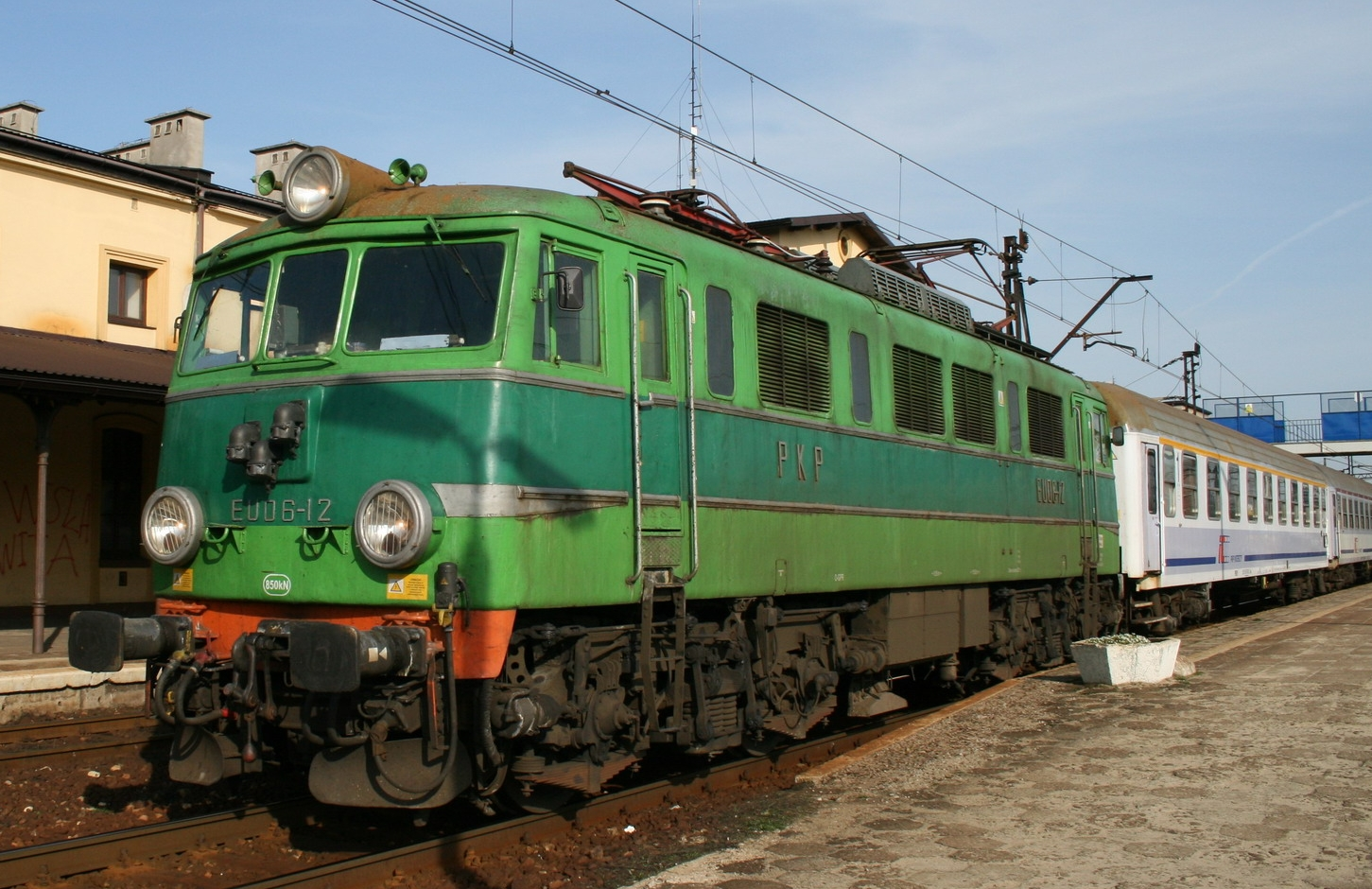
- EU06-12 on 8 April 2008 at Trzebinia working TLK3710 1158 Przemyśl Gl – Poznań Gl
Type and origin
- Power type: Electric
- Builder: English Electric Vulcan Foundry
- Build date: 1962
- Total produced: 20
Specifications
- Configuration
  - UIC: Bo′Bo′
- Gauge: 1,435 mm (4 ft 8 1/2 in) standard gauge
- Driver dia.: 4 ft 1 in (1,245 mm)
- Wheelbase: each bogie 10 ft (3.05 m)
- Length: 48 ft (14.63 m) over buffer beams
- Width: 3,038 mm (9 ft 11 5/8 in)
- Height: 4,343 mm (14 ft 3 in)
- Adhesive weight: 20 long tons (20 t; 22 short tons)
- Loco weight: 79.5 long tons (80.8 t; 89.0 short tons)
- Electric system/s: 3000 v DC overhead
- Current pickup(s): two pantographs
- Traction motors: four traction motors, type EE 541A 79:18
- Transmission: electric
- Loco brake: Oerlikon
Performance figures
- Maximum speed: 78 mph (126 km/h)
- Power output: 1,500 bhp (1,100 kW)
- Tractive effort: 280 kN (63,000 lb_{f})
Career
- Operators: PKP
- Class: EU06
- Number in class: 20
- Nicknames: Anglik ("The Englishman")
- Delivered: 1962–1965
- First run: 1962
- Current owner: PKP Cargo S.A.
- Disposition: None in use, 7 Preserved, Remaining 13 Scrapped

EU06 (also manufactured as AEI E) is a class of electric locomotives in service with the Polish state railway PKP.

== Technical details ==
EU06 has driving cabs at both ends. The locomotives are equipped for multiple working which allows one driver to drive two coupled engines from one cab. One locomotive can haul passenger trains of up to 650 tonnes (640 long tons; 720 short tons) at 125 kilometres per hour (78 mph) and freight trains of up to 2,000 tonnes (2,000 long tons; 2,200 short tons) at a speed of 70 kilometres per hour (43 mph). Two locomotives coupled in multiple can haul a freight train of up to 3,600 tonnes (3,500 long tons; 4,000 short tons). These figures apply to driving on level gradients.

All members and panels are made of Cor-Ten steel and the underframe is a shallow, cellular structure with closely spaced light-gauge longitudinal and transverse members plated above and below to make a set of closed cells.

The body sides are built up on rectangular vertical tubes forming a set of pillars and are double-skinned for additional strength and rigidity. This maintains the shape of the locomotive allowing the roof of the entire machine space between the two cabs to be removed to allow machinery to be lifted out and replaced. The superstructure is built to withstand buffing loads up to 295 long tons (300 t; 330 short tons). English Electric made extensive use of aluminium alloys and GRP for panelling, doors and ducts.

Current collection is by single-pan air operated pantographs, which feed the main power circuits by a high-speed circuit breaker. The main resistances were made by Metropolitan-Vickers' parent company, Associated Electrical Industries. The four traction motors are permanently connected in series pairs, with series-parallel combinations between pairs. Parallel and 12 field weakening positions give a total of 55 running notches. The four traction motors have Alstom quill drives.

The minimum curve radius that the locomotives can negotiate is 6 chains (396 ft; 121 m): any curve tighter than this could cause severe flange wear on the wheels. In order to reduce flange forces, the bogies are linked by a tubular-framed spring-loaded inter-coupling and flange lubricators are fitted to each wheel.

== History ==
In 1936–1938 the Contractors' Committee, a joint venture of Metropolitan-Vickers and English Electric, had supplied six 1,200 brake horsepower (890 kW) electric locomotives and 80 three-car electric multiple units for the electrification of Warsaw suburban services. British Insulated Cables supplied the overhead line equipment. In 1945 British Insulated merged with a competitor to become British Insulated Callender's Cables, and in 1949 Metropolitan-Vickers, English Electric and BICC contracts to replace locomotives, EMUs and equipment damaged in the Second World War.

In the early 1950s PKP urgently wanted mixed-traffic electric locomotives for the rapid electrification of Poland's railways. ET21 freight locomotives were already in production but there was a lack of passenger locomotives. The plan was to buy several items of foreign-built locomotives and a license and start domestic production afterwards.

In 1956 talks with companies from Austria and Switzerland started, but were broken off soon after. In June 1959 Poland awarded a new contract to for overhead electrification and 20 locomotives to the Contractors' Committee, which now included BICC as well as AEI Traction and English Electric. The contract included a licence agreement for Poland to manufacture 2,000 tons of copper contact wire, enough to electrify 1,450 miles (2,330 kilometres) of railway.

Not all electric devices were included in the licence agreement. EU06 locomotives are roughly similar to the British Rail Class 83 mechanically, which were built by English Electric at Vulcan Foundry, Newton-le-Willows in the UK, in the same period; electrically the layout and equipment was similar to classes 5E/5E1/6E/6E1 operating on South African Railways.

The first EU06 locomotive was delivered to Poland in early 1962 and after series of trials it was assigned to Kraków Prokocim depot. Seven locomotives had been delivered by the end of April 1962 and 19 by the end of the year. Delivery of the last locomotive was delayed until 1965 by failures of the armature. The locomotives were operated on all lines serviced by Kraków Prokocim depot.

Class EU06 was an innovative design that became a milestone in Polish motive power construction. Along with the EU07, a similar locomotive class built in Poland under licence by Pafawag in Wrocław and Cegielski in Poznań, almost 500 locomotives were built. EU07 locomotives were also the basis of the duplex freight locomotives of PKP class ET41. Several construction innovations from class EU06 were introduced into later classes such as EP08, ET22 and EP09.

The last EU06 unit traveled from Žylina to Katowice on March 31, 2009. In the middle of December 2010, 7 out of the 14 remaining locomotives were scrapped at Kraków Prokocim Cargo Station; those 7 locomotives were: EU06-02, EU06-04, EU06-05, EU06-08, EU06-11, EU06-14 and EU06-16. The first locomotive of the class (EU06-01) ended its service in 2004, due to its technical performance certificate expiring. Remaining extant locomotives worked for PKP Cargo until 2012, and were afterwards kept in long-term storage in poor condition. In 2012, EU06-01 became an active monument in Chabówka Railway Heritage Park.

== Liveries ==
English Electric delivered the EU06 class in a two-tone green, with a broad dark green waistband on a pale green body.

In recognition of the locomotives being built in the UK, it was hoped that one example of the class would be repainted in British Rail Electric Blue livery, complete with BR Lion and Wheel insignia. Instead, an EU07/EP07 – EP07-1051 – was painted in the livery in February 2008.

== Nicknames ==
- Szóstka ("The six") – from the class number
- Anglik ("Englishman") – from the country of origin

== See also ==
- Polish locomotives designation
