= PKP class EP08 =

Class of Polish electric locomotive

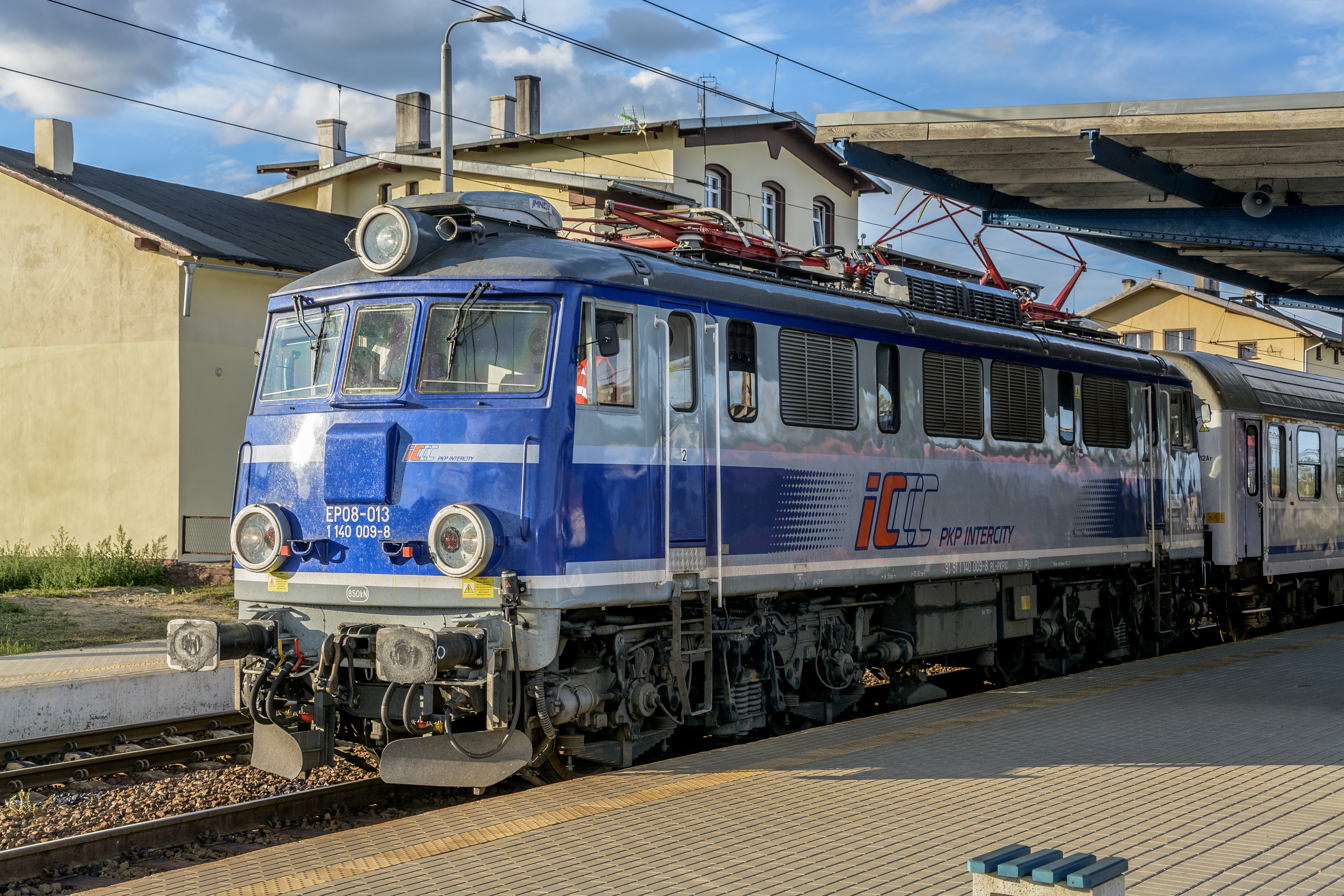
- EP08-013 in Laskowice Pomorskie
Type and origin
- Power type: Electric
- Builder: (Poland) Pafawag
- Build date: 1972–1976
- Total produced: 15
- Number rebuilt: 15
Specifications
- Configuration
  - UIC: Bo′Bo′
- Gauge: 1,435 mm (4 ft 8 1/2 in) standard gauge
- Wheel diameter: 1,250 mm (49.21 in)
- Length: 15,915 mm (52 ft 2 5/8 in)
- Width: 3,038 mm (9 ft 11 5/8 in)
- Height: 4,343 mm (14 ft 3 in)
- Loco weight: 80 tonnes (79 long tons; 88 short tons)
- Electric system/s: 3000 V DC Catenary
- Current pickup: Pantograph
- Traction motors: 4 × EE541g, 77:24 gear ratio
- Loco brake: Oerlikon Contraves
- Safety systems: SHP
Performance figures
- Maximum speed: 140 km/h (87 mph)
- Power output: 2,000 kW (2,680 hp)
Career
- Operators: PKP
- Nicknames: Świnia (the Pig)
- Delivered: 1973

EP08 (also manufactured as Pafawag 102E) is the name for a Polish electric locomotive used by the Polish railway operator Polskie Koleje Państwowe (PKP), produced between 1972 and 1976 in Pafawag, Wrocław. The construction is based on the EU07 locomotive.

== History ==
In the 1970s PKP intended to increase speed of Polish passenger trains, which resulted mainly in building CMK line (Trunk Line) and the modernisation of EU05 locomotives into EP05 series. Meanwhile a project was opened to introduce new electric locomotives able to pull trains with speeds upwards of 125 km/h (78 mph), based on British EU06 and local EU07 machines.

In 1972 the first prototype left Pafawag works and until 1976 a total number of 15 units had been produced. Further production was ceased due to huge orders of freight locomotives and insufficient funds for importing foreign parts for the machine.

EP08 were the first locomotives in Poland to exceed the top speed limit of 125 km/h (78 mph) and contributed (alongside the EP05 class) to the fast development of high-speed passenger connections. All machines of this class are stationed in Warsaw but, as top speed on Warsaw-Poznań line had been increased to 160 km/h (99 mph), they are no longer used on a regular basis and serve as auxiliary machines, mostly pulling trains from Warsaw to Zakopane. Since 2015, EP08 began receiving major repair and modernizations in ZNTK Oleśnica, later Olkol Oleśnica. Halogen headlights were installed, air conditioning was added, modern radiotelephones were added (except 001), and multiple steering parts were removed (again except 001).

== Technical data ==
As the EP08 is tightly based on EU06 and EU07 locomotives it is important to compare those series while writing about technical features. EP08 is a Bo′Bo′ locomotive with four axles mounted on two bogies. Each axle is propelled separately by an EE541a traction motor. The cab has two identical crew compartments on both ends.

The main differences between EP08 and previous EU07 locomotives are as follows. Transmission was changed from 79:18 to 77:24 which resulted in a top speed of 160 km/h (99 mph). However, the locomotives performed poorly at this speed, so the top speed was lowered to 140 km/h (87 mph). The first five units were equipped with plain bearings, which proved insufficient for higher speeds; as a result, these units were rebuilt as EU07 series (numbers 241 to 244). Later units used roller bearings.

Another significant change comparing to EU07 series was exchange of traction motors to newer EE541g type with higher isolation class. Windscreens were thickened to 14 mm (0.551 in) with heating layer and pneumatic wipers. However, some solutions from EU07 locomotives which were rather faulty, were copied into this machine, like poor access to internal devices.

EU08 is suited for multiple steering work. Locomotive's cab resembles those of EU06 and EU07, but have different, orange and brown painting. Since June 2007 PKP Intercity has started repainting those machines into new, blue and white colours.

== Nicknames ==
- Świnia (Pig) – from its original orange painting.
- Arka Gdynia - from its nickname "Świnia" which refers to EP08-001, Arka Gdynia is one of the most hated football clubs in Poland, deliberately being called pigs from their fans behaviour, conflicts, etc.
