= PKP class ET21 =

PKP ET21
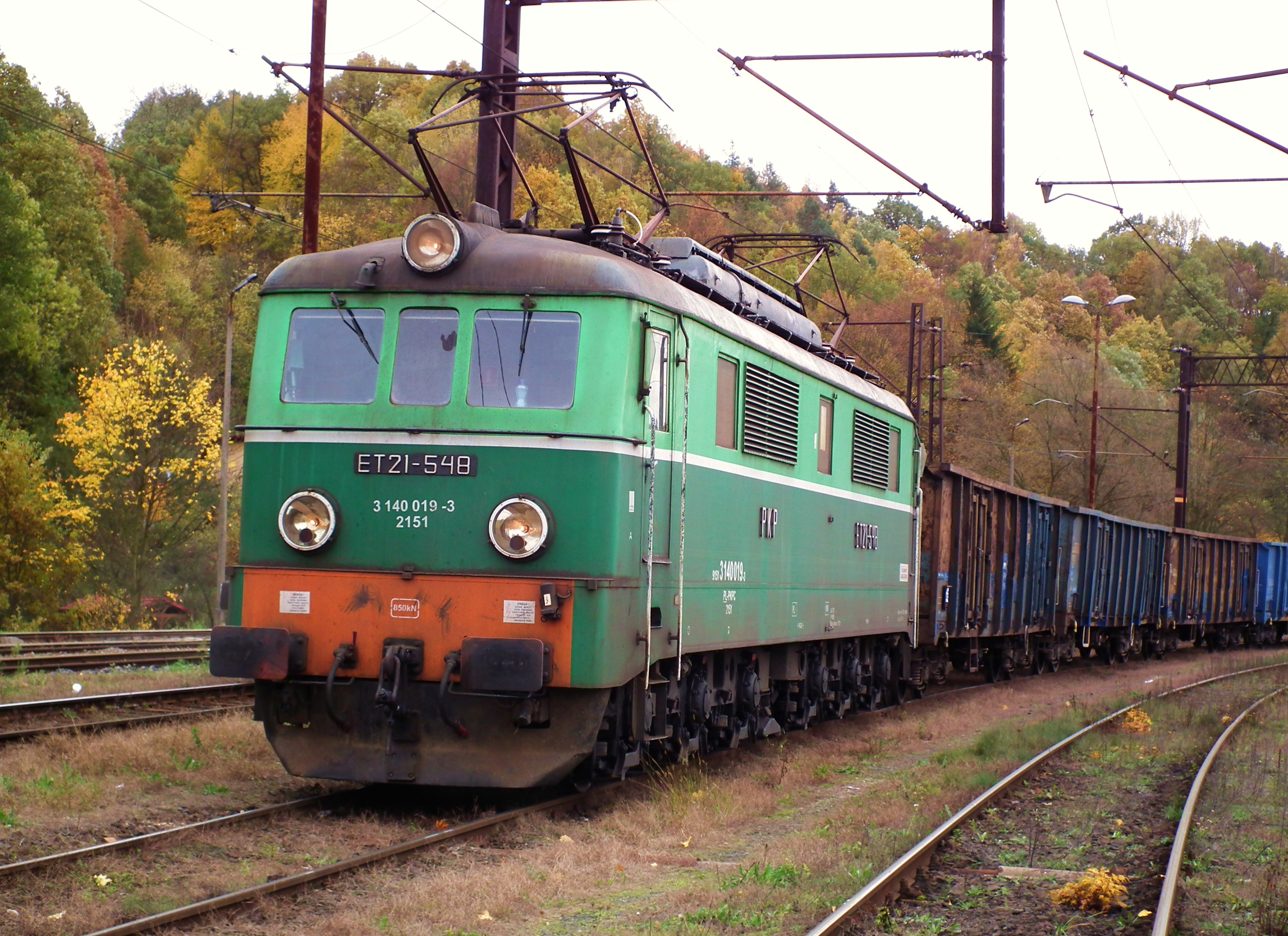
- ET21-548
Type and origin
- Power type: Electric
- Builder: Pafawag
- Model: 3E, 3E/1
- Build date: 1957–1971
- Total produced: 726
Specifications
- Configuration
  - UIC: Co′Co′
- Gauge: 1,435 mm (4 ft 8 1/2 in) standard gauge
- Wheel diameter: 1,250 mm (49.21 in)
- Length: 16,820 mm (55 ft 2 1/4 in)
- Width: 3,000 mm (9 ft 10 1/8 in)
- Height: 4,620 mm (15 ft 1 7/8 in)
- Axle load: 20 tonnes (19.7 long tons; 22.0 short tons)
- Loco weight: 114 tonnes (112 long tons; 126 short tons)
- Electric system/s: 3000 V DC Catenary
- Current pickup(s): Pantograph
- Traction motors: 6 × LKb635, 85:24 gear ratio
- Transmission: Electric
- Loco brake: Westinghouse
- Train brakes: Air
- Safety systems: Samoczynne Hamowanie Pociągu (SHP)
Performance figures
- Maximum speed: 100 km/h (62 mph)
- Power output: 1,860 kW (2,490 hp)
- Tractive effort: 146 kN (32,820 lbf)
Career
- Operators: PKP
- Nicknames: Telewizor, Sputnik

ET21 (also manufactured as Pafawag 3E) is a name for a Polish electric freight locomotive produced between years 1957 to 1971 in Pafawag. It was the first post-war Polish electric locomotive, designed in 1955. Besides being delivered for PKP, ET21 locomotives were delivered to the mining industry, where they are used up to now.

== History ==
Mechanical part of the locomotive was designed in the Rolling-stock Industry Central Bureau of Construction (Pl.: Centralne Biuro Konstrukcyjne Przemysłu Taboru Kolejowego) in Poznań, basing on instructions from the Railway Electrification Office (Pl.: Biuro Elektryfikacji Kolei). Electrical part of ET21 locomotive was slightly based on Soviet VL22^{M} locomotive. Production started in 1957 at Pafawag in Wrocław in co-operation with Dolmel (Wrocław), Elta (Łódź), Elester (Łódź) and Apena (Bielsko-Biała) companies. After first two units (prototypes) were ready the serial production started. At the beginning those locomotives bore E600 designation, which was changed to E06 and after introducing RN-58/MK0001 norm to present ET21. By the end of 1958 18 new machines were ready.

After producing 70 first units and gaining significant experience Pafawag decided to introduce several technical changes into locomotives. This included decreasing weight by approx. 8 t., levelling weight on all axles, changing air intake system and crew cabin as well as installing electric carriage heating system. First locomotives were introduced into Warsaw-Katowice-Gliwice line. As the number of engines was increasing they started serving on all electrified lines in Poland. After the introduction of the EU06 and EU07 locomotives, the ET21 was systematically transferred to freight only service. Systematical withdrawal of this series began on the brink of the 1980s and 1990s and lasts until today. Some units are still used on mountainous areas, especially on Tarnów-Krynica-Zdrój, Kraków-Zakopane and Wrocław-Wałbrzych lines. The only running first-series ET21 locomotive is ET21-57 machine located in Chabówka railway museum.

== Service outside PKP ==
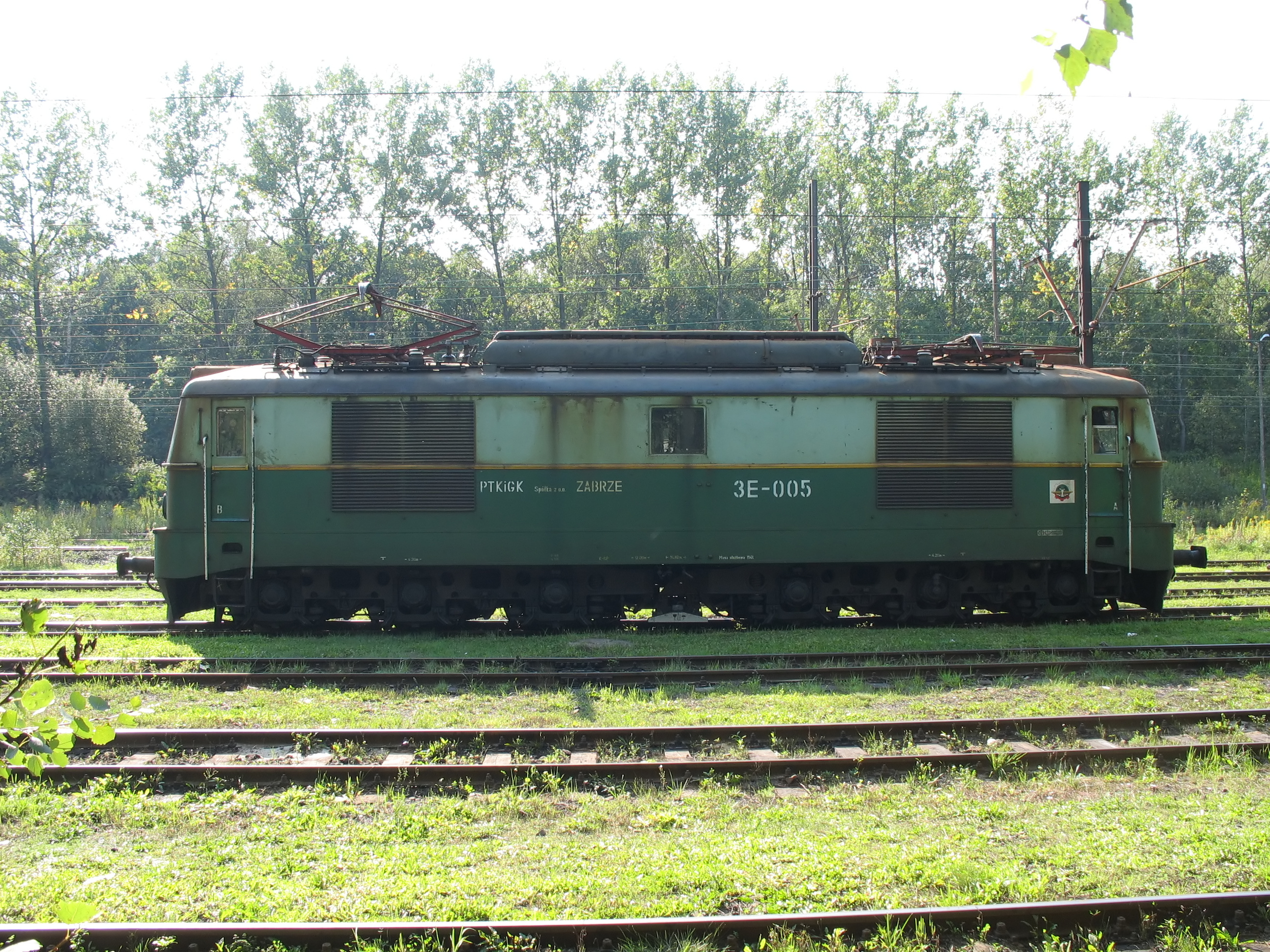
3E-005 locomotive used in mining industry

Along with delivering locomotives for PKP Pafawag started selling machines for mining industry, specifically for Coal Mining Filling Materials Company (Pl.: Przedsiębiorstwo Materiałów Podsadzkowych Przemysłu Węglowego - PMP-PW). Those locomotives bore designation 3E - first series and 3E/1 - second, modernised series. The first locomotive delivered for PMP-PW was given 3E-10 number, the last one bore 3E/1-77 number. The main difference between PKP ET21 and 3E locomotives was that coal mining locomotives were lacking in carriage heating systems. 3E and 3E/1 machines were and are still used for transporting filling sand, power plant waste and coal, especially in Upper Silesia region. It is quite common to use those locomotives in couples, with one of them pulling and the other pushing the train.

In the years 1973-1980 PKP borrowed several items of 3E/1 locomotives and changed their designation to ET21 with adding additional 9 figure to serial number. Such locomotives were running for PKP for over two years. In exchange PKP sold in the 1980s 14 units of ET21 locomotives to the industry. Those locomotives remained named ET21 but additional 1 figure was added to serial number.

== Technical data ==
ET21 is a Co-Co electric locomotive, suited for pulling freight trains weighing up to 2500 t. with top speed of 65 km/h or passenger trains with top speed of 100 km/h.

=== Engines ===
The locomotive is equipped with six LKb-635 (though some sources give LKa-635) engines which are mounted on the bogies with a tram system. The engines propel the axles with an 85:24 transmission. There are three ways of connecting the engines: series connection (all six engines in one series), series-parallel connection (three engines in one series - two groups) and parallel-series connection (two engines in one series - three groups). Four-step reduction of engine excitation (up to 50%) is made by bypassing parts of main pole's windings with shunts and resistors. Shunts and resistors are in parallel connection with main pole's winding. Each engine has four steel main poles, isolated with varnish and four commutation poles made of one steel block.

=== Bogies ===
A Co′Co′ type of the locomotive means it is equipped with two bogies, each of them having three axles with separate propulsion for each wheel set. Bogies are coupled with each other. Box is supported on bogies with three slides. Middle slide supports it chassis in horizontal position during start and braking.

=== Body ===
The body and chassis are completely welded construction with crew compartments on both ends. It contains two machine compartments and one high voltage compartment. Moving between crew cabins is enabled by 570 mm wide corridor running along the box wall. machine compartments are reached through the doors in the back walls of crew compartments.

Both crew compartments are equipped in exactly the same way. It includes switch board, hand-brake and electric cooker on the left-hand side, drive controller, direction controller and brakes valves on the right-hand side. Air manometers and Hasler type train event recorder are mounted in front of the engineer's place. SHP (automatic train brake) button is located next to drive controller. Windscreens are equipped with 150W heater used during winter. Additional, 300W heater is located under the dashboard in order to heat crew's legs, but this was installed only in modernised 3E/1 version. Crew compartment A has washbasin and clothes locker installed. Sound horn and sander buttons are located on the floor.

In the wall of machine compartments large blinds are used as air intakes. On the opposite side, along the corridor rectangular blins are mounted between windows. Locomotives of 3E series have three windows on each side whilst 3E/1 locomotives have two windows on the side of machine compartments and three windows on the corridor side. There are compressors and blowers on the floors of machine compartments and two air tanks, 220 liters each, are mounted under the roof. In a non-modernised machine battery box was installed in A crew compartment whilst in a modernised version batteries were placed inside machine compartments. Air tank for raising the pantograph is located in B crew compartment.

All high voltage devices and resistors are located inside high voltage compartment. In modernised version of ET21 locomotive this is placed in the middle part of the box. It is possible to completely remove the framework of high voltage compartment. Locomotive's roof is divided into several parts and over the high voltage compartment it is removable.

== Nicknames ==
- Telewizor (TV set) - from the shape
- Sputnik
