= PKP class EU07 =

Class of Polish electric locomotive

EU07
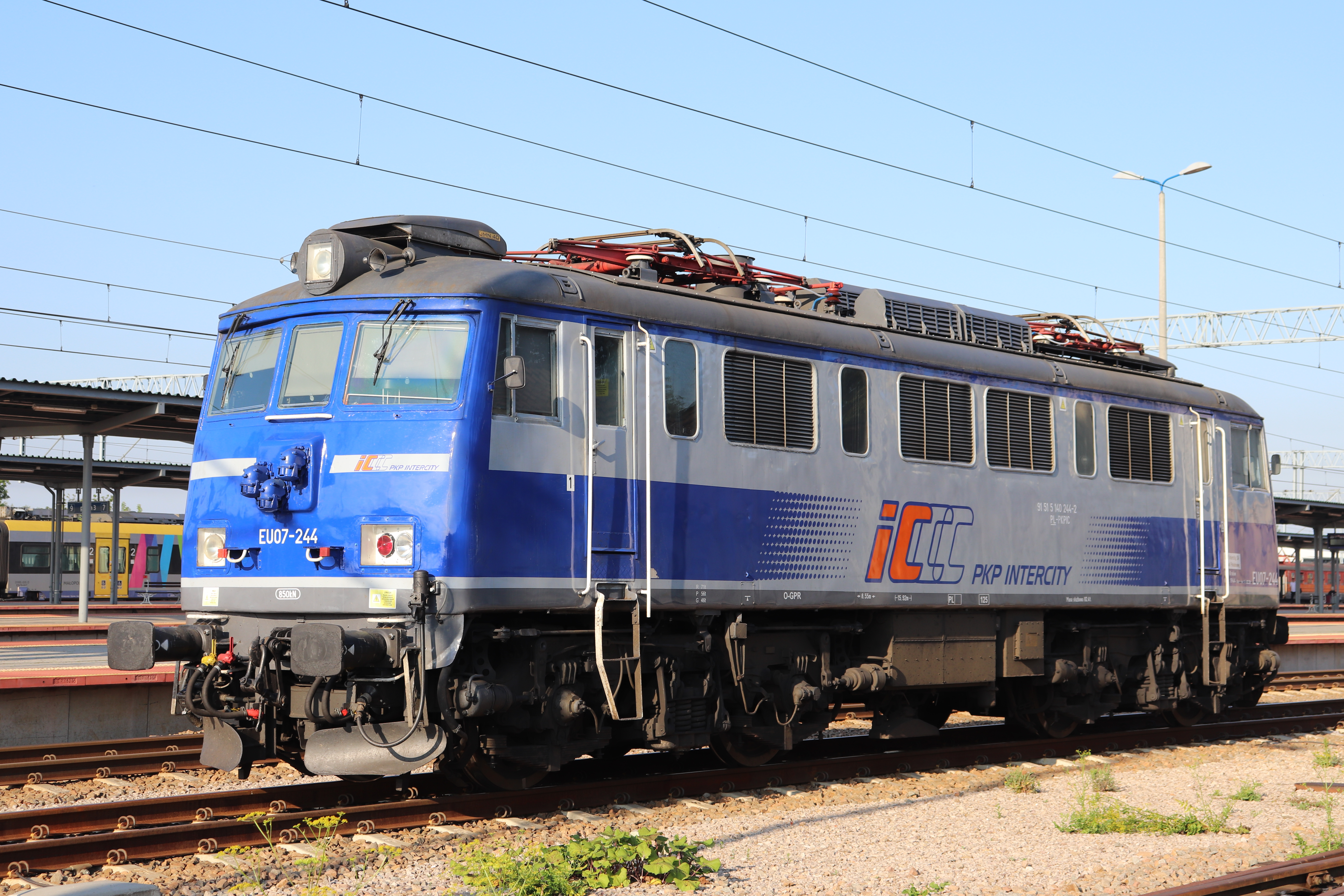
- Electric locomotive EP07-244 of PKP Intercity in 2020
Type and origin
- Power type: Electric
- Builder: Pafawag Wrocław; Cegielski
- Model: 4E (Pafawag); 303E (Cegielski)
- Build date: 1965–1994
- Total produced: 483
Specifications
- Configuration
  - AAR: B-B
  - UIC: Bo′Bo′
- Gauge: 1,435 mm (4 ft 8 1/2 in) standard gauge
- Driver dia.: 1,250 mm (49.21 in)
- Length: 15.915 m (52 ft 2 5/8 in)
- Width: 3.038 m (9 ft 11 5/8 in)
- Height: 4.343 m (14 ft 3 in)
- Loco weight: 80 t (79 long tons; 88 short tons)
- Electric system/s: 3,000 V DC overhead
- Current pickup: Pantograph
- Traction motors: EE 541B
- Transmission: Gear ratio: 79:18
- Loco brake: Oerlikon
Performance figures
- Maximum speed: 125 km/h (78 mph); 160 km/h (99 mph) (EU07A)
- Power output: 2,000 kW (2,680 hp)
- Tractive effort: 280 kN (62,950 lbf)
Career
- Operators: PKP
- Class: EU07
- Nicknames: Siódemka
- Delivered: 1965

The PKP class EU07 (designated by Pafawag as the Pafawag 4E and HCP 303E) is the name for a Polish electric locomotive in service on Polish State Railways. It is designed as a mixed-traffic locomotive, and as such is used both in freight and passenger traffic, most notably PKP Intercity.

== Technical data ==
EU07s have driving cabs at each end of the locomotive. The locomotive is equipped with multiple unit control system, which allows a single driver to drive two coupled engines from one cab. This engine is able to pull passenger trains of up to 650-tonne (640-long-ton; 720-short-ton) weight with speed of 125 km/h (78 mph) and freight trains of up to 2,000 t (2,000 long tons; 2,200 short tons) weight with speed of 70 km/h (43 mph). These figures apply to driving on level track.

== History ==
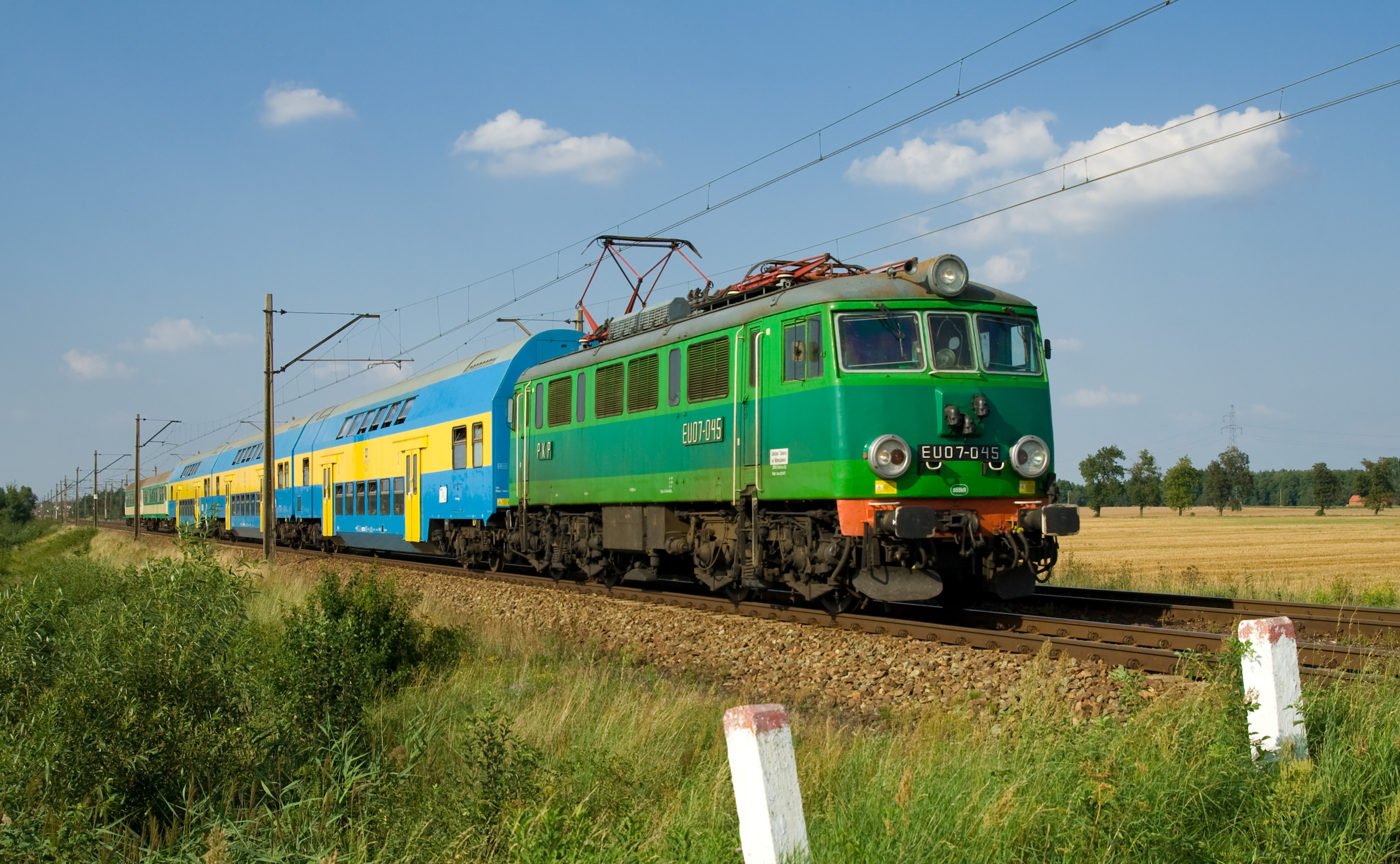
EU07 running passenger service, 2007

The EU07 is strongly connected with the EU06 locomotive. The EU06 was a Polish derivative of the Class 83 locomotive built for the British system. In 1959 an agreement was signed with the producer of the EU06, English Electric, under which Poland bought the license for the EU06 and started its production in Pafawag Wrocław, under build number 4E. The first item was finished in 1965, and by 1974 a total number of 240 locomotives had been built. The EU07 locomotives differed slightly from EU06 due to some minor improvements that had been made in comparison to their predecessors.

In 1983 the production of EU07 locomotives was re-opened in Cegielski works in Poznań. This new series of locomotives was based on ET41 freight locomotive (which had been built by joining together two EU07 locomotives of first-run production). Bringing several modifications production number changed to 303E. A total number of 243 locomotives were built and the production continued until 1994 despite relatively outdated construction.

=== Modifications ===
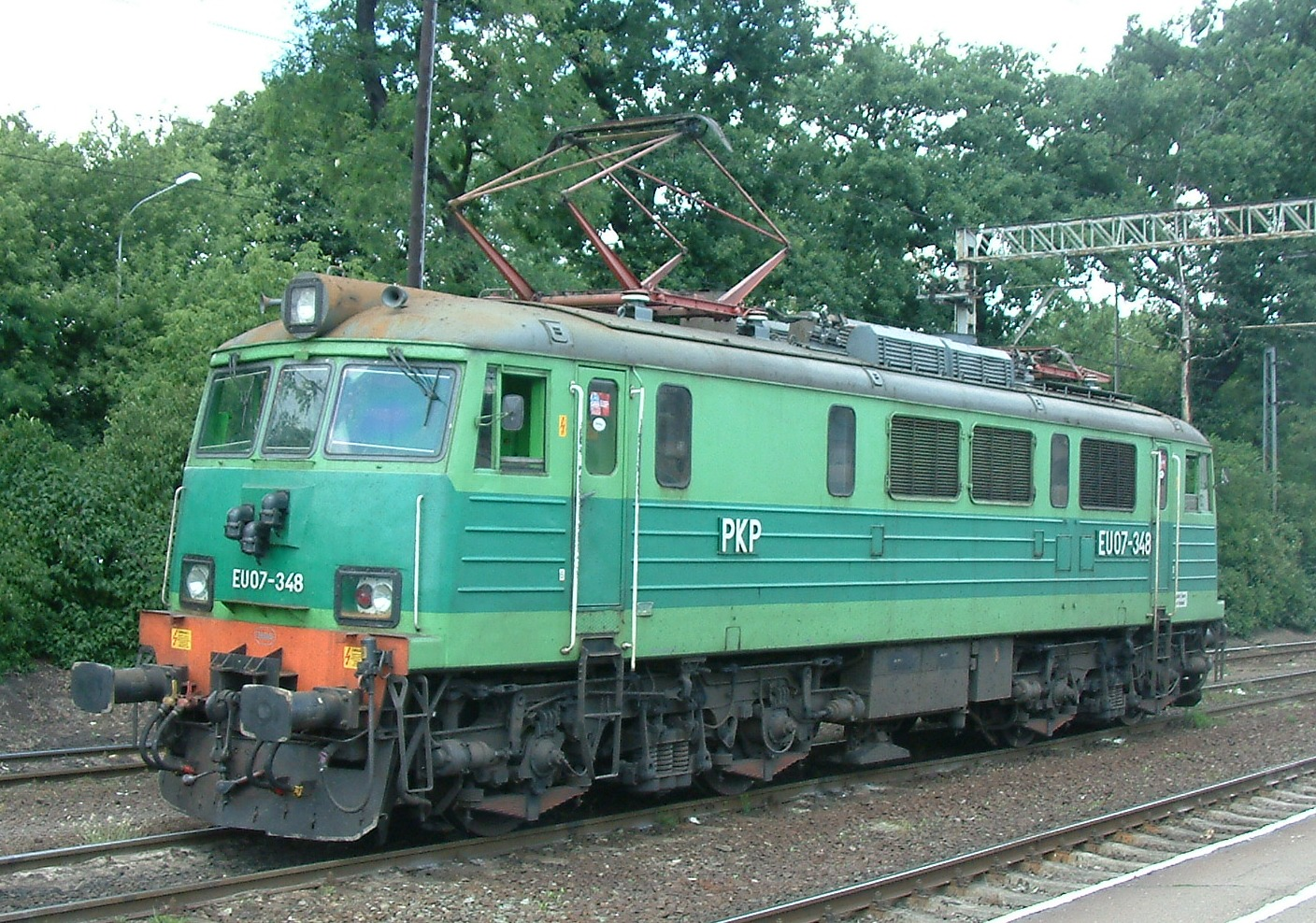
EU07-348 in Poznań

All EU07 locomotives were originally fitted with large headlights, called the buckets. After 1990 these have been successively replaced with halogen headlights of smaller diameter. The easiest (and cheapest) way was to put the new headlights inside the "buckets". More elaborate changes included removing the "buckets" and mounting the headlights flush with the body panels for better aerodynamic performance.

EP07 is a later modification of EU07, with changed motors and gear ratios to make them better suited for hauling passenger trains. Modifications have been made in several Rolling Stock Repairing Works since 1995. EP07 locomotives retained their original fleet numbers.

EU07A is a very comprehensive modification of EU07 encompassing new motors, power electronics, a new brake system, etc. Originally, after evaluating test results, PKP Intercity made a decision not to modify any further units due to unsatisfactory costs versus results ratio but in 2012 ordered further two units. These were delivered in 2014. Further 6 units were to be modified for Polregio but the plans were shelved. In 2020 PKP Intercity signed contract for modification of further 20 EU07s to the EU07A standard.

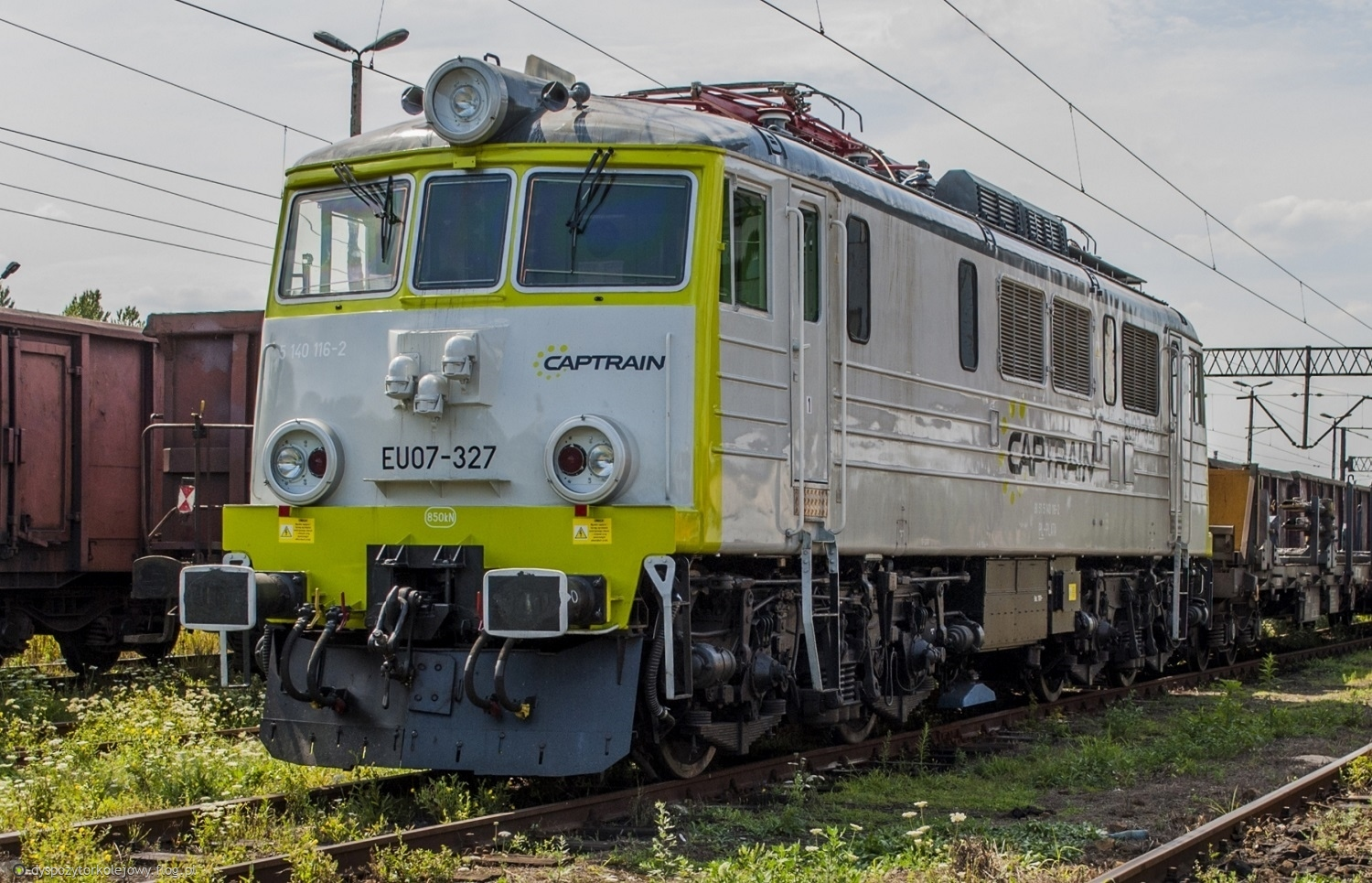
EU07-327 in service with Captrain Polska

=== Related developments ===
The following engines are heavily based on EU07:

- ET22 — heavy goods engine using pneumatics, electrics and motors of EU07
- EP08 — increased V_{max} thanks to different motors and powertrains
- ET41 — articulated twin engine consisting of 2 permanently coupled EU07

== Accidents ==
On 12 August 2011, locomotive number 1034 derailed at Baby, Piotrków County whilst hauling a passenger train from Warszawa Centralna to Katowice. Two passengers were killed and 81 were injured.

== Nicknames ==
- Siódemka (The Seven) — from the number
- Ełka

== See also ==
- Polish locomotives designation
