= PKP Cargo =

Polish rail freight carrier

PKP Cargo SA

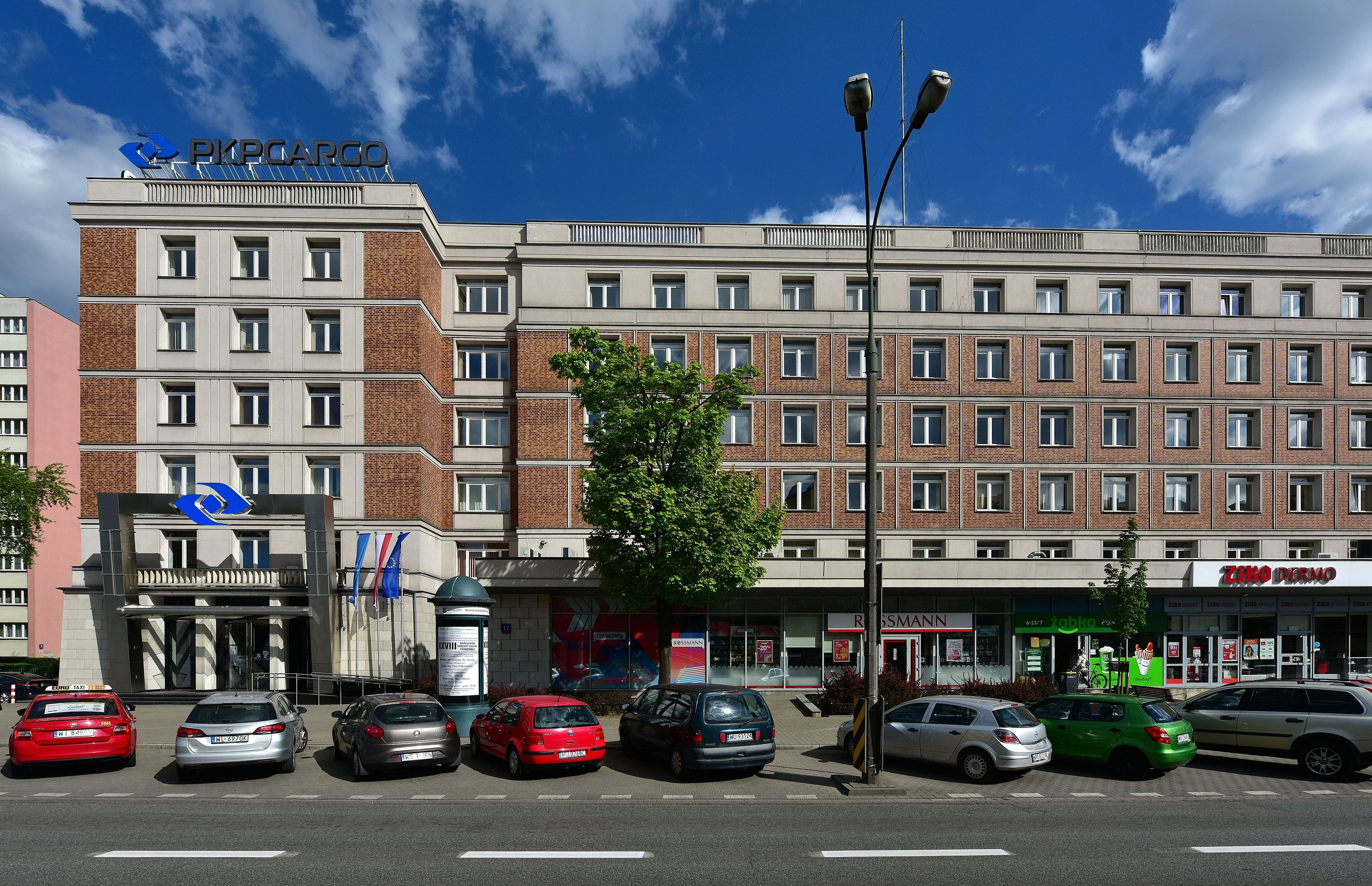
- Company headquarters in Warsaw
- Type: Spółka Akcyjna
- Traded as: WSE: PKP
- ISIN: PLPKPCR00011
- Industry: Rail transport
- Founded: 2001; 25 years ago
- Headquarters: Warsaw, Poland
- Key people: Zbigniew Prus (President of the Management Board); Bogusław Nadolnik (President of the supervisory board)
- Services: Forwarding; Logistics; Rail freight transport Railway siding management Rolling stock maintenance Transshipment
- Revenue: 4759.6 million zł ▲ (2017)
- Net income: 81.7 million zł ▲ (2017)
- Total assets: 4688 million zł ▼ (2017)
- Number of employees: 21,210 (2022)
- Website: www.pkpcargo.com

PKP Cargo (WSE: PKP) is a logistics operator and a part of the PKP Group in Poland. It is the largest railway freight carrier in Poland and second largest in the European Union. PKP Cargo is listed on the Warsaw Stock Exchange. The company's largest shareholder is PKP S.A. with a 33,01% share.

PKP Cargo does not have bankruptcy capacity (as it is an entity established by law).

== History ==
In 2000, PKP Cargo was spun off from Polskie Koleje Państwowe, the Polish state railways. Since 1 October 2001, PKP Cargo has been a member of PKP S.A. Group. In 2009, the company was awarded the Safety Certificate – Part A, which confirmed the approval of its safety management system in the European Union, and in 2010, it obtained the Safety Certificate – Part B.

== Field structure in Poland ==
Since June 2014, PKP Cargo has been operating through seven divisions:

- Northern Division (Zakład Północny) – based in Gdynia
- Southern Division (Zakład Południowy) – based in Katowice
- Eastern Division (Zakład Wschodni) – based in Lublin
- Central Division (Zakład Centralny) – based in Warsaw
- Western Division (Zakład Zachodni) – based in Poznań
- Silesia Division (Zakład Śląski) – based in Tarnowskie Góry
- Lower Silesia Division (Zakład Dolnośląski) – based in Wrocław

Beforehand, after the year 2001, the structure of the company was modified several times. The new territorial division is expected to streamline management performance and deliver more than PLN 10 million in savings annually.

== Rail freight ==
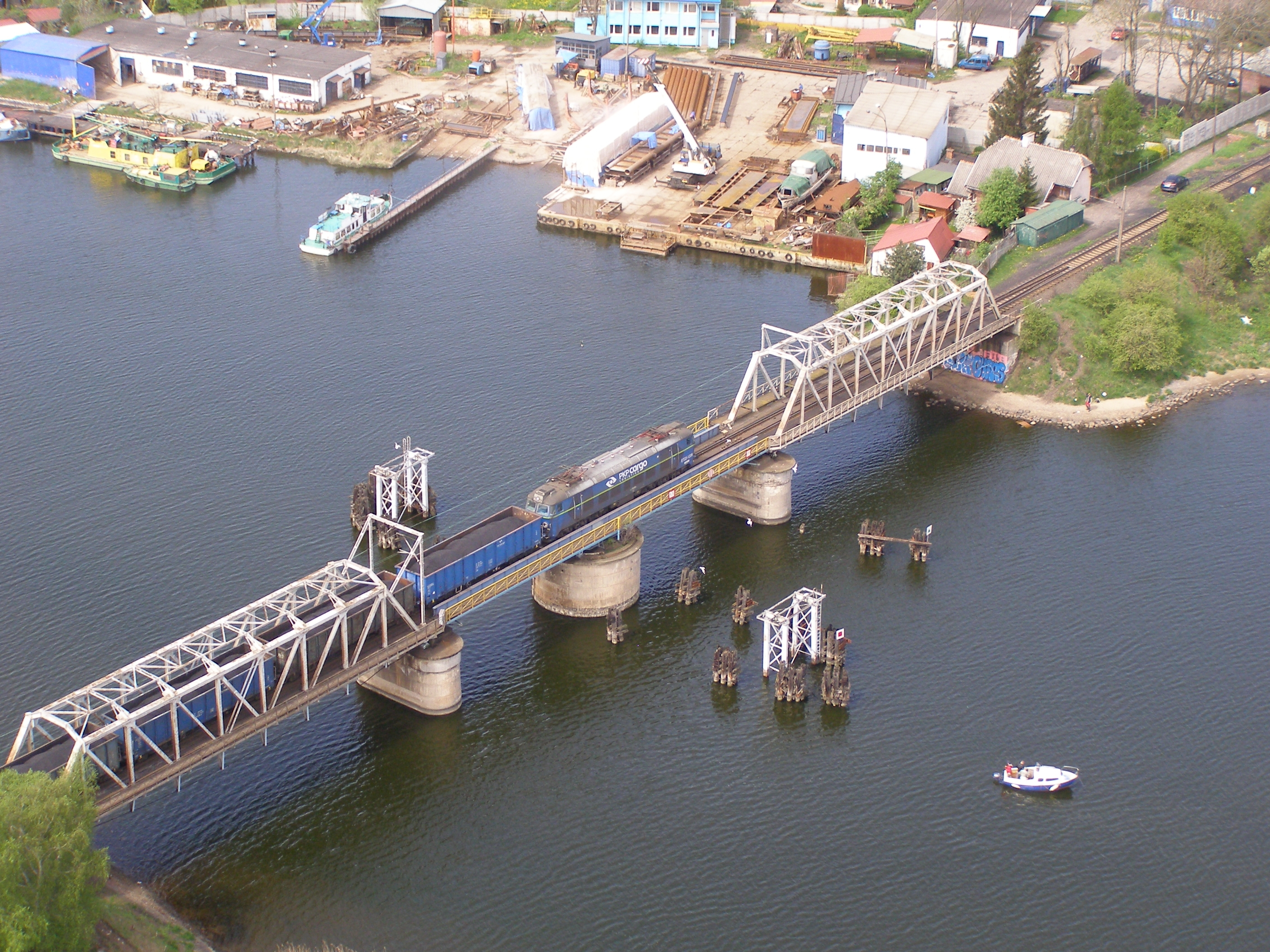
PKP Cargo train hauling cars with coal in Gdańsk, North Poland

=== Poland ===
The core activity of PKP Cargo is rail freight transport. The company is the largest carrier in Poland – in 2013, PKP Cargo had a 59.2% share in the Polish market by transport performance (30.1 billion tkm) and 49.1% by weight (114.4 million tonnes). The major goods carried by PKP Cargo are: coal (39% of transport performance in 2013), aggregates and construction materials (18% of transport performance in 2013), ores and metals (15% of transport performance in 2013) and intermodal services (6% of transport performance in 2013). PKP Cargo cooperates with the largest Polish and global industrial groups representing the mining (coal, copper), steel and metallurgy sectors.

=== Other countries ===
Apart from Poland, PKP Cargo carries out rail freight operations using its own rolling stock in 8 other countries of the European Union: Germany, Czech Republic, Slovakia, Austria, Belgium, the Netherlands, Hungary and Lithuania (on the standard gauge part of the infrastructure). The company has access to main Polish and European seaports, such as Gdańsk, Gdynia, Szczecin, Świnoujście, Amsterdam, Rotterdam, Zeebrugge, Antwerp, Hamburg and Bremerhaven. In the first quarter of 2014, freight transport in Poland accounted for 47% of all services provided by PKP Cargo in terms of transport performance, while import, export and transit services – for 22%, 23% and 8%, respectively. Most of the company's international operations terminate in countries bordering Poland. As regards the structure of income from international customers, in the first quarter of 2014, 31% of income was received from Germany, 18% from the Czech Republic and 12% from Slovakia.

== The PKP Cargo Corporate Group ==
Member companies of PKP Cargo Corporate Group provide services in the area of inland and maritime transport, logistics, forwarding, transshipment, repairs of rolling and tractive stock, as well as railway siding management. Subsidiaries under the direct control of PKP Cargo:

- PKP CARGOTABOR – (100% controlled by PKP Cargo) is specialised in maintenance and repairs of rolling stock
- PKP CARGOLOK – (100% controlled by PKP Cargo) is specialised in repairs of locomotives. In June 2014, the company's assets were acquired by PKP CARGOTABOR
- CARGOTOR – (100% controlled by PKP Cargo) is specialised in the maintenance and provision to railway undertakings of logistics and service infrastructure
- PKP CARGO CL MAŁASZEWICZE – (100% controlled by PKP Cargo) the company provides transshipment and forwarding services, as well as border services for foreign trade operations in the area of rail and road transport
- PKP Cargo CL MEDYKA-ŻURAWICA – (100% controlled by PKP Cargo) provides services for trade, mainly between the European Union and Ukraine or Russia. It features terminals at the interface between the 1,435 mm (4 ft 8 1/2 in) standard gauge and 1,520 mm (4 ft 11 27/32 in) broad gauge systems. The company provides logistics services combining road, rail, air, inland waterway and maritime transport
- CARGOSPED – (100% controlled by PKP Cargo) a logistics operator providing forwarding and logistics services for transport operations in Poland and abroad
- PKP CARGO SERVICE – (100% controlled by PKP Cargo) provides comprehensive railway siding services, including infrastructure maintenance, and runs niche rail operations
- PS TRADE TRANS – (55.56% controlled by PKP Cargo) an international logistics operator providing services in the area of transport, transshipment and storage of goods as well as customs services
- PKP CARGO INTERNATIONAL – (51% controlled by PKP Cargo) a railway undertaking and freight forwarder in the CEE region. The company is now under liquidation

Subsidiaries under the indirect control of PKP Cargo:

- CARGOSPED TERMINAL BRANIEWO – (100% controlled) one of the largest transshipment terminals in the Braniewo area. The company's core activities include transshipment of various goods and trading in coal
- TRADE TRANS FINANCE – (100% controlled) a company providing financial and accounting services
- PPHU UKPOL sp. z o.o. – (75% controlled) a company providing transport and transshipment services
- TRANSGAZ S.A. – (63.97% controlled) the company is engaged in transshipment of liquefied gas and petrochemicals which need heating (such as paraffin, waxes, some oils)
- TRADE TRANS KARYA sp. z o.o. – (60.3% controlled) the company runs a transshipment terminal, customs warehouse and a break-of-gauge transshipment facility in Wola Baranowska. It provides freight transshipment services

Subsidiaries jointly controlled by PKP Cargo or its subsidiaries:

- CARGOSPED SKŁADY CELNE sp. z o.o. (50% controlled)
- TP SŁAWKÓW MEDYKA sp. z o.o. (50% controlled)
- PKP CARGO CFL INTERNATIONAL S.A. (50% controlled, now under liquidation)

PKP Cargo Corporate Group includes also several other companies with a minority share held by PKP Cargo or its subsidiaries.

== Warsaw Stock Exchange ==
On 30 October 2013, PKP Cargo was floated on the Warsaw Stock Exchange. With its IPO, the company became the first stock-listed rail freight operator in Europe. The first transaction of the initial session closed at PLN 80.2, 17.9% above the IPO price (PLN 68). On the first day of listing, PKP Cargo share price closed at PLN 81.16, 19.4% more than the IPO price. The company itself did not obtain any receipts from Warsaw Stock Exchange float, as only shares held by PKP S.A., representing 50% of all stock, were on offer. In June 2014, PKP S.A. sold another block of shares of PKP Cargo. PKP Cargo's investors include top Polish and global financial institutions. As at 13 August 2014, the ownership structure of PKP Cargo was as follows: PKP S.A. – 33.01%, ING OFE – 10.58%, Morgan Stanley – 5.31%, Aviva OFE – 5.22%, EBRD – 5.1%, other shareholders – 40.77%.

== Rolling stock ==
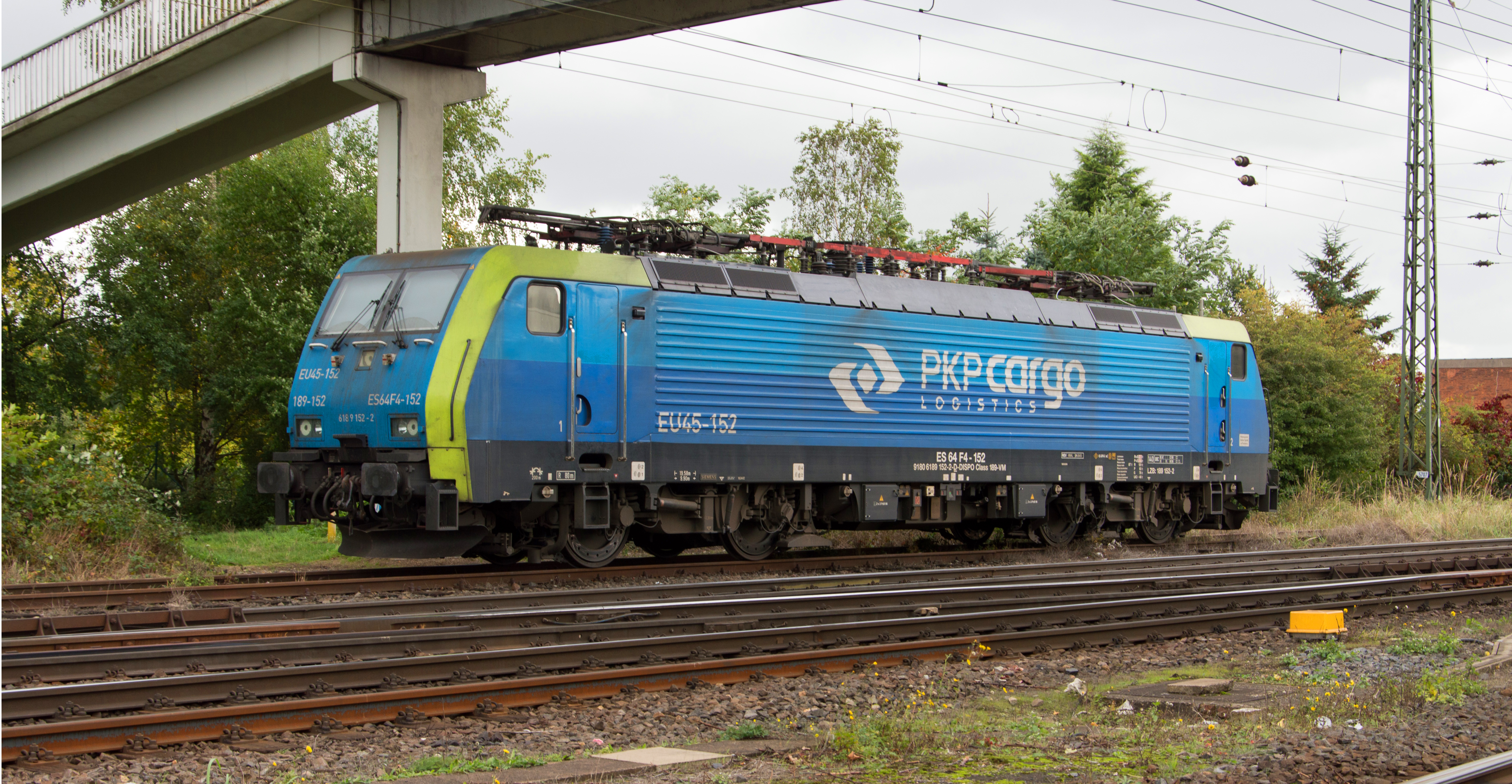
EU45 Locomotive with the PKP Cargo painting

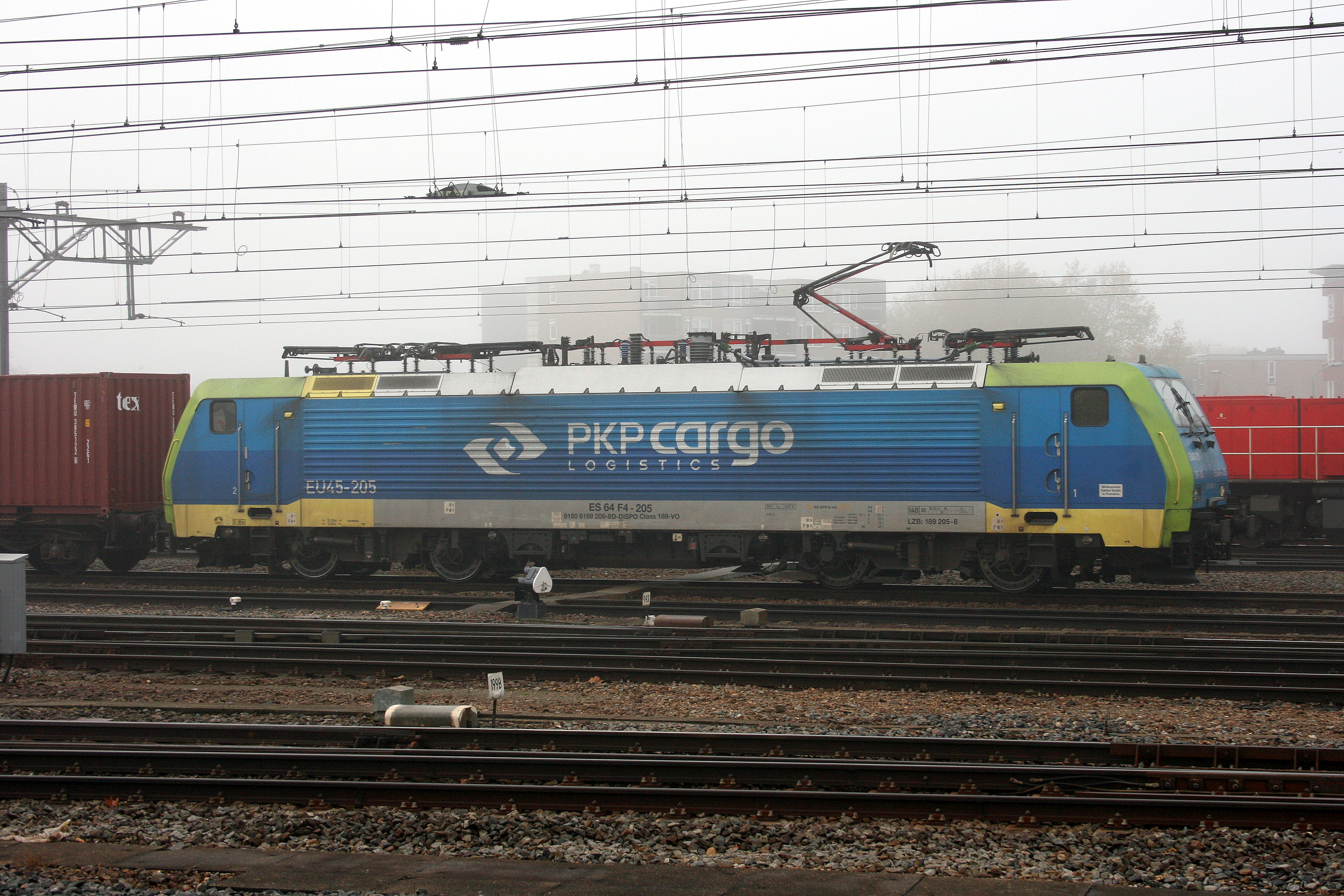
PKP Cargo locomotive hauling containers in Venlo, Netherlands

=== Locomotives ===
PKP Cargo owns more than 2,300 locomotives and uses more than 1,300 of them. Some of PKP Cargo's locomotives have entered into service abroad. The company runs independent operations, for instance in Germany, the Czech Republic, Austria, Slovakia, Belgium, the Netherlands, using Siemens EuroSprinter multi-system locomotives. Electric locomotives: ET22 and ET41 and diesel locomotives: ST44, ST45 and SM42 have also entered into service in the Czech and Slovak railway networks. All PKP Cargo locomotives currently in use, with the exception of multi-system Siemens locomotives, are equipped with GPS devices.

=== Wagons ===
PKP Cargo owns more than 62,500 wagons, of which more than 44,000 are currently in use. Mineral wagons (approx. 28,000), carrying bulk materials (coal, ores, crushed stone), farm produce (beetroot, potatoes), as well as other goods, such as timber, machinery and equipment, account for a major part of the rolling stock. The second most numerous group at PKP Cargo are flat wagons. PKP Cargo uses them to carry containers, metal products, vehicles, machinery, timber etc. In addition, the company has ordinary and special covered vans, wagons with opening roofs and special wagons which can carry, for instance, heavy industrial goods exceeding loading gauge limits, as well as heavy electrical equipment.

=== Rolling stock repairs and maintenance ===
PKP Cargotabor, a member company of PKP Cargo Corporate Group, provides locomotive and wagon maintenance services. PKP Cargotabor employs approximately 2,800 people and is one of the largest companies of its type in Europe. PKP Cargotabor was established in mid-2014 as a result of the consolidation of rolling stock companies within PKP Cargo Corporate Group. According to representatives of the PKP Cargo management board, while in 2014 almost all of the orders executed by PKP Cargotabor have been placed by PKP Cargo Corporate Group, the company is expected to provide services to third parties in the future. On 15 December 2014, company representatives announced that they were considering the launch of freight cargo manufacturing operations.

== Terminals ==
PKP Cargo operates 25 transshipment terminals at key locations in Poland. Six of them are located close to the eastern border. PKP Cargo owns two specialised logistics centres: Małaszewicze, near the border with Belarus, and Medyka-Żurawica, close to the border with Ukraine. Additionally, PKP Cargo runs container terminals in Gliwice, Kobylnica, Mława and Warsaw, among others. The latest PKP Cargo's intermodal investment project is the Poznań-Franowo terminal. It is the largest freight station in Wielkopolska, the size of its yard reaching 20 thousand square metres, and the track system totalling 1,570 running metres in length. The annual transshipment capacity of the Franowo terminal is estimated at 60,000 TEU.

== Sidings ==
PKP Cargo Group operates more than 30 railway sidings for a dozen or so customers in six Provinces of Poland. They include the largest companies on the Polish and European mining, steel processing and power generation markets. The number of sidings handled by PKP Cargo keeps growing. Railway siding operations are carried out by PKP Cargo Service, a member company of PKP Cargo Group.

== Forwarding services ==
Within PKP Cargo Corporate Group, forwarding operations are carried out by PS Trade Trans. PS Trade Trans is an international logistics operator specialised in railway and road forwarding. Aside from that, it offers transshipment and customs services. As part of its operations, Trade Trans offers rail forwarding services (using its own rolling stock), road forwarding services, maritime and air transport arrangements, customs services (the company runs a network of 18 customs agencies in Poland and at the EU border), logistics in seaports and inland terminals, warehousing logistics, ferry transport, ferry services between Poland and Scandinavia, oversized and heavy cargo operations, as well as services for non-standard and complex projects. The company was involved in the deliveries of materials for the construction of the National Stadium in Warsaw and the European Solidarity Centre in Gdańsk.

== Intermodal ==
Cargosped sp. z o.o. is a PKP Cargo Corporate Group company responsible for intermodal operations. The company sets up logistic chains which involve rail transport. Aside from typical logistics solutions (just in time, door to door, on place on time), Cargosped is specialised in extraordinary consignments that can be troublesome in transport due to shape, size or weight and require special technologies or transport arrangements. PKP Cargo declares that intermodal operations are its strategic business segment. The company is a leader in intermodal operations in Poland, with a 52% market share after Q3 2014 by transport performance. After three quarters of 2014, intermodal services accounted for 7% of the transport performance of PKP Cargo Corporate Group. In autumn 2013, PKP Cargo bought 330 new 80-ft container flat wagons. In December 2013, PKP Cargo put one of its largest terminals into service at the Poznań-Franowo station. The investment cost the company PLN 25 million.

== Other information ==
PKP Cargo owns the Parowozownia Wolsztyn museum, Skansen taboru kolejowego (rolling stock museum) in Chabówka and operates vintage steam trains on selected routes. The company offers trips and events for railway enthusiasts. Since 27 April 2011, it has been the sponsor of Pogoń Lwów. In August 2014, the company started cooperation with two other football clubs in Poland: Ruch Chorzów and Zagłębie Sosnowiec. In December 2014, PKP Cargo signed a cooperation agreement with the Białystok University of Technology.

On December 30, 2014, representatives of PKP Cargo has signed an agreement on acquisition of an 80% stake in Advanced World Transport (AWT), the second largest rail freight operator in the Czech Republic. If the agreement comes into effect, PKP Cargo will increase its share in the Czech market to approx. 10%. PKP Cargo has also signed a stakeholder agreement with Minezit SE, a Czech company that owns the remaining 20% of shares in AWT. The agreement provides among others conditions for a potential acquisition of the remaining 20% stake in AWT by PKP Cargo in the future.

== See also ==
- Transportation in Poland
- List of railway companies
- Polish locomotives designation
- PKP Group
