= PKP class ET41 =

Class of Polish electric locomotive

ET41
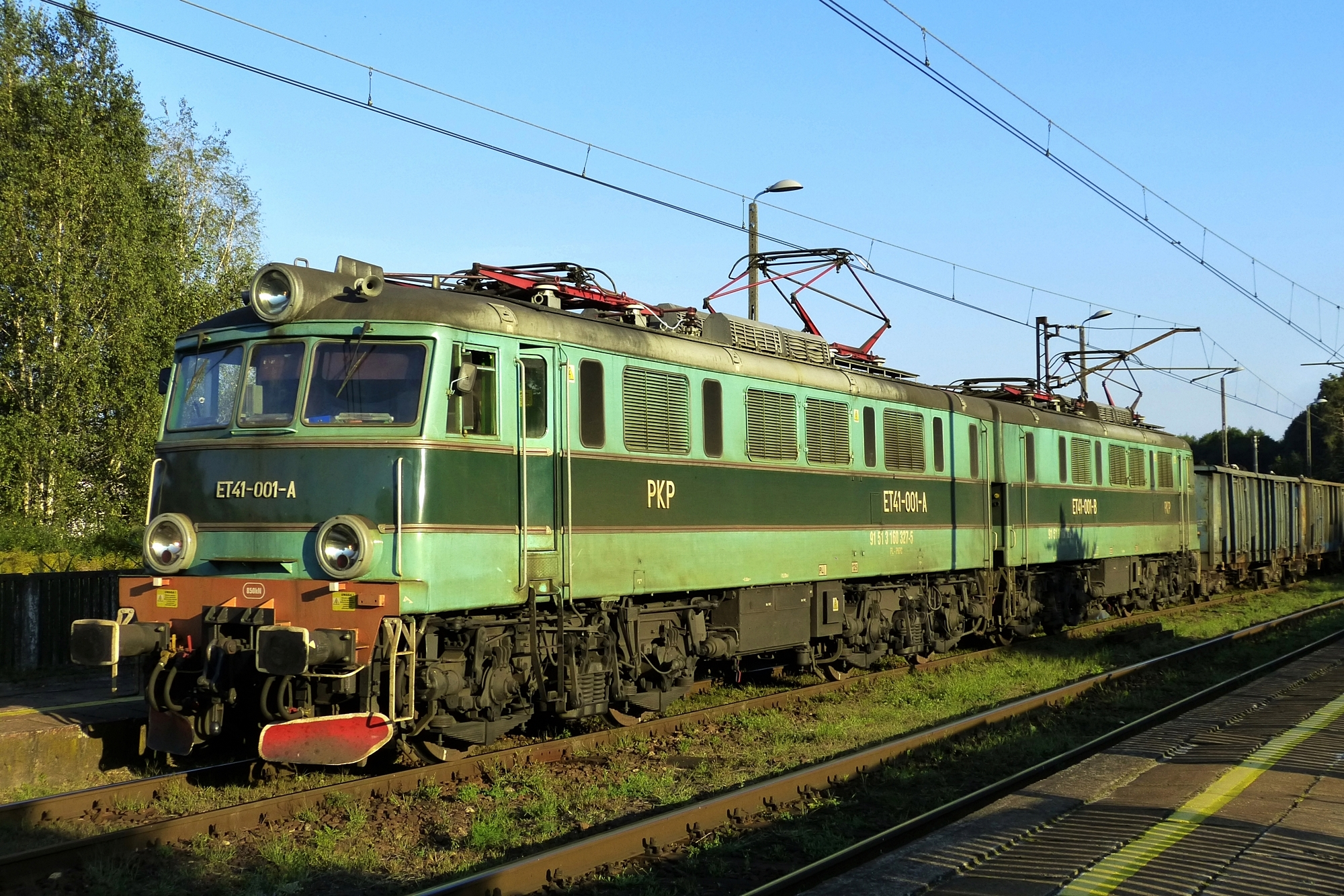
- ET41-001 of PKP Cargo in Raszowa, 15 September 2016
Type and origin
- Power type: Electric
- Builder: H. Cegielski - Poznań S.A.
- Build date: 1977–1983
Specifications
- Configuration
  - AAR: B-B+B-B
  - UIC: Bo′Bo′+Bo′Bo′
- Gauge: 1,435 mm (4 ft 8 1/2 in) standard gauge
- Wheel diameter: 1,250 mm (49.21 in)
- Length: 31,860 mm (104 ft 6 3/8 in)
- Width: 3,038 mm (9 ft 11 5/8 in)
- Height: 4,343 mm (14 ft 3 in)
- Loco weight: 167 t (164 long tons; 184 short tons)
- Electric system/s: 3 kV DC Catenary
- Current pickup: Pantograph
- Traction motors: EE 541B
- Transmission: 79:18
- Loco brake: Oerlikon
- Train brakes: Oerlikon
- Safety systems: SHP
Performance figures
- Maximum speed: 125 km/h (78 mph)
- Power output: 4,000 kW (5,400 hp)
- Tractive effort: 500 kN (110,000 lbf)
Career
- Operators: PKP
- Nicknames: Bolek i Lolek, Łamaniec, Tandem, Jamnik (Dachshund)

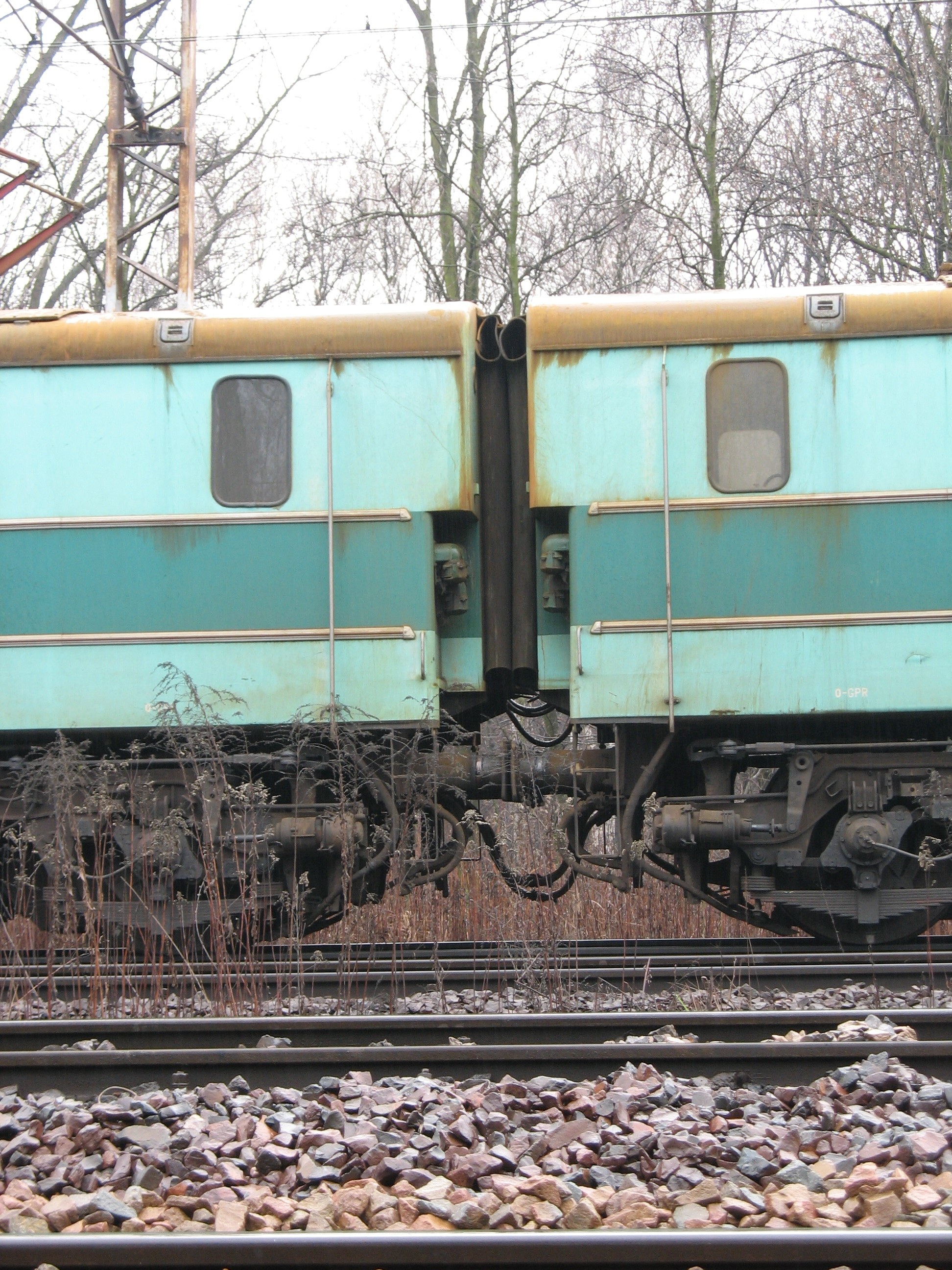
The articulated join in ET41-104

ET41 (manufacturer's designation: HCP 203E) is the name for a Polish electric locomotive used by the Polish railway operator (PKP). Three such locomotives were briefly rented to the Croatian Railways between 1995 and 1996 and were given the designation HŽ series 1081 there.

== History ==
ET41 is a modification of the EU07 locomotive, and was designed for the purpose of heavy cargo transport. It is made of two connected bodies of EU07, minus the cabs at the inner ends.

=== Introduction ===
The design for this machine was ready in 1976. Basically it consists of two EU07 locomotives but with two driver's cabs removed. Two locos are semi-permanently coupled in multiple operation. Because of this, the current collection must be done independently for each section.

=== Production ===
Production started in 1977 and continued until 1983. A total number of 200 double-locomotives were produced.

Locomotives numbers	Producer	Years of production	Quantity
001 - 200	Cegielski Poznań	1977–1983	200

=== Notable events ===
For some time number 100 carried a special white-red livery and was used on the special PZPR (Polish communist party) trains.

Half-locomotives 036B, 088A and 116A have been rebuilt as PKP EU07-537, EU07-544 and PKP EU07-545 respectively. This has required cabs to be built at the back end.

=== Present day ===
ET41 are mainly used for coal transport from Upper Silesia to the ports of Gdańsk, Gdynia and Szczecin. Seldom are those locomotives used for hauling passenger trains. In 2016, PKP Cargo decided to send some ET41 locomotives for major repair and modernization to Ostrów Wielkopolski. The locomotives received overhauled electrical equipment, bogies, and traction motors, as well as revamped driver's cabs. The first locomotive to be modernized, ET41-006, was shown off on 14 October 2016.

== See also ==
- Polish locomotives designation
