= Pafawag =

Polish locomotive manufacturer

Pafawag (Państwowa Fabryka Wagonów; lit. 'National Rail Carriage Factory') is a Polish locomotive manufacturer based in Wrocław. The company became part of Adtranz in 1997 as Adtranz Pafawag, and in 2001 part of Bombardier Transportation.

== History ==
The factory opened in 1833 as Linke-Hofmann-Werke, Breslau, and became one of the major production centres for rolling stock in Europe.

By the end of the Second World War most of the factory had been destroyed, and after the war the city of Breslau became part of Poland.

In 1953 the company was renamed Pafawag.

In 1953 the company produced the EP-02, the first Polish electric locomotive manufactured after World War II.

In the late 1980s to mid 1990s the company experienced increasing economic problems due to lack of orders causing loss of production and lower employment.

In 1997 ABB DaimlerBenz Transportation (ADtranz) acquired a majority share in the company. The Adtranz group (DaimlerChrysler Rail Systems after 1999) was bought by Bombardier Transportation in 2001; the Wroclaw plant was merged with another Bombardier owned plant based in Łódź to form Bombardier Transportation Polska Sp. z o.o. The plant manufactures the bodyshells of Bombardier locomotives as well as other sub-components for the Bombardier Transportation group.

In 2015 Bombardier contracted Panattoni Europe to construct an additional 18,357 square metres (197,590 sq ft) manufacturing hall, initially to be used for the construction of Deutsche Bahn's ICx trains.

== Products ==
The main products:

- locomotives
- bodies
- frames
- running gear for locomotives

Pafawag was the producer of first Polish modern "fast locomotive" EP09.

=== Pafawag types ===
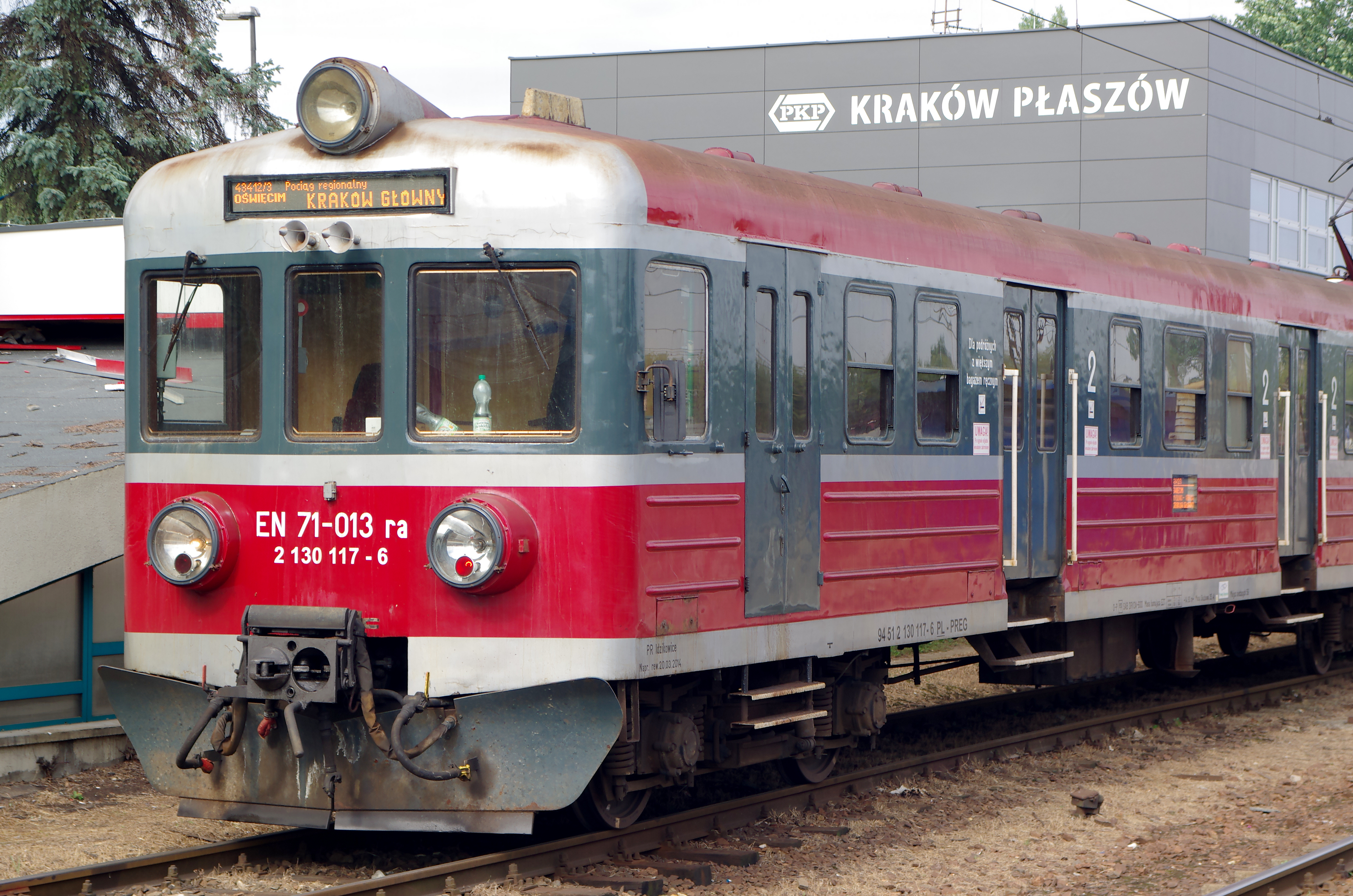
EN71

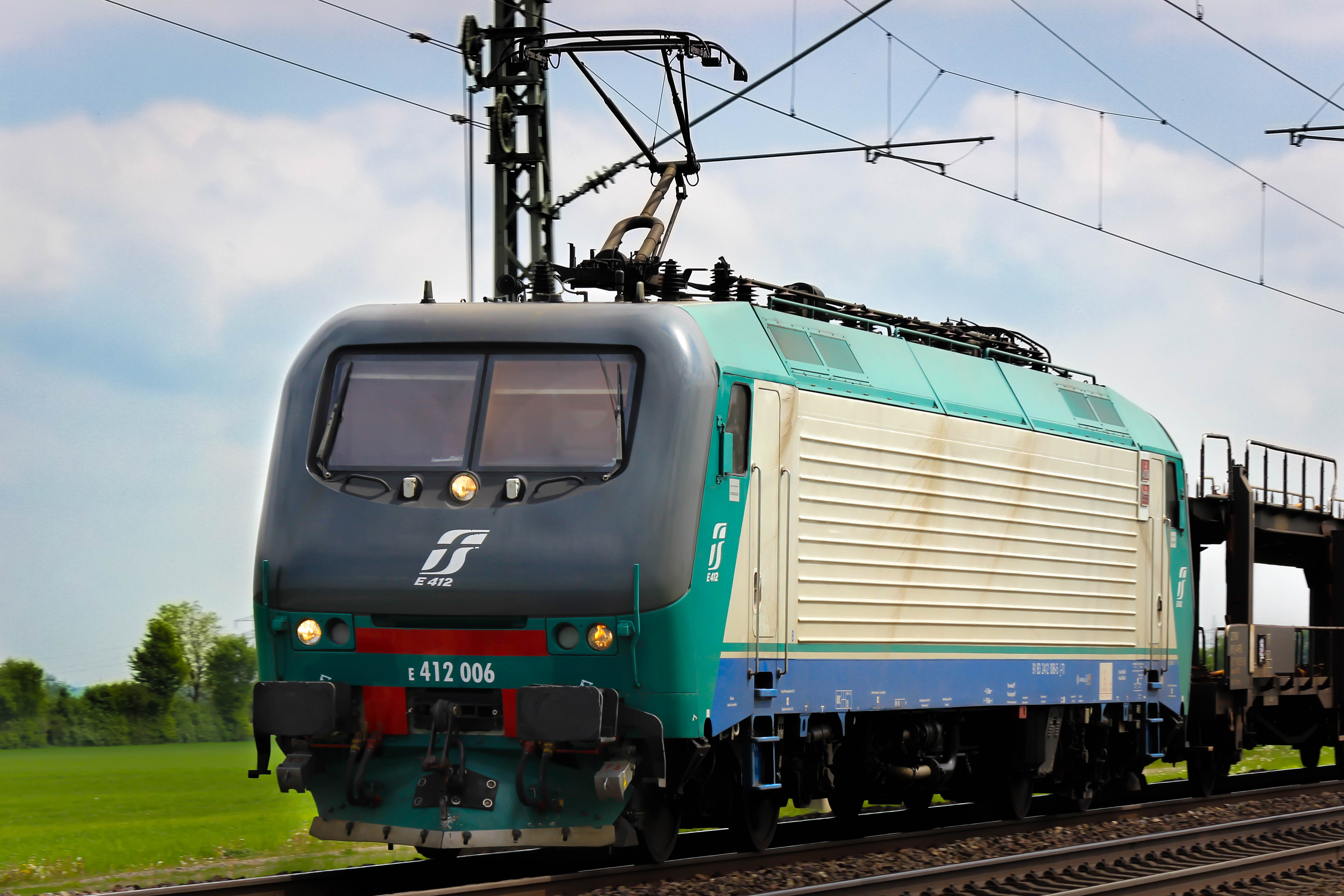
EU43

EP09

Type	PKP type	Years	Produced
1E	EP02	1953–1956	8
2E	–	1954–1956	9
1B/2B	EW53	1954–1956	20
3E	ET21	1957–1971	658
3Aw	Bxhpi	1958-1960	600
3B/4B	EW55	1958–1962	72
5B/6B	EN57	1962–1994	1429
EU07	EU07	1965–1977	240
101N	EN94	1969–1972	40
201E	ET22	1969–1989	1184
102E	EP08	1972–1976	15
201Ea	EP23	1973	1
3WE	EW58	1974–1980	28
5Bg/6Bg	EN71	1976	20
104E	EP09	1986–1997	47
6WE	EW60	1990	2
5Bs/6Bs	ED72	1993–1996	21
112E	EU43	1996–1998	28

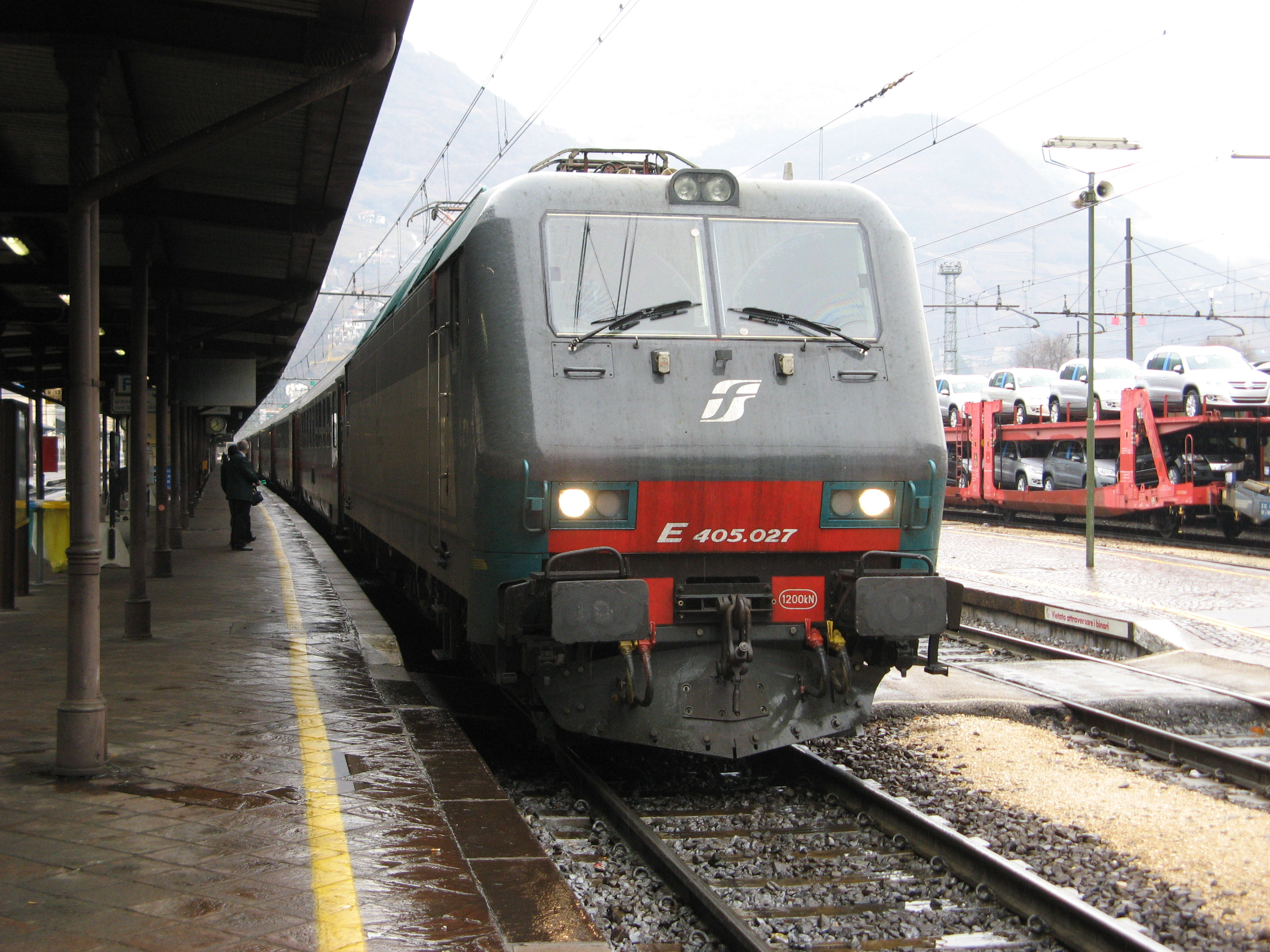
EU11

=== Adtranz-Pafawag types ===
PKP type	Years	Produced
ED73	1997	1
EU11	1998-2002	42

== See also ==
- Linke-Hofmann
