= List of PKP locomotives and multiple units =

This is a list of Locomotives of the Polish State Railways.

== Steam locomotives ==
=== Locomotives of Norddeucher lloyd origin ===
==== Passenger locomotives ====
Class	Origin	UIC class	Quantity (Note: “Dz” denotes locomotives owned by the Free City of Danzig)	Year(s)	Quantity	Year(s)	Withdrawn	Notes
Class	Origin	UIC class	in 1926		in 1946		Withdrawn	Notes
Pd1	Prussian S 3	2′B n2v	89 + 3 Dz	1892–1905	18	1892–1907	to 1951	
Pd2	Prussian S 4	2′B h2	6	1906	—	—	in use until 1939	
Pd4	Prussian S 5^{2}	2′B n2v	29	1906–1911	14	1901–1910	to 1955	
Pd5	Prussian S 6	2′B n2v	79 + 2 Dz	1906–1913	37	1907–1913	to 1958	
Pf1	Prussian S 7	2′B1′ n4v	7	1904–1906	—	—	before 1936	Hanomag version
Pf2	Prussian S 7	2′B1 n4v	3	1905	—	—	before 1936	Grafenstaden version
Pk1	Prussian S 10	2′C h4	31	1911–1914	24	1911–1914	to 1958	
Pk2	Prussian S 10^{1}	2′C h4v	20	1911–1916	42	1911–1915	to 1959	1911 and 1914 versions
Pk3	Prussian S 10^{2}	2′C h3	1	1914	—	—	in use until 1939	
Pm2	DRG Class 03	2′C1′ h2	—	—	34 + 1	1931–1936	to 1978	
Pm3	DRB Class 03^{10}	2′C1′ h3	—	—	9	1939–1940	to 1968	
Pt1	Prussian P 10	1′D1′ h3	—	—	11	1923–1924	1956*	*Returned to DR
Oc1	Prussian P 3^{1}	1B n2	13	1887–1895	—	—	before 1936	
Od1	Prussian P 4^{1}	2′B n2	21	1893–1900	—	—	to 1938	
Od2	Prussian P 4^{2}	2′B n2v	94 + 3 Dz	1898–1910	46	1898–1910	to 1958	
Od101	Saxon VIII V2	2′B n2v	1	1897	—	—	before 1931	
Od102	Württemberg AD	2′B n2v	1	1907	—	—	before 1931	
Oi1	Prussian P 6	1′C h2	44	1905–1909	31	1905–1910	to 1972	
Oi2	DRG Class 24	1′C h2	—	—	34	1928–1940	to 1976	
Ok1	Prussian P 8 + PKP order	2′C h2	255 + 2 Dz	1908–1923	429	1906–1923	In service	
Ok2	Saxon XII H2	2′C h2	—	—	5	1910–1922	to 1953	
Ot1	DRG Class 41	1′D1′ h2	—	—	19	1938–1940	to 1973	

==== Freight locomotives ====
Class	Origin	UIC class	Quantity	Year(s)	Quantity	Year(s)	Withdrawn	Notes
Class	Origin	UIC class	in 1926		in 1946		Withdrawn	Notes
Th1	Prussian G 3, WWB	C n2	118	1880–1895	—	—	In use until 1939	
Th2	Prussian G 4^{1}	C n2v	8	1883–1898	—	—	before 1936	
Th3	Prussian G 4^{2}	C n2v	103 + 8 Dz	1887–1900	1	1899	to 1948	
Th4	Prussian G 4^{3}	C n2v	10 + 5 Dz	1905–1907	—	—	in use until 1939	
Th101	Saxon V V	C n2v	9	1887–1900	—	—	to 1936	
Th102	Württemberg Fc	C n2v	19	1890–1909			before 1936	
Ti1	Prussian G 5^{1}	1′C n2	28	1893–1901			in use until 1939	
Ti2	Prussian G 5^{2}	1′C n2v	74	1897–1908	8	1899–1906	to 1954	
Ti3	Prussian G 5^{3}	1′C n2	16	1903–1905	1	1904	to 1952	
Ti4	Prussian G 5^{4}	1′C n2v	195 + 2 Dz	1901–1910	60	1899–1910	to 1957	
Ti101	Bavarian C VI, Bavarian G 3/4 N	1′C n2v	10	1900–1909	—	—	before 1936	
Tp1	Prussian G 7^{1}	D n2	142	1894–1917	99	1898–1917	to 1966	
Tp2	Prussian G 7^{2}	D n2v	295	1895–1911	91	1895–1911	to 1966	
Tp3	Prussian G 8	D h2	83	1905–1913	45	1906–1913	to 1970	
Tp4	Prussian G 8^{1} + PKP order	D h2	459 + 3 Dz	1913–1922	302	1913–1921	to 1972	
Tp5	Prussian G 9	D n2	7	1909–1911	—	—	to 1939	
Tr1	Prussian G 7^{3}	1′D n2v	23	1893–1917	—	—	?	
Tr3	Prussian G 8^{3}	1′D h3	—	—	16	1920	to 1955	
Tr5	DR Class 56^{2–8}	1′D h2	—	—	66	(1936–1941)	to 1972	Rebuilt from Prussian G 8^{1}
Tr6	Prussian G 8^{2}	1′D h2	—	—	52	1920–1924	to 1972	
Tr7	DR Class 56^{41}	1′D h2	—	—	4	1941	to 1972	
Tr101	Bavarian E I	1′D n2	1	1901	—	—	before 1936	
Tr102	Bavarian G 4/5 N	1′D n2	2	1906	—	—	before 1936	
Tw1	Prussian G 10, kukHB 680, PKP new build	E h2	85	1911–1922	141	1910–1924	to 1976	
Ty1	Prussian G 12, Saxon XIII H	1′E h3	1	1918	134	1918–1922	to 1970	
Ty2	DRB Class 52	1′E h2	—	—	1407	1942–1945	in service	
Ty3	DRB Class 42	1′E h2	—	—	3	1944	1952*	*reclassified as Ty43
Ty4	DRG Class 44	1′E h3	—	—	132	1937–1944	to 1978	
Ty5	DRG Class 50	1′E h2	—	—	55	1939–1944	to 1979	

==== Tank locomotives ====
Class	Origin	UIC class	Quantity	Year(s)	Quantity	Year(s)	Withdrawn	Notes
Class	Origin	UIC class	in 1926		in 1946		Withdrawn	Notes
OKd1	Prussian T 5^{2}	2'B n2t	1	1899	–	–	before 1966	
OKe1	Prussian T 5^{1}	1′B1′ n2t	5	1897–1904	—	—	in service until 1939	
OKi1	Prussian T 11	1′C n2t	52 + 4 Dz	1903–1908	52	1903–1910	to 1966	
OKi2	Prussian T 12	1′C h2t	12 + 6 Dz	1907–1916	84	1906–1921	to 1971	
OKl1	Prussian T 6	1′C1′ n3t	5	1902	—	—	to 1937	
OKl2	DRB Class 64	1′C1′ h2t	—	—	38	1928–1940	to 1973	
OKl101	Saxon XIV HT	1′C1′ h2t	11	1911–1917	1	1915	to 1949	
OKo1	Prussian T 18	2′C2′ h2t	—	—	29	1916–1924	to 1975	
TKb1	Prussian T 2	B n2t	1	1878	1	1878	to 1970	
TKh1	Prussian T 3	C n2t	24 + 4 Dz	1887–1905	23	1890–1909	to 1967	
TKh2	Prussian T 7	C n2t	27	1881–1892	—	—	before 1936	
TKh3	Saxon V T	C h2t	5	1906–1908	5	1899	before 1931	
TKh5	DRG Class 89^{0}	C n2t, C h2t			5	1934–1938	to 1954	
TKh101	Bavarian D II^{II}, Bavarian R 3/3	C n2t	4	1898–1907	—	—	before 1931	
TKi1	Prussian T 9^{1}	C1′ n2t	43 + 3 Dz	1894–1901	4	1901	to 1949	
TKi2	Prussian T 9^{2}	1′C n2t	18 + 4 Dz	1893–1899	10	1897–1899	to 1953	
TKi3	Prussian T 9^{3}	1′C n2t	310 + 10 Dz	1901–1914	236	1901–1914	to 1969	
TKp1	Prussian T 13	D n2t	43	1910–1916	94	1910–1924	to 1967	
TKt1	Prussian T 14	1′D1′ h2t	23 + 4 Dz	1915–1919	85	1914–1919	to 1972	
TKt2	Prussian T 14^{1}	1′D1′ h2t	6	1919–1921	68	1918–1923	to 1972	
TKt3	DRG Class 86	1′D1′ h2t	—	—	46	1928–1943	to 1975	
TKw1	Prussian T 16, Prussian T 16^{1}	E h2t	57 + 3 Dz	1907–1923	39	1907–1913	to 1970	Prussian T 16^{1} classified as TKw1 until 1939, as TKw2 after 1945
TKw2	Prussian T 16^{1}	E h2t			129	1913–1924	to 1976	
TKw3	Saxon XI HT, Industrial locomotives	E h2t	—	—	6	1913–1942	to 1976	

==== Narrow gauge locomotives ====
Class	Origin	UIC class	Quantity	Year(s)	Quantity	Year(s)	Withdrawn	Notes
Class	Origin	UIC class	in 1926		in 1946		Withdrawn	Notes
Tw3	Prussian T 39	E h2t						
Tw4	Prussian T 40	E h2t						
Tw29	Prussian T 40	E h2t						
Tx6	Prussian T 38	D h2t						
Tyy1	DRB Class 99^{164}	C′C′ h4t						

=== Locomotives of Austrian origin ===
Class	Origin	UIC class	Quantity	Manufacturer	Year(s)	Withdrawn	Notes
Pd12	kkStB 6	2′B	9	Floridsdorf, Wiener Neustadt, StEG	1894–1898		
Pd13	kkStB 106	2′B	8	Floridsdorf, Wiener Neustadt, StEG	1898–1902		
Pd14	kkStB 206	2′B	11	Floridsdorf, Wiener Neustadt, StEG, BMMF	1903–1907		
Pf12	kkStB 308	2′B	9	Wiener Neustadt	1895–1905		
Pn11	kkStB 210	1′C2′	9	Floridsdorf, BMMF	1908–1910		
Pn12	kkStB 310	1′C2′	15	Floridsdorf, Wiener Neustadt, BMMF, StEG, Breitfeld und Daněk	1911–1918		
Oc12	kkStB 24	1B		Sigl/Vienna, Wiener Neustadt	1868–1872		
Oc13	kkStB 19	1B	3	Wiener Neustadt (Sigl)	1870–1872	before 1926	
Od12	kkStB 2	2′B					
Od13	kkStB 4	2′B		Wiener Neustadt, Krauss, Floridsdorf, StEG			
Od14	kkStB 104	2′B	7	Wiener Neustadt, Krauss/Linz, Floridsdorf	1884–1893		
Oi101	kukHB 328	1’C h2					
OKl11	kkStB 29	1′C1′	9	BMMF, Floridsdorf	1912		
OKl12	kkStB 229	1′C1′	22	All Austrian locomotive manufacturers	1903–1920		
Ol11	kkStB 329	1′C1′	21	Floridsdorf, Wiener Neustadt, StEG, BMMF	1907–1909		
Ol12	kkStB 429	1′C1′	46+61	Floridsdorf, Wiener Neustadt, StEG	1909–1916		
Th16	kkStB 51	C		StEG, Wiener Neustadt, Floridsdorf	1871–1889		
Th17	kkStB 54	C		StEG, Wiener Neustadt, Borsig	1872–1885		
Th20	kkStB 56	C		Floridsdorf, Wiener Neustadt, StEG	1888–1900		
Th24	kkStB 59	C		All Austrian locomotive manufacturers	1893–1903		
Ti11	kkStB 260	1′C	62	Wiener Neustadt, Floridsdorf, StEG, BMMF	1893–1908		
Ti12	kkStB 60	1C		All Austrian locomotive manufacturers	1895–1910		
Ti16	kkStB 160	1C		Wiener Neustadt, BMMF	1909–1910		
TKh12	kkStB 97	C		All Austrian locomotive manufacturers	1878–1911		
TKh14	kkStB 394	C		Floridsdorf	1891–1903		
TKh17	kkStB 66	C	12	StEG	1898–1908		
TKp11	kkStB 178	D		Wiener Neustadt, Floridsdorf, BMMF	1899–1918		
TKp12	kkStB 278	D		Krauss/Linz	1909–1911		
TKp101	kkStB 278	D	10	Henschel/Kassel	1916–1917		
Tp15	kkStB 73	D	233	All Austrian locomotive manufacturers	1885–1909		
Tp17	kkStB 174	D	18	Floridsdorf, Wiener Neustadt, StEG, BMMF	1905–1915		
Tp106	kukHB 274	D n2					
Tr11	kkStB 170	1D		All Austrian locomotive manufacturers	1897–1919		
Tr12	kkStB 270	1D	253	Böhmisch-Mährische Maschinenfabrik, Breitfeld & Danek, ČKD, Adamov, Škoda, Wiener Neustadt, Floridsdorf	1917–1930		
Tw11	kkStB 180	E		Floridsdorf, Wiener Neustadt, StEG, BMMF	1901–1908		
Tw12	kkStB 180	E		Floridsdorf, Wiener Neustadt, StEG	1909–1915		

=== Locomotives from other railways ===
Class	Origin	UIC class	Quantity	Year(s)	Quantity	Year(s)	Withdrawn	Notes
Class	Origin	UIC class	in 1926		in 1946		Withdrawn	Notes
Oc2	WWB	1′B n2	7	1882–1885	—	—	before 1936	
OKa1	LVD class Tk	1′A1′ h2t	—	—	2	1931–1933	before 1978	
Ol103	MÁV Class 324	1′C1′ h2	4	1915–1916				originally classified as Tl103
Tp6	WWB Cz W/g	D n2						
Tp102	Russian O^{Д} (O^{D})	D n2v						Joy valve gear
Tp104	Russian O^{В} (O^{V})	D n2v						Walschaerts valve gear
Tp108	WWB Cz W/h	D h2						
Tp109	WWB Cz W/k	D h2						
Tr103	Russian Щ (Shch)	1′D n2v						

=== Locomotives purchased new by PKP ===
==== Standard gauge locomotives ====
PKP Class	UIC class	Quantity	Manufacturer	Year(s)	Withdrawn	Notes
Pm36	2′C1′ h2	2	Fablok	1937	to 1970	Both taken by DRB as 18 601 to 18 602 (1939–45)
Pt31	1′D1′ h2	98+12	Fablok	1932–1940	to 1980	last 12 delivered as DRB 39 1001 to 39 1012. A total of 80 taken by DRB as 19 101 to 19 180
Pt47	1′D1′ h2	180	Fablok, Cegielski	1947–1951	1988	Development of Pt31
Pu29	2′D1′ h2	3	Cegielski	1931	bis 1970	Two taken by DRB as 12 201 to 12 202
Ok22	2′C h2	190	Hanomag, Fablok	1923–1934	to 1979	130 taken by DRB as 38 4501 to 38 4630 (1939–45)
Ok55	2′C h2	(3)	Zakłady Naprawcze Taboru Kolejowego	(1952–1959)	to 1970	Rebuilt from Ok22 (chassis) und Tr203 (boiler); classified as Ok203 until 1958
OKl27	1′C1′ h2t	122	Cegielski	1928–1933	to 1979	120 taken by DRB as 75 1201 to 75 1320 (1939–45)
OKm11	2′C1′ h2t	10	Krauss/Linz	1922	bis 1954	as kkStB 629, delivered as PKP 7001–7010
OKz32	1′E1′ h2t	25	Cegielski	1933–1936	bis 1975	18 taken by DRB as 95 301 to 95 318 (1939–45)
Ol49	1′C1′ h2	112	Fablok	1951–1954		
Os24	2′D h2	60	Fablok	1926–1927	to 1970	16 taken by DRB as 33 201 to 33 216 (1939–45)
TKh29	C n2t	2	Fablok	1929	to 1953	TKh "Ferrum 29"; ex Werkbahn, acquired 1939; and ex ČSD, acquired 1949
TKh49	C n2t	1	Fablok	1961	—	TKh "Ferrum 47"
TKbb	B n2fl	43	Fablok, ZNTK Wrocław	1955-1967	2000	TKbb4 "1U";
TKp30	D h2t	2	Fablok	1930	1939	ELNA 6; ex Liegnitz-Rawitsch 183–184, acquired 1935/36
TKt48	1′D1′ h2t	191	Cegielski, Fablok	1950–1957	—	
Tr20	1′D h2	175	Baldwin	1919–1922	to 1974	US Army "Pershing"; delivered as PKP 6001–6175; 144 taken by DRB as 56 3701 to 56 3844
Tr21	1′D h2	148	StEG, Fablok, Tubize, Haine-St.-Pierre	1922–1925	to 1973	126 taken by DRB as 56 3901 to 56 4026
Tr201	1′D h2	75	Baldwin, ALCO, Lima	1944–1945	to 1978	USATC S160 Class, acquired from UNRRA
Tr202	1′D h2	30	Vulcan Foundry	1946	to 1976	UNRRA Liberation Class
Tr203	1′D h2	500	Baldwin, ALCO, Lima	1942–1945	to 1980	USATC S160 Class, acquired from USATC
Ty23	1′E h2	612	BMAG, Cockerill, St.-Léonard, Société Franco-Belge, Cegielski, Fablok, Warszawa	1923–1934	to 1980	470 taken by DRB as 58 2303 to 58 2702
Ty37	1′E h2	27+10	Cegielski	1937–1940	to 1977	last 10 delivered as DRB Class 58^{27p} A total of 28 taken over by DRB as 58 2901 to 58 2928
Ty42	1′E h2	150	Fablok, Cegielski	1945–1946	2003	Same as DRB Class 52
Ty43	1′E h2	126+3	Fablok	1946–1949	bis 2001	Same as DRB Class 42, 3 class Ty3 locos renumbered into class Ty43
Ty45	1′E h2	428	Fablok, Cegielski	1946–1951	2003	Modified version of Ty37
Ty51	1′E h2	212	Cegielski	1953–1958	to 2001	
Ty246	1′E h2	100	ALCO, Baldwin, Lima	1947	to 1981	

==== Industrial steam locomotives ====
PKP Class	UIC class	Quantity	Manufacturer	Year(s)	Withdrawn	Notes
TKz206	1'E1' t	1				
TKz 208 to 211	1'E1' t	3	Borsig (Berlin)	1935–1938	1974	TKz 211 is in the Warsaw railway museum
TKz 224	1'E1' t	1				
TKz 226	1'E1' t	1				

=== Narrow gauge steam locomotives ===
PKP Class	UIC class	Quantity	Manufacturer	Year(s)	Gauge	Notes
Tx26	D	3	Fablok	1926/1928	600 mm	
Px27	D	2	Fablok	1927	600 mm	
Wp29 (Px29)	D	20	WSABPW	1929	750 mm	
Tw29	E	?	Fablok	1929-1930	785 mm	
Px38	D	1	Fablok	1938	600 mm	
T49 (Ryś)	B	?	Fablok	1946-1950	600 mm / 750 mm / 760 mm / 785 mm	
Ty (Las47)	C	640	Fablok	1948–1958	600 mm / 750 mm / 760 mm / 785 mm	
Tw47	E	20	Fablok	1947–1949	785 mm	
Px48	D	111	Fablok	1950–1955	750 mm	
Px49	D	10	Fablok	1950	750 mm	
Kp4	D	790	Fablok	1950–1959	750 mm / 762mm	
Tw53	E	20	Fablok	1953–1954	785 mm	

== Diesel locomotives ==
=== Shunter diesel locomotives ===
PKP Class	UIC class	Quantity	Manufacturer	Year(s)	Withdrawn	Notes
3DL	B	?	Fablok	1937-1938	?	
Ld2-18-100	B	9	Lilpop	1939	?	
SM01	B	3	Deutz, Esslingen, Humboldt, etc	?	—	
SM02, Ls40	B	581	Fablok	1952-1961	—	
Ls60	B	562	Fablok, Zastal	1961-1971	—	
Ls75	B	20	Fablok	1958-1960	?	
SM03	B	875	Fablok, Zastal	1959–1969	—	
SM04, 409Da	B	865	Zastal, Mystal, ZNTK Oleśnica *	1969-1992	—	
410D	B	51	Zastal	1971-1975	—	
SM15	B′B′	2, 30 (Ls750H), 25 (Ls750Hu)	Lyudinovo, Fablok	1962–1967	1977	
SM25	C	3	Fablok	1961–1963	1973	
SM30, Ls300	Bo′Bo′	909	Fablok	1957–1971	—	
SM31	Co′Co′	197	Fablok	1976–1985	—	
SM32, 401Da	C	500	Fablok	1971-1979	—	
SM40	Bo′Bo′	10	Ganz-MÁVAG (Hungary)	1958	1992	
SM41	Bo′Bo′	372	Ganz-MÁVAG (Hungary)	1961–1971	2000	
SM42	Bo′Bo′	1157, 622 (Industrial)	Fablok	1963–1992	—	
6Dc	Bo′Bo′	1	ZNTK Piła *	1996	2010	SM42 Rebuild
Ls1000	Bo′Bo′	2	PTKiGK Rybnik *	1999, 2002	—	SM42 Rebuild
6De	Bo′Bo′	7	Huta Częstochowa, ZNTK Poznań *	1999-2002	—	SM42 Rebuild for steelworks in Częstochowa
6Dg	Bo′Bo′	3 (Huta Częstochowa), 129 (PKP Cargo), 83 (Private companies)	Newag *	2007-2024	—	SM42 Rebuild
6Dk	Bo′Bo′	6	Pesa SA *	2010-2012	—	SM42 Rebuild
6Dh-1	Bo′Bo′	27	Tabor Dębica *	2016-2025	—	SM42 Rebuild
6Dm	Bo′Bo′	2	ORION Kolej - Nowy Sącz *	2011,2025	—	SM42 Rebuild
18D	Bo′Bo′	10	Newag *	2014	—	SM42 Rebuild for shunting passenger wagons
SM48	Co’Co’	130	Bryansk Machine-Building Plant (USSR)	1974-1988	—	
SM60	B	10	CZ Loko (Czech Republic)	2021-2022	—	
TEM2	Co’Co’	328	Bryansk Machine-Building Plant (USSR)	1974-1988	—	
21D	Co’Co’	7	Tabor Dębica *	1974-1988	—	TEM2 Rebuilt (with same design)
TEM2B	Co’Co’	8	Bryansk Machine-Building Plant (USSR)	1988-1990	—	
TEM18	Co’Co’	1	Bryansk Machine-Building Plant (Russia)	2006	—	Exported to Conakry, Guinea
S-200	Co’Co’	174	ČKD (Czechslovakia)	1966-1989	—	One locomotive exported to Albania
T448P	Bo′Bo′	166, 14 (740)	ČKD (Czechslovakia)	1976-1989	—	
T458P	Bo′Bo′	4	ČKD (Czechslovakia)	1965-1972	—	
T419P	Bo′Bo′	1	ČKD (Czechslovakia)	1989	—	Exported to Slovakia
TGM40	B′B′	18	KMZ (USSR/Russia)	1988-1998	—	
LDH45	B′B′	26	FAUR (Romania)	1980-1989	—	
LDH70	B′B′	5	FAUR (Romania)	1982-1987	—	
DE 6400	Bo′Bo′	40	MaK (Germany)	1990-1993	—	
418D	B′	2, 1 (418Da)	Kolzam	1999, 2000, 2002	—	
650	C	1	Vossloh (Germany)	2012	—	Exported to Croatia
794	B	1	CZ Loko (Czech Republic)	2019	—	
797	B	2	CZ Loko (Czech Republic)	2007, 2011	—	
LM400	Bo′	1	Zakład Pojazdów Szynowych	2012	—	

(*) Conversion\Rebuild

=== Mainline diesel locomotives ===
PKP Class	UIC class	Quantity	Manufacturer	Year(s)	Withdrawn	Notes
SP30	Bo′Bo′	108	ZNTK Nowy Sącz *	1974–1978	2000	
SP32	Bo′Bo′	150	FAUR (Romania)	1985–1991	—	
SP32M	Bo′Bo′	10	ZNTK *	2000-2003	—	SP32 rebuild
SU42	Bo′Bo′	39	ZNTK Nowy Sącz *	1975–1979	2000	SM42 conversion to mixed traffic
SU42	Bo′Bo′	40	ZNTK Nowy Sącz *	1999–2000	—	Newer SM42 conversion to mixed traffic
SU4210	Bo′Bo′	10	Newag *	2014-2015	—	SU42 rebuild
SU4220	Bo′Bo′	13	Newag *	2022	—	SU42 rebuild
SP42	Bo’Bo’	268	Fablok	1970–1978	—	
ST43	Co’Co’	422	Electroputere (Romania)	1965–1978	2019	
ST43-R	Co’Co’	15	Electroputere (Romania)	1964–1992	—	Some locomotives exported
060DA	Co’Co’	35	Electroputere (Romania)	1964-1993	—	Imported from Romania, some exported or scrapped
ST44	Co’Co’	1194	Voroshilovgrad Locomotive Works (USSR)	1965–1988	2022	
311D	Co’Co’	20	Newag *	2007-2008	—	ST44 rebuild
ST40s	Co’Co’	17	Newag *	2008-2010	—	ST44 rebuild for PKP LHS
ST44 (Pesa rebuild)	Co’Co’	76	Pesa SA *	2008-2021	—	Pesa rebuilt ST44 locomotives for PKP Cargo
ST44-3000	Co’Co’	2	Fablok *	2005	—	ST44 rebuild for PKP LHS
ST44-R	Co’Co’	12	? *	2004-2005	—	V200 rebuild
M62	Co’Co’	105	Voroshilovgrad Locomotive Works (USSR)	1966–1993	—	
M62M	Co’Co’	19	ZTK Włosienica *	2005-2012	—	ST44 rebuild for Pol-Miedż Trans
M62Y	Co’Co’	2	Tabor Szynowy Opole *	2012	—	2M62U rebuild, exported to Serbia
M62BF	Co’Co’	4	Fablok *	2009	—	ST44 rebuild for Pol-Miedż Trans
M62Ko	Co’Co’	3	Pesa SA *	2015-2016	—	M62 rebuilds for private companies
M62Ks	Co’Co’	32	Pesa SA *	2009-2016	—	ST44 rebuild for PKP LHS
313D	Co’Co’	1	Pesa SA *	2014	—	M62 rebuild
SP45	Co’Co’	265	Cegielski	1970–1976	1999	
SU45	Co’Co’	191	ZNTK Poznań *	1988–1997	2017	SP45 conversion to mixed traffic
301Db	Co’Co’	1	Unikol Workshop *	2013	—	
ST45	Co’Co’	19	Pesa SA *	2009-2012	2020	SP45/SU45 rebuild for PKP Cargo
ST46	Co’Co’	1	Pesa SA *	2011	2018	ST46 rebuild for PKP Cargo
SU46	Co’Co’	54	Cegielski	1974–1985	2023	
SP47	Co’Co’	2	Cegielski	1975–1977	1998	Prototype
ST48	Co’Co’	80	Newag *	2013-2020	—	SM48 rebuild
15D, 15D/A	Co’Co’	46	Newag *	2016-2024	—	TEM2 rebuild
16D	Co’Co’	9	Newag *	2010-2013	—	TEM2 rebuild for PKP LHS
19D	Co’Co’	1	Newag *	2017	—	TEM2-154 rebuild
BR231	Co’Co’	9	October Revolution Locomotive Works (USSR)	1973-1977	—	
BR232	Co’Co’	81	October Revolution Locomotive Works (USSR)	1973-1982	—	
BR233	Co’Co’	12	October Revolution Locomotive Works (USSR)	1973-1981	—	
754	Bo’Bo’	6	ČKD (Czechslovakia)	1978-1979	—	
BR285	Bo'Bo'	10	Bombardier Transportation (Germany)	2010-2011	—	
SU160	Bo'Bo'	10	Pesa SA	2014-2015	—	
SU175	Co'Co'	6	Henschel & Son (West Germany)	1981-1985	—	PKP unused
Class 66	Co'Co'	51	EMD (Canada)	1999-2008	—	

(*) Conversion/Rebuild

=== Locomotives owned abroad operating in Poland ===
PKP Class	UIC class	Quantity	Manufacturer	Year(s)	Withdrawn	Notes
753	Bo'Bo'	11	ČKD (Czechslovakia)	1972-1977	—	
Maxima 40CC 264	C'C'	6	Voith (Germany)	2008-2009	—	
Gravita 10BB 261	B'B'	2, 1 (260)	Voith (Germany)	2010-2011	—	

=== Narrow gauge diesel locomotives ===
PKP Class	UIC class	Quantity	Manufacturer	Year(s)	Gauge	Notes
Ls600	B	?	?	?	600 mm	
Lds100	B	5	KOMAG	1977-1978	550 mm - 750 mm	
Lds100K-EM	B	?	KOMAG	?	750 mm, 785 mm, 900 mm	
Lds100K-EM A	B	?	KOMAG	?	750 mm, 785 mm, 900 mm	
DL6	B	?	Diepholzer Maschinenfabrik F. Schöttler	?	600 mm	
Gls30	B	160	ZREMB	1961-1964	500 mm - 750 mm	
WLs40/50	B	1973	ZNTK Poznań	1951-1975	600 mm	
WLs50M1	B	7	? *	1990	600 mm	
WLs50M3	B	7	? *	1990-1992	600 mm, 630 mm	
2WLs40/50	B	200	ZNTK Poznań	1954-1975	750 mm, 785 mm, 900 mm	
3WLs50	B	4	ZNTK Poznań	1961, 1973, 1975	550 mm	
4WLs50	B	2	ZNTK Poznań	1975	1035 mm	
WLs75	B	86	ZNTK Poznań	1965-1975	750 mm, 785 mm, 900 mm	
WLp50	B	?	KOMAG	from 1989	600 mm - 900 mm	
WLp50EM	B	?	KOMAG	?	600 mm	
WLp85	B	?	KOMAG	?	600 mm	
V10C	C	31	Lokomotivbau Karl Marx	1959-1975	600 mm, 640 mm	
Lxd2	Bo′Bo′	166	FAUR (Romania)	1967–1985	750 mm, 785 mm, 1000 mm	
Lyd1	C	191	Fablok, Zastal	1960–1972	750 mm, 785 mm, 900 mm	
Lyd2	C	80	FAUR, (Romania)	1977–1982	600 mm, 750 mm, 785 mm, 1000 mm	

(*) Conversion/Rebuild

== Electric locomotives ==
=== 3 kV DC system locomotives ===
PKP Class	UIC class	Quantity	Manufacturer	Year(s)	Withdrawn	Notes
EL.100	Bo′Bo′	10	English Electric (United Kingdom), Fablok	1936, 1939	1964	
EL.200	Bo′Bo′	4	Cegielski	1938	1958	
E626	Bo′BoBo′	5	Breda (Italy)	1931	1962	
EP02	Bo′Bo′	8	Pafawag	1953–1957	1973	
EP03	Bo′Bo′	8	ASEA (Sweden)	1951	1974	
EU04	Bo′Bo′	25	LEW Hennigsdorf (East Germany)	1954–1955	1983	
2E53	Co′Co′	9	Pafawag	1954-1956	1978	
EU05	Bo′Bo′	30	Škoda Works (Czechoslovakia)	1961	1977	
EP05	Bo′Bo′	27	ZNTK Gdańsk *	1973–1977	—	EU05 Rebuild
ET05 **	Bo′Bo′	12	Škoda Works (Czechslovakia)	1960	—	
EU06	Bo′Bo′	20	English Electric (United Kingdom)	1962	2016	
EU07	Bo′Bo′	240 (4E), 245 (303E)	Pafawag, Cegielski, ZNTK Oleśnica *	1965–1994	—	
303E	Bo′Bo′	2	Tabor Dębica *	2025	—	EU07 Rebuild
4E	Bo′Bo′	1	ZNTK Lubań *	1999	—	EU07 Rebuild
EU07E	Bo′Bo′	12	ZNTK *	2011-2025	—	EU07 Rebuild
EU07A	Bo′Bo′	3	ZNTK Oleśnica *	2011, 2014	—	EU07 Rebuild for PKP Intercity
303Eb	Bo′Bo′	29	ZNLE Gliwice, Ostrów Wielkopolski *	2011, 2013	—	EU07 Rebuild for PKP Cargo
303Ec	Bo′Bo′	1	ZNLE Gliwice *	2011	—	EU07 Rebuild for PKP Cargo without multiple ccontrol
EP07	Bo′Bo′	100, 69 (1001-1069)	ZNTK *	1995–2008	—	EU07 Rebuild for passenger service
EP07P	Bo′Bo′	5	ZNLE Gliwice *	2012	—	EU07 Rebuild for Interregional service
EP08	Bo′Bo′	15	Pafawag	1972–1976	—	
EP09	Bo′Bo′	47	Pafawag	1986–1997	—	
EM10	Bo′Bo′	4	Cegielski	1990–1991	2009	
ET11 **	Bo′Bo′	7	Škoda Works (Czechslovakia)	1977	—	
ET13 **	Bo′Bo′	3	Škoda Works (Czechslovakia)	1957-1958	—	
140	Bo′Bo′	2	Škoda Works (Czechslovakia)	1957, 1958	—	
30E1	Bo′Bo′	2	Škoda Works (Czechslovakia)	1959	2019	
163 **	Bo′Bo′	16	Škoda Works (Czechslovakia)	1985-1986	—	
EU20	Co′Co′	34	LEW Hennigsdorf (East Germany)	1955–1957	1982	
ET21	Co′Co′	83 (3E), 643 (3E/1)	Pafawag	1957–1971	2016	
3E-100	Co′Co′	9	Newag *	2010-2014	—	ET21 Rebuild
3E/1	Co′Co′	21	ZNTK *	2010-2016	—	ET21 Rebuild
3E/1M	Co′Co′	7	ZNTK Oleśnica, Newag *	2009-2015	—	ET21 Rebuild
ET22	Co′Co′	1181	Pafawag	1969–1989	—	
201E	Co′Co′	5	ZNTK *	1998-2003	—	
201Eo	Co′Co′	14	Pafawag	1976-1977	—	Built for ONCF, exported back to Poland
ET22-1034	Co′Co′	3	Tabor Dębica *	2014-2018	—	ET22 Rebuild
ET22-R	Co′Co′	5	Pafawag	1976-1983	—	Built for ONCF, exported back to Poland
Toro-002	Co′Co′	1	Tabor Dębica *	2024	—	ET22 Rebuild
201Ec	Co′Co′	2	Pafawag	1978	2006	
201Em	Co′Co′	28	ZNLE Gliwice *	2004-2010	—	ET22 Rebuild for PKP Cargo
201Ek	Co′Co′	20	ZNLE Gliwice *	2010-2011	—	ET22 Rebuild for PKP Cargo
201El	Co′Co′	17	ZNLE Gliwice *	2012	—	ET22 Rebuild for PKP Cargo
EP23	Co′Co′	1	Pafawag	1973	1979	
ET23 **	Bo′Bo′	1	Škoda Works (Czechslovakia)	1961	—	
181	Co′Co′	54	Škoda Works (Czechslovakia)	1961-1962	—	
182	Co′Co′	64	Škoda Works (Czechslovakia)	1963-1965	—	
ET25	Co′Co′	3	Newag	2018	—	
ET26	Co′Co′	7	Newag	2019	—	
ET40	Bo′Bo′+Bo′Bo′	60	Škoda Works (Czechoslovakia)	1975–1978	—	
EP40	Bo′Bo′+Bo′Bo′	1	ZNTK Gdańsk *	1990	1993	ET40 Rebuild for passenger service
ET41	Bo′Bo′+Bo′Bo′	200	Cegielski	1977–1983	—	
ET42	Bo′Bo′+Bo′Bo′	50	NEVZ (USSR)	1978–1982	2025	
EU47	Bo′Bo′	11	Bombardier Transportation	2010-2011	—	
E483	Bo′Bo′	15	Bombardier Transportation	2010, 2011, 2016	—	
594	Bo′Bo′	30	Alstom	2019-2025	—	
EU160	Bo′Bo′	98	Newag	2019-2025	—	
E4DCU	Bo′Bo′	1	Newag	2021	—	
E4DCUd	Bo′Bo′	5	Newag	2017	—	
E6ACT	Co′Co′	9	Newag	2009-2014	—	
E6ACTd	Co′Co′	6	Newag	2016-2017	—	
E6ACTab	Co′Co′	27	Newag	2019-2024	—	
E6ACTa	Co′Co′	16	Newag	2018-2019	—	
111Eb	Bo′Bo′	4	Pesa SA	2015-2016	—	
111Eo	Bo′Bo′	9	Pesa SA	2022-2023	—	
207E	Co′Co′	13	ZNTK Oleśnica *	2017-2025	—	M62 Rebuild into electric locomotive
Zapychacz UFO	Bo′Bo′	1	REMB *	2002	—	SM42 Rebuild into electric self propelled mode locomotive
X4EC	Bo′Bo′	26	Siemens (Germany)	2010-2014	—	

(*) Conversion/Rebuild (**) Loan

=== Multi system locomotives ===
PKP Class	UIC class	Quantity	Manufacturer	Year(s)	Withdrawn	Notes
1822	Bo′Bo′	2	SGP	1993	2011	
EU43**	Bo′Bo′	6	Bombardier Transportation	2006-2007	—	
E186	Bo′Bo′	11	Bombardier Transportation	2007-2020	—	
388	Bo′Bo′	4	Alstom	2022	—	
E189	Bo′Bo′	9	Siemens	2009	—	
ET43	Co′Co′	24	Newag	2020-2022	—	
E6MST	Co′Co′	8	Newag	2025	—	
EU44 Husarz	Bo′Bo′	10	Siemens	2008–2010	—	
EU45**	Bo′Bo′	9	Siemens	2009-2011	—	
EU46	Bo′Bo′	25	Siemens	2015-2023	—	
193/6193	Bo′Bo′	46	Siemens	from 2021	—	
EU200	Bo′Bo′	10	Newag	from 2023	—	
E4MSU	Bo′Bo′	1	Newag	2012	—	

(**) Loan

=== Other system locomotives ===
PKP Class	UIC class	Quantity	Manufacturer	Year(s)	Withdrawn	Notes
EU40	Bo	1	AEG (German Empire)	1913	1959	Operated before PKP
EU41	Bo	1	? (German Empire)	1900	1959	Operated before PKP
EL2	Bo′Bo′	62	LEW (East Germany)	1958-1987	—	
EL16	Bo		LEW	1966-1990 (East Germany)	—	Battery electric towing vehicle
E94	Co′Co′	11	AEG	1940-1944	1988	Operated in Silesia which was occupied by Germany
E95	1′Co+Co1′	6	AEG (Weimar Republic)	1927-1928	1970	operated in Silesia which was occupied by Germany
EPA42	Bo′Bo′	1	ZNTK Nowy Sącz *	1985	1996	SM42 Rebuild into battery electric locomotive
ZARMEN MLK	Bo′Bo′	1	Grupa ZARMEN	2015	—	Battery electric shunter prototype

(*) Conversion/Rebuild

=== locomotives owned abroad operating in Poland ===
PKP Class	UIC class	Quantity	Manufacturer	Year(s)	Withdrawn	Notes
140	Bo′Bo′	11	Škoda Works (Czechslovakia)	1957-1958	—	
141	Bo′Bo′	5	Škoda Works (Czechslovakia)	1959	2005	
121	Bo′Bo′	10	Škoda Works (Czechslovakia)	1960	—	
130	Bo′Bo′	41	Škoda Works (Czechslovakia)	1977	—	
131	Bo′Bo′+Bo′Bo′	50	Škoda Works (Czechslovakia)	1980-1982	—	
183	Co′Co′	25	Škoda Works (Czechslovakia)	1971	—	
386	Bo′Bo′	44	Bombardier Transportation	2014-2018	—	
E186	Bo′Bo′	73	Bombardier Transportation	2006-2020	—	
188	Bo′Bo′	11	Alstom	2018, 2022, 2023	—	
388	Bo′Bo′	31	Alstom	2020-2025	—	
183/1216	Bo′Bo′	5	Siemens (Germany)	2007-2010	—	
189	Bo′Bo′	32	Siemens (Germany)	2003-2004	—	
1293	Bo′Bo′	94	Siemens (Germany)	2017-2025	—	
191	Bo′Bo′	1	Siemens (Germany)	2015	—	
193	Bo′Bo′	278	Siemens (Germany)	2014-2025	—	
383	Bo′Bo′	97	Siemens (Germany)	2016-2018	—	
471	Bo′Bo′	3	Siemens (Germany)	2017	—	

=== Narrow gauge electric locomotives ===
PKP Class	UIC class	Quantity	Manufacturer	Year(s)	Gauge	Notes
EL3	Bo′Bo′	53	LEW	1955-1964	900 mm	
EL05	Bo′	?	LEW	?	785 mm	
Siemens & Halske Bo	Bo′	?	Siemens	?	785 mm	
Ld1	Bo′	?	?	?	600 mm	One preserved at Złoty Stok Gold mine
Ldag05	Bo′	?	Konstal	?	500 mm - 650 mm	Battery electric locomotive

== Diesel multiple units ==
=== Diesel railcars ===
PKP Class	UIC class	Quantity	Manufacturer	Year(s)	Withdrawn	Notes
11 111	2	1	Ganz-MÁVAG (Hungary)	1927	?	
90 003, 90 062	(1A)′(A1)′	2	DWK	1928, 1929	?	
90 007	Bo′2	1	Zakłady Ostrowieckie *	1936	?	
90 011	2′Bo′	1	Weyer (German Empire)	1910	1937	
90 029	A1	1	Ganz-MÁVAG (Hungary)	1927	?	
90 030	A1	1	Lilpop	1934	?	
90 057	(1A)′(A1)′	1	Cegielski	1934	?	
90 058-060, 065, 087-091	(1A)′(A1)′	9	Cegielski, Lilpop	1935-1936	?	
90 063	(1A)′(A1)′	1	Lilpop	1934	?	
90 064	B′2′	1	WSABP	1934	1939	
90 075	A1	10	Lilpop	1935	1955	
90 076-079, 90 086	(1A)′(A1)′	5	Cegielski	1936	1939	
90 080	(1A)′(A1)′	1	Austro-Daimler (Austria)	1933	?	
90 081-085	(1A)′(A1)′	5	Fablok	1936	1948	
90 092-094	B′2′	3	Sanok	1936	?	
90 095	(1A)′(A1)′	1	Chorzów	1936	?	
90 096-098	Bo′2′	3	Cegielski	1938	?	
90 099-90 113	(1A)′(A1)′	15	Cegielski	1939	?	
93 001-005	2	5	Lilpop	1935	?	
SN51	AA (01), A1 (02)	2	Waggonbau Görlitz (East Germany)	1939	1966	
SN51-04	A1	1	Tablot (West Germany)	1936	1962	
SR51	A1	8	Waggonbau Görlitz	1954-1955	1996	
SN52	B′2′	50	Ganz (Hungary)	1954–1955	1986	
SR52	(1A)′(A1)′	4	Waggonbau Görlitz	1957	1991	
SR53	A1	5	ZNTK Lubań	1965-1973	?	
SN60	B′2′	4	Ganz (Hungary)	1956	1982	
SN61	B′2′	250	Ganz-MÁVAG	1960-1975	—	
SR61	B′2′	2	ZNTK Poznań *	1976, 1985	1996	
SR71	A1	24	ZNTK Lubań	1974-1982	—	
SN80	B′2′	13	HCP	1961–1964	1981	
SD80	(1A)′(A1)′	3	OM Milano (Italy)	1949	1963	
SR70	(1A)′(A1)′	1	ZNTK Poznań *	1967	1974	
VT627.0	B′2′	3	LHB, MaK (West Germany)	1974-1975	—	
VT627.1	B′2′	4	MaK (West Germany)	1981-1982	—	
810	A′1′	8	Vagonka studenka (Czechslovakia)	1976-1984	—	

=== Diesel railbuses ===
PKP Class	UIC class	Quantity	Manufacturer	Year(s)	Withdrawn	Notes
SN81	1′A′+1′1′	5	Kolzam (Racibórz)	1988–1990	2015	
SN82	2′B′	3	Duewag	1983	—	
SN83	2′B′+B′2′	7	Duewag	1981-1982	—	
SA101	1′A′+1′1′	3	ZNTK Poznań	1990–1992	2016	
SA102	1′A′+1′1′+A′1′	3	ZNTK Poznań	1993–1996	2016	
SA103	B′2′	13	Pesa SA	2005–2006	—	
SA104	A′A′+1′1′	1	Kolzam Racibórz	1995	2013	
SA105	A′1′	2 (213M), 5 (213Ma)	ZNTK Poznań	2002-2004	—	
SA106	B′2′	19	Pesa SA	2001–2007	—	
SA107	A′1′	2	Kolzam Racibórz	2003–2004	—	
SA108	A′1′+1′A′	10	ZNTK Poznań	2003–2006	—	
SA109	A′1′+1′A′	11	Kolzam Racibórz	2003–2005, 2012	—	
SA123	4	5	Pesa SA	2009	—	
SA131	B′2′2′	1	Pesa SA	2005	—	
SA132	B′2′B′	15	Pesa SA	2005–2007	—	
SA133	B′2′B′	31	Pesa SA	2006–2015	—	
SA134	B′2′B′	29	Pesa SA	2007–2014	—	
SA135	B′2′	24	Pesa SA	2008–2015	—	
SA136	B′2′2′B′	19	Pesa SA	2010-2011, 2015	—	
SA137	B′2′B′	9	Newag Nowy Sącz	2010-2014	—	
SA138	B′2′2′B′	5	Newag Nowy Sącz	2010-2012	—	
SA139	B′2′B′	21	Pesa SA	2012-2015	—	
222M	B′2′B′	2	Newag Nowy Sącz	2013, 2015	—	
SA140	B′2′B′	4	Newag Nowy Sącz	2017, 2020	—	

=== Diesel multiple units ===
PKP Class	UIC class	Quantity	Manufacturer	Year(s)	Withdrawn	Notes
SN84	B’2’+2’2’+2’B’	4	MAN, Waggonfabrik Uedringen (West Germany)	1972-1975	—	
SD85	2′B′+B′2′	32	Tablot (West Germany)	1996-1998	—	
SA110	B′2′+2′2′+2′B′	14+5	MAN, Waggonfabrik Uerdingen (West Germany)	1964-1966	—	
VT628	2′B′+B′2′	4	LHB, Waggonfabrik Uerdingen (West Germany)	1974	—	
MR+MRD	2′B′+B′2′	7	Scandia (Denmark), Waggonfabrik Uerdingen (West Germany)	1978-1984	2022	
628/928	2′B′+2′2′	6	Waggonfabrik Uerdingen (Germany)	1993	—	
Y	(1A)′(A1)′+2′2′(+2′2′)	1	Waggonfabrik Uerdingen (West Germany)	1965/1970	—	
MA	B′2+2′2′+2′2′+2′2′	5	MAN/LHB (West Germany)	1963-1966	1994	

=== Narrow gauge diesel multiple units ===
PKP Class	UIC class	Quantity	Manufacturer	Year(s)	Gauge	Notes
MBxc1	A1′2	?	Lilpop	1934	600 mm	
MBd1	various	19	various	1933–1971	750 mm	
MBxd1	various	16+19	various	1930–1967	750 mm, 1000 mm	
MBxd2	B′2′	20+12	FAUR, (Romania)	1984–1986	750 mm, 1000 mm	

== Electric multiple units ==
Images	PKP Class	UIC class	Quantity	Manufacturer	Year(s)	Withdrawn	Notes
	EW51	?	36	LRL, Sanok, HCP	1936–1939	1979	
	EW52	?	10	VEB Waggonbau Görlitz, (East Germany)	1954	1978	
	EW53	?	20	Pafawag	1954–1956	1986	
	EW54	?	44	ASEA, (Sweden)	1950–1952	1981	
	EW55	?	72	Pafawag	1958–1962	1995	
	EN56	?	36	VEB Waggonbau Görlitz, (East Germany)	1955–1957	1984	
	EN57	?	1418	Pafawag	1962–1994	—	
	EW58	?	28	Pafawag	1974–1980	—	
	ED59	?	1	PESA	2006	—	
	EW60	?	2	Pafawag	1990	—	
	EN61	?	1	Newag	2006	—	
	ED70	?	2	VEB Waggonbau Görlitz, (East Germany)	1958	1977	
	EN71	?	50	Pafawag, ZNTK	1976–2003	—	
	ED72	?	21	Pafawag	1993–1996	—	
	ED73	?	1	Pafawag	1997	—	
	ED74	?	14	PESA	from 2006	—	
	EN80	?	20	English Electric	1927	1973	
	EN80	?	32	English Electric, Konstal	1927,1948	1972	
	EN81	?	3	Beuchelt	1898–1900	1959	
	EN81	?	4	PESA	from 2005	—	
	EW90	?	54	former S-Bahn Berlin	1927–1930	1976	
	EW91	?	20	former S-Bahn Berlin	1938–1941	1976	
	EW92	?	6	former S-Bahn Berlin	1936	1976	
	EN94	?	40	Pafawag	1969–1972	—	
	EN95	?	1	PESA	from 2004	—	

== See also ==
- History of rail transport in Poland
