= PKP class SP32 =

SP32
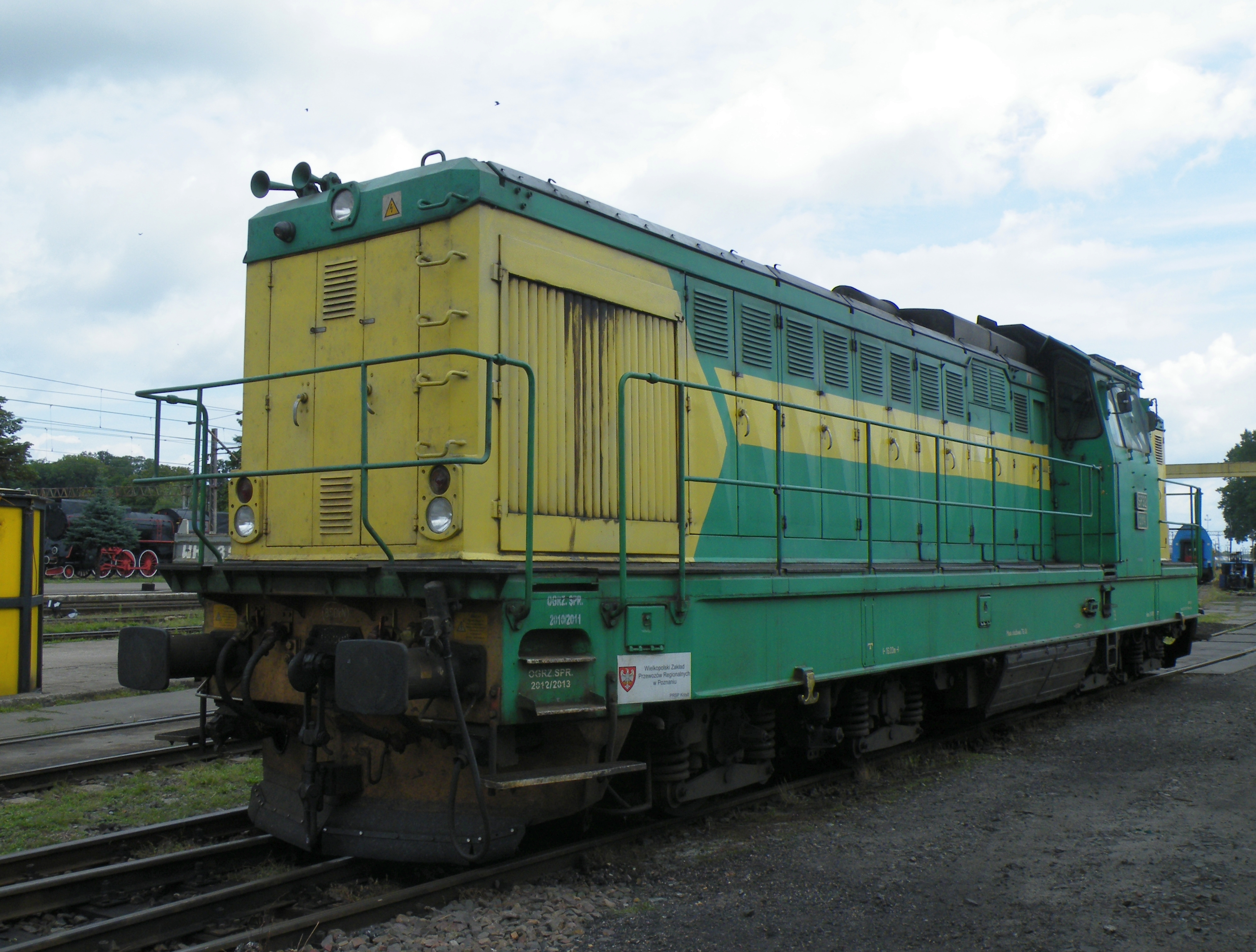
- SP32 of Polregio
Type and origin
- Power type: Diesel-electric
- Builder: (Romania) FAUR
- Build date: 1985 – 1991
- Total produced: 150
Specifications
- Configuration
  - UIC: Bo′Bo′
- Gauge: 1,435 mm (4 ft 8 1/2 in)
- Bogies: 2
- Wheel diameter: 1,100 mm (43 in)
- Length: 16,000 mm (52 ft 6 in)
- Width: 3,100 mm (10 ft 2 in)
- Height: 4,220 mm (13 ft 10 in)
- Loco weight: 74 t
- Fuel type: Diesel
- Fuel capacity: 3,000 L (660 imp gal; 790 US gal)
- Prime mover: M820SR; 12V396TC12; 12V396TC14
- Engine type: four-stroke
- Traction motors: MCT 542
- Transmission: electrical
- Loco brake: Oerlikon
Performance figures
- Maximum speed: 100 km/h (62 mph)
- Power output: 957 hp 1015 hp
- Tractive effort: 181,42 kN
Career
- Operators: PKP
- Class: (Poland) SP32
- Number in class: 150
- Nicknames: Odkurzacz
- Delivered: 1985

SP32 is a Romanian series of diesel passenger locomotives used by PKP.

== History ==
The start of the 1980s was the demise of Polish steam locomotives era. New diesel locomotives were needed for pulling passenger trains. Locomotives that were able to heat carriages with electrical systems were most in demand. Due to an economic crisis within Poland, it was impossible to start local production, so PKP decided to buy 200 locomotives produced in FAUR (former 23 August Works) from Bucharest, Romania. This company had previously produced Lxd2 and MBxd2 narrow gauge locomotives for PKP.

First two locomotives began to work for PKP in 1985 and received the SP49 designation. Different series numbers were given as those locomotives were supposed to work in multiple steering. As other engines lacked that device, all locomotives were renamed to SP32-001 and 002. Units were appointed to the Jasło, Nysa, Siedlce, and Zamość depots. The very first month of service revealed a series of failures that were reported back to the producer. Changes introduced afterwards did not limit the breakdowns. The most serious problems included failures of the diesel engines, compressors, and alternators. Additionally, their power proved to be insufficient, especially during winter when heating the carriages.

These problems caused an end of their importation in 1991, after a total of 150 units. The last two locomotives (151 and 152) exchanged prototypes and their numbers were changed to 001 and 002. As the whole series had been far too young to be withdrawn, several attempts to upgrade the units were started. New diesel engines (12V396TC12 licensed by MTU) had the same power as previous ones, but were more reliable. They were installed in the following units: 073, 096, 147, 148, and 149.

In 2000, a more complex modernization of the SP32 series began. Locomotives were given new 12V396TC14 diesel engines with an electronic regulator produced by MTU, on-board diagnostics system, more convenient dashboards, fire extinguishing installation, and new lights. The leasing company that now owns and lends PKP modernized locomotives funded the modernization. Units with all those improvements were numbered from 201 to 210. Presently, only those locomotives are in use, with the rest remaining as reserve. About one-third of the locomotives have been scrapped.

== Technical data ==
SP32 is a Bo′Bo′ locomotive as it runs on two bogies, each equipped with two axles. Each axle is propelled separately by one traction motor. Power from diesel engine to traction motors is delivered through electrical transmission. The electric heating system is powered by a 250 kW alternator that allows the locomotive to heat six carriages (assuming 40 kW power consumption per carriage). During summer months all power from heating is transferred to traction motors, thus increasing tractive effort. Traction motors, bogies, transmissions, and compressor, as well as several different parts are similar to those used in ST43 locomotive.

SP32 has a non-typical for Polish passenger locomotives box construction. It has only one crew compartment, located approximately two-thirds of way down the locomotive. Thanks to a replaceable dashboard, driving in both directions is comfortable. The relatively low weight this locomotive puts on rails allows it to run on tracks laid on unstable surfaces.

== Nicknames ==
- Odkurzacz (En.: Vacuum cleaner)
- Caucescu's Revenge - because of the malfunctioning original Romanian M820SR diesel engine
- Rumun (En.: Romanian) - because of origin (Romania)
- Papuga (En.: Parrot) - because of painting
