= PKP class MBxd1 =

Polish diesel railcar

Mbxd1 (1Mw type)
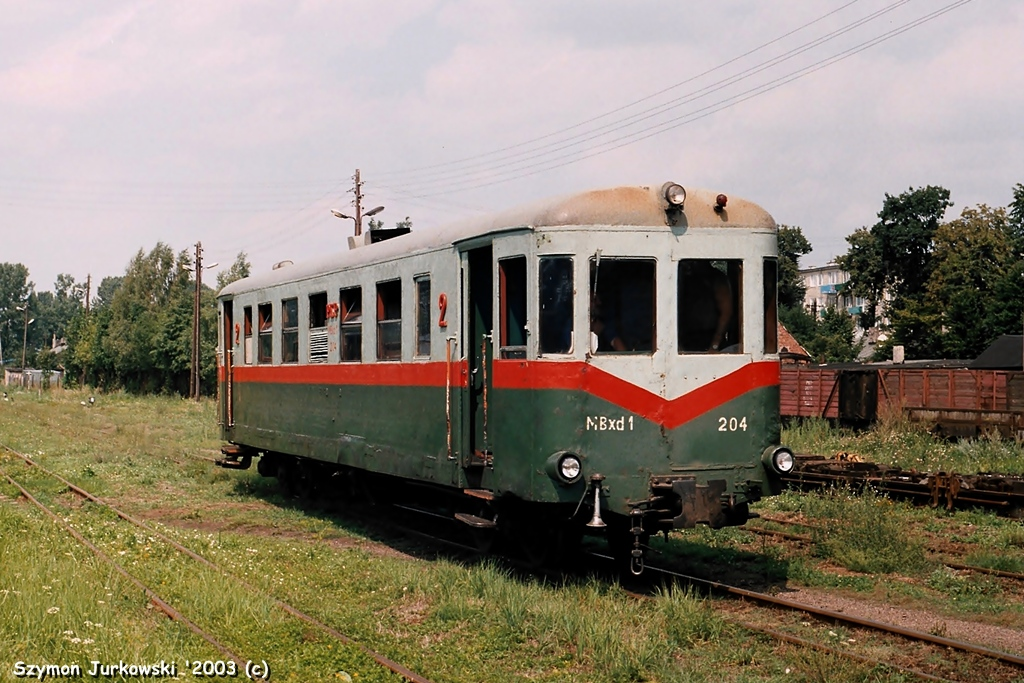
- MBxd1-204 at the railway station in Krośniewice
- Stock type: diesel multiple unit
- Manufacturer: Konstal
- Assembly: Poland
- Constructed: 1960–1966
- Number built: 4
- Capacity: 36

Specifications
- Train length: 15,260 mm (601 in)
- Width: 2,260 mm (89 in)
- Height: 3,040 mm (120 in)
- Wheel diameter: 700 mm (28 in)
- Maximum speed: 45 km/h (28 mph)
- Weight: 18 t (18 long tons; 20 short tons)
- Engine type: Wola DTK 150 (Wola 14H6)
- Transmission: mechanical
- AAR wheel arrangement: B'2'
- Braking system(s): Westinghouse XR 1

The 1Mw is a type of bidirectional, four-axle narrow-gauge diesel railcar produced by Konstal between 1960 and 1966. A total of four units were built, designed for operation on tracks with a gauge of 750 mm (29.5 in). On the Polish State Railways, these railcars were initially designated Mx-201 to 204 under the narrow-gauge rolling stock classification, later renumbered to MBxd1-201 to 204.

== History ==
In the 1950s, the Central Administration of Commuter Railways initiated efforts to replace steam-hauled passenger trains with diesel railcars in personal transport services. In 1958, production of such vehicles was commissioned from Konstal, accompanied by technical documentation developed by the Central Design Office of the Rolling Stock Industry in Poznań.

== Design ==
The 1Mw is a bidirectional, four-axle diesel railcar originally powered by a Wola DTK 150 diesel engine with an output of 150 hp (112 kW). It was equipped with a five-speed mechanical transmission manufactured by Jelcz, pneumatically controlled. Power from the gearbox was transmitted via a universal joint to a reversing gear, then to both axles of one of the bogies, resulting in a wheel arrangement of B'2'. The vehicle features a Westinghouse railway air brake system, type XR1.

During major overhauls in the 1980s, the original Wola DTK 150 engines were replaced with more modern and powerful Wola-Henschel 14H6 engines. The gearboxes were swapped for units sourced from Kamaz trucks, and the axle gearboxes were replaced with those from Lxd2-series locomotives.

The railcar's body is constructed from steel. The interior is divided into four compartments: a passenger area (with 32 fixed seats and 4 foldable seats), an engine compartment (located centrally, splitting the passenger area into two sections), and two driver's cabs, one at each end of the vehicle. Originally, the cabs were relatively small, with vestibules and inter-car passage doors adjacent to them. Over time, the inter-car passages and vestibules were eliminated, allowing the cabs to be enlarged and a space to be created for the train conductor.

== Operations ==
The first 1Mw railcar produced (Mx201, later renumbered MBxd1-201) was delivered in 1960 for trial operation on the Krotoszyn Narrow-Gauge Railway (Pleszew Locomotive Depot). Although it performed well initially, numerous faults soon emerged, particularly with the gearbox and axle gearboxes. To address these issues, the railcar was returned to the manufacturer for repairs.

All four 1Mw railcars were initially operated on the Krotoszyn Narrow-Gauge Railway. Over time, they were transferred to other lines, including the Śmigiel Narrow-Gauge Railway and the Kuyavian Narrow-Gauge Railways. By the mid-1980s, all four units had been relocated to the Wrocław Narrow-Gauge Railway, where they remained in service until its closure in 1991. Following the shutdown of the Wrocław line, the railcars were sent to the Krośniewice Locomotive Depot. Today, two of the four original units survive: one remains stationed at Krośniewice, while the other is at Rogów Towarowy Wąskotorowy railway station on the Rogów–Rawa–Biała Narrow-Gauge Railway.

In November 2012, the Gniezno County authorities sold the derelict MBxd1-201 (the prototype), which had been out of service for a decade, for scrap. This decision sparked significant attention in the specialist press. The Foundation of Polish Narrow-Gauge Railways managed to repurchase some components for use in the planned restoration of railcar 203.

Sources of service history data:
Original designation	Year built	Current designation	CETAR number (Note: CETAR refers to a unified numbering system introduced in 1974 by the Polish State Railways to standardize rolling stock identification for centralized billing and electronic data processing of freight transport charges.)	Service history	Status
Mx201	1960	MBxd1-201	00-380024960-3	Pleszew Wąsk. (1960–1975), Śmigiel (1975–1987), Trzebnica Gaj (1987–1992), Krośniewice (1992–2002), Gniezno Wąsk. (2002–2012)	Scrapped (2012)
Mx202	1965	MBxd1-202	00-380024961-1	Pleszew Wąsk. (1965–1966), Krośniewice (1966–1969), Pleszew Wąsk. (1969–1971), Śmigiel (1971–1986), Trzebnica Gaj (1986–1992), Krośniewice (1992–1997)	Scrapped (1997)
Mx203	1965	Mx-203	00-380024962-9	Pleszew Wąsk. (1965–1985), Trzebnica Gaj (1985–1991), Krośniewice (1991–2001), Piotrków Trybunalski Wąsk. (2001–2003), Rogów Wąsk. (since 2003)	Out of service
Mx204	1966	MBxd1-204	00-380024963-7	Pleszew Wąsk. (1967–1977), Śmigiel (1977–1987), Trzebnica Gaj (1987–1991), Krośniewice (since 1991)	Operational

== Designations ==
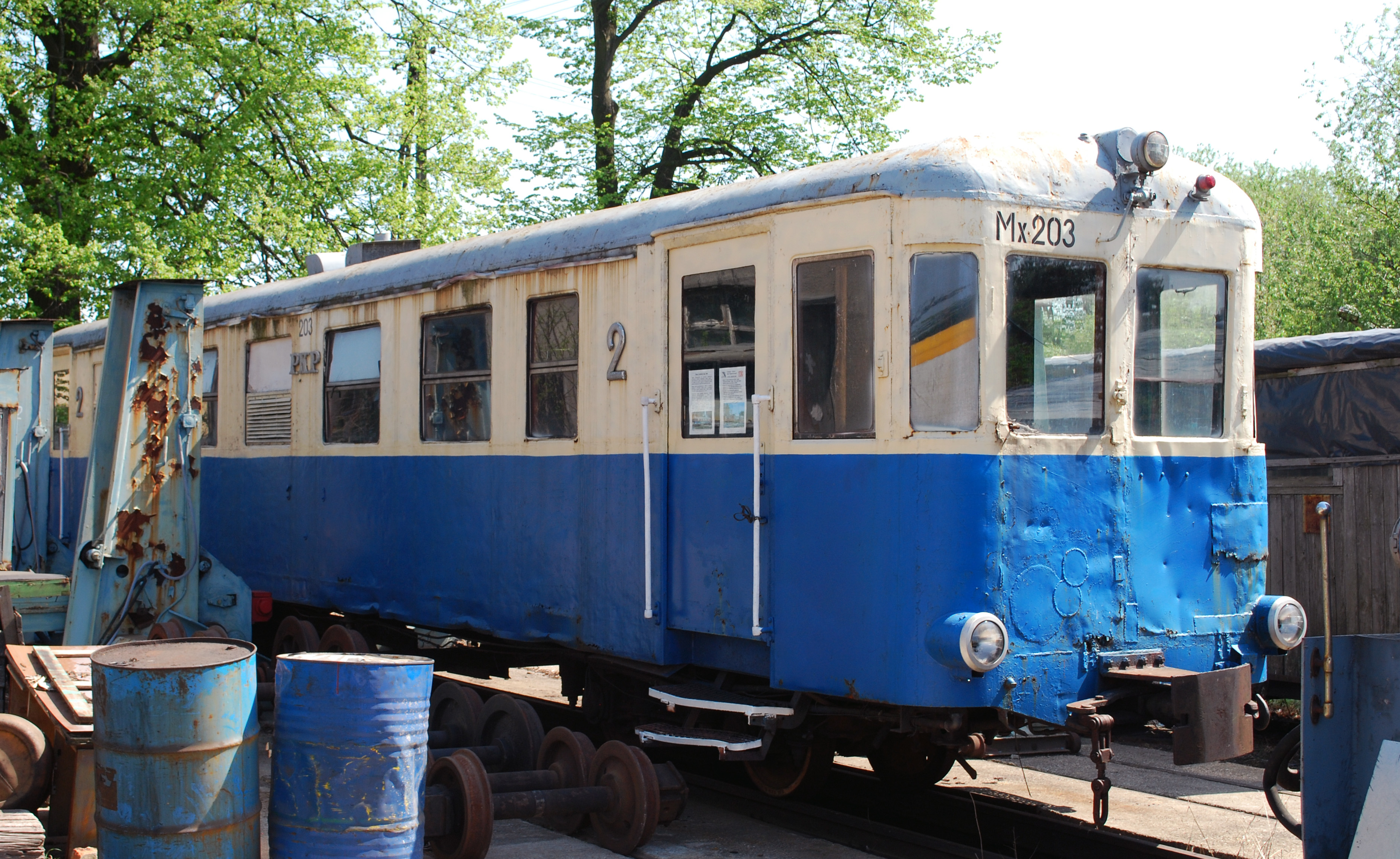
MBxd1 (Mx) - 203 in Rogów

The railcars were originally assigned the series designation Mx (Note: The letters denote: M – motor railcar with a diesel engine, x – four-axle.) with inventory numbers ranging from 201 to 204. Although new narrow-gauge rolling stock marking regulations (Instruction WM-11) took effect on 1 January 1961, these railcars retained their original designations until their factory livery (cream and blue) was changed to a celadon green with an orange stripe. Under the new regulations, they were then redesignated as series MBxd1 (Note: The letters denote: M – motor railcar, B – second class, x – four-axle, d – diesel-powered, 1 – with mechanical transmission.) (Note: The MBxd1 designation is also used for other types of narrow-gauge diesel railcars, distinguished by their number ranges.), retaining their original inventory numbers. In 1975, the railcars received additional standardized twelve-digit CETAR numbers while maintaining their series and inventory designations.
