= HCP EL.200 =

Series of four electric locomotives manufactured in Poznań in 1937

EL.200
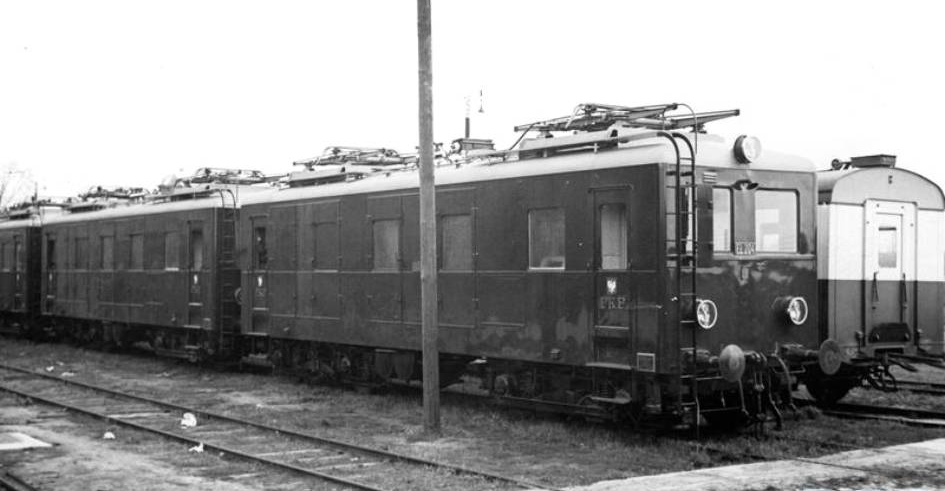
- EL.204
Type and origin
- Power type: electric
- Builder: H. Cegielski – Poznań
- Build date: 1937
Specifications
- Configuration
  - UIC: Bo'Bo'
- Wheel diameter: 1,000 mm (39 in)
- Length: 13,560 mm (534 in)
- Width: 2,866 mm (112.8 in)
- Height: 4,480 mm (176 in)
- Axle load: 15,6 T
- Service weight: 62.3 t (61.3 long tons; 68.7 short tons)
- Engine type: PK601
- Gear ratio: 74:21
Performance figures
- Maximum speed: 100 km/h (62 mph)
- Power output
  - 1 hour: 588 kW
  - Continuous: 432 kW

EL.200 was a series of four electric locomotives manufactured at the H. Cegielski factory in Poznań in 1937 for Polish State Railways. All the locomotives were assigned to serve the Warsaw Railway Junction. Three of the locomotives were destroyed in September 1939, and the fourth operated until 1944. The last EL.200 locomotive was scrapped in 1958.

== History ==
=== Origins ===
In 1933, a steam-powered railway tunnel was opened in Warsaw. Despite the use of smoke-extracting fans, the tunnel's smoke significantly limited train traffic. As a result, it was decided to install an electric traction system in the tunnel. Due to limitations in Poland's electrical engineering industry, the electrification, supply of rolling stock, and electrical equipment were contracted to the British company English Electric.

The EL.100 series locomotives began service in Warsaw in December 1936. These initial locomotives were designed for long-distance trains, so for shunting work in the tunnel, it was decided to use less powerful electric locomotives.

=== Production ===
At the request of the Ministry of Communications, the H. Cegielski factory in Poznań developed the design and then built the lightweight EL.200 series locomotives without electrical equipment. The pre-assembled vehicles, with factory numbers 342 to 345, were sent to the Lilpop, Rau i Loewenstein factory in Warsaw, where, in cooperation with British specialists, the electrical equipment was installed. The locomotives were designated as EL.201 to EL.204.

== Construction ==
=== Body ===
The body of the EL.200 was entirely metal, welded from steel plates. The coupling devices and buffers were bolted to the frame, forming a single unit with the body. To achieve higher tractive force and increased stability, the locomotive was ballasted with rebar plates weighing a total of 6 tons. The body rested on bogies via a gudgeon pin located in the center of the bogies. Due to the design of the body and bogies, the bogie pivot pins transferred the entire tractive force.

=== Chassis and bogies ===
The locomotive was supported by 2 two-axle bogies with individual drives, identical to those used in the E-91 series electric multiple units. The wheelsets, with forked journal guidance, had a three-stage suspension system using leaf springs and coil springs.

The PK601-type motors, suspended within the bogie frame by their nose, transmitted torque to the wheelsets through a cylindrical helical gear transmission with a 74:21 ratio, allowing a maximum speed of 100 km/h. The locomotive was equipped with air brakes manufactured by Westinghouse Electric Company.

=== Drive and electrical equipment ===
The drive consisted of four electric motors with a total maximum hourly power output of 588 kW. The electrical equipment, designed by English Electric, was structurally identical to that installed in the E-91 series electric trains. The locomotive was equipped with a 3,000/110 V direct current converter and two reciprocating compressors supplying the electropneumatic control and brakes. According to some sources, the locomotive featured multiple-unit train control.

The EL.204 locomotive (production number 345) was equipped with an electrically heated boiler, enabling the heating of passenger cars. This was the first electric locomotive in Europe to be fitted with steam heating for passenger trains.

== Operation ==
In 1937, all four locomotives were assigned to service trains between Warszawa Wschodnia and Warszawa Zachodnia stations, where they operated until the outbreak of World War II.

During a German air raid on Warsaw's railway infrastructure on 4 September 1939, three of the four locomotives in the series (EL.201, EL.202, and EL.204) were completely destroyed. After the German occupation, the last remaining locomotive was incorporated into the Ostbahn and was renamed Ostbahn E203. Once the Warsaw Railway Junction was made operational again, it continued to be used until 1944 to service the cross-city tunnel. Damaged during the fighting in Warsaw, it was not repaired after the war.

After some of its parts were transferred for the reconstruction of the E51 series electric multiple units (pre-war E-91 series), the wreck of EL.203 remained at the Warszawa Grochów depot until 1958, when it was scrapped. The locomotive did not receive a post-war Polish State Railways designation.
