= Newag 15D/16D =

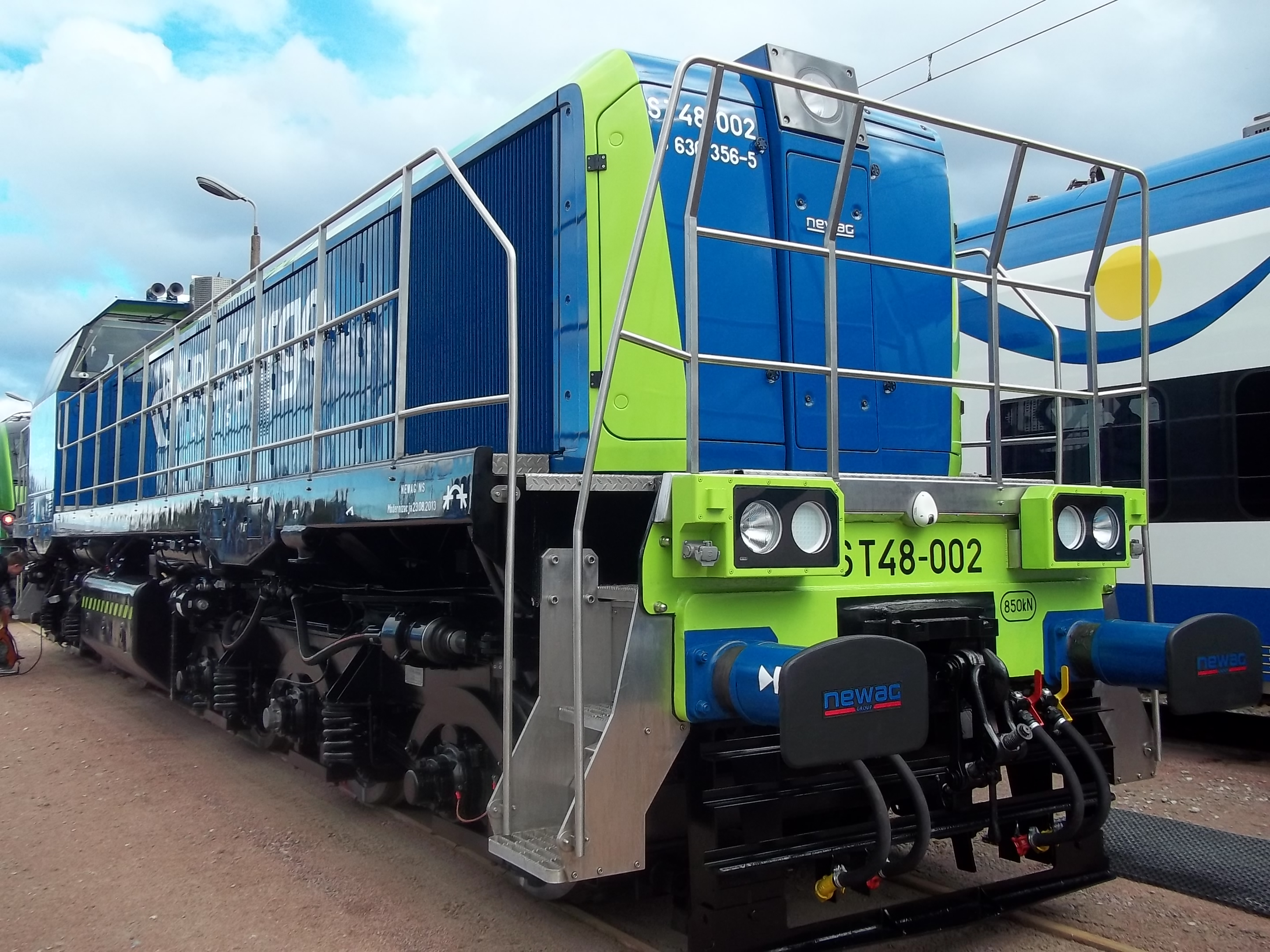
Type and origin
- Builder: BMZ, Bryansk
- Build date: 1974-1989
- Rebuilder: Newag, Nowy Sącz
- Rebuild date: 2010-
- Number rebuilt: 21 (ordered 39) (as of 2014)
Specifications
- Configuration
  - UIC: Co′Co′
- Gauge: 1,435 mm (4 ft 8 1/2 in) (15D); 1,524 mm (5 ft) (16D)
- Wheel diameter: 1,050 mm (41 in)
- Minimum curve: 80 m (260 ft)
- Wheelbase: 12,800 mm (42 ft 0 in)
- Pivot centres: 8,600 mm (28 ft 3 in)
- Length
  - Over couplers: 16,970 mm (55 ft 8 in)
- Height: 4,490 mm (14 ft 9 in)
- Axle load: 190 kN
- Loco weight: 116 t (114 long tons; 128 short tons)
- Fuel capacity: 6000 l
- Engine type: Caterpillar 3512C
- Cylinders: V12
- Transmission: electric
Performance figures
- Maximum speed: 100 km/h (62 mph)
- Power output: 1,550 kW (2,080 hp)

Newag 15D/16D is a cargo locomotive (type 15D - PKP ST48 series) or broad gauge (type 16D) diesel locomotive rebuilt by Newag in Nowy Sącz in Poland, which is a deeply modernised SM48 (Soviet TEM2) locomotive.

== Modernisation ==
As a result of the modernisation the Soviet-produced internal combustion engine was replaced with a US drive unit that meets the emissions standards for UIC IIIa. The power output has been raised from 0.88 MW (1200 hp) to 1.55 MW (2100 hp), which makes the new version suitable for shunting. The driver cabin has been changed based on Newag 6Dg and, combined with lower height of prime mover compartment, visibility from the cab has been improved. Air conditioning (KL20 with a power of 4.3 kW), GPS, and NES microprocessor control system were installed in the driver's cab. The reused components undergone major repairs are: rigid frame and boogies, the brake system, which had been fitted with four cylinders per boogie, spring brake system, and traction motors, which are subjected to pressure-vacuum impregnation. The power generator consists of an internal CAT 3512C engine with main generator and auxiliary generators. The locomotive has a microprocessor control, modular braking system array with rotary-screw compressor, and the AC/DC converters.

== Operators ==
| Proprietor | Quantity (ordered) | Type | Designation |
|---|---|---|---|
| Kolprem | 2 | 16D | 16D |
| PKP Cargo | 32 (90) | 15D | ST48 |
| PKP LHS | 7 | 16D | 16D |
| Rail Polonia | 2 | 15D | 15D |
