= Zastal 410D =

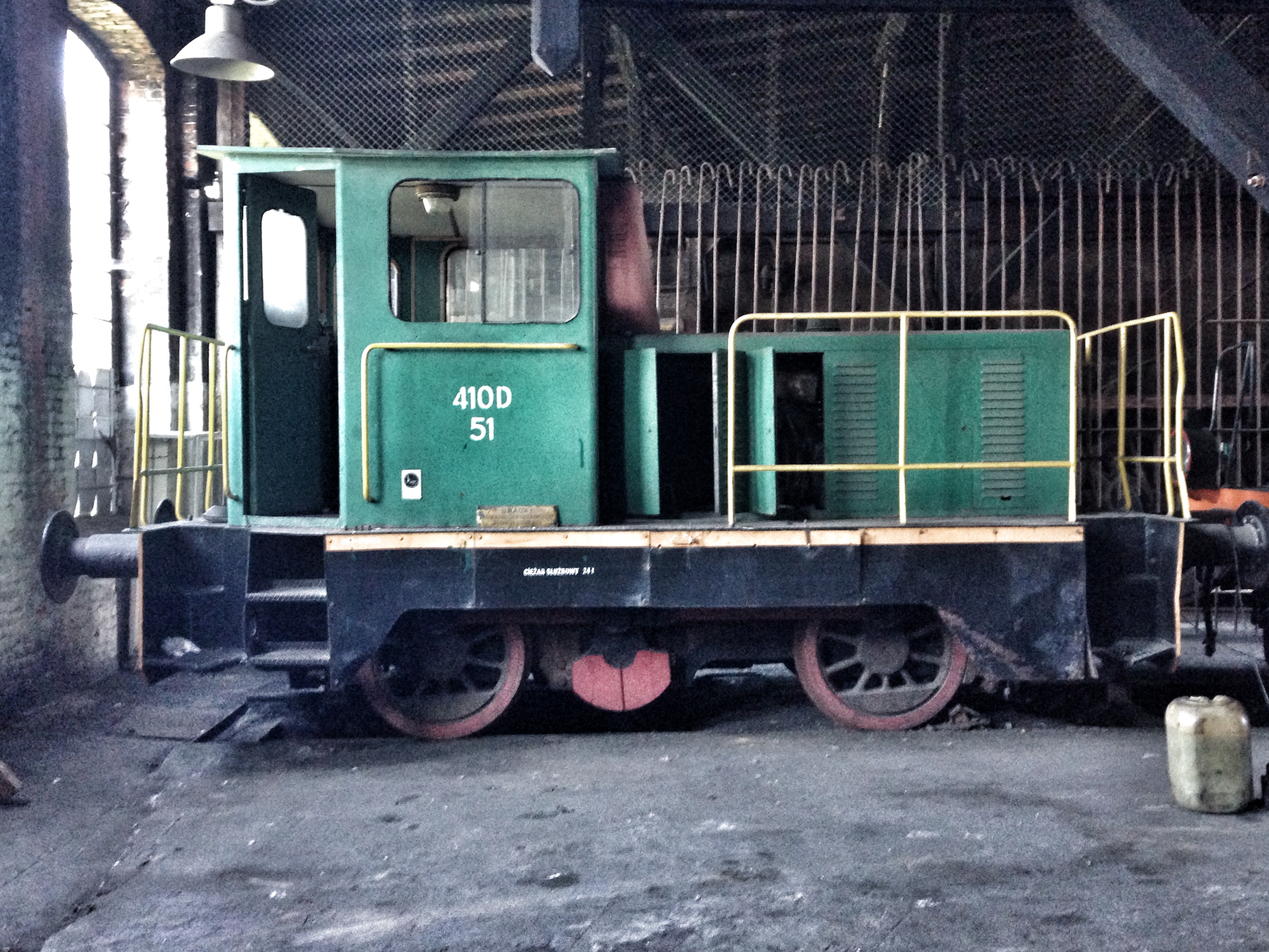
- 410D-51 from the collection of the Museum of Industry and Railways in Silesia
Specifications
- Engine type: SW400/L1
Performance figures
- Maximum speed: 22.4 km/h

The Zastal 410D is a diesel shunting locomotive produced by Zaodrzańskich Zakładach Przemysłu Metalowego im. M. Nowotki in Zielonej Górze. Designed to perform shunting operations on industrial sidings, a total of 51 examples were produced from 1973–1975.

== History ==
In 1969, the Technical Office of Zaodrzańskie Zakłady Przemysłu Metalowego im. M. Nowotki in Zielona Góra had finalized the technical design data for the 410D locomotive and after state approval, construction of a prototype unit was started (which was ready by 1972). Serial production began a year later in 1973. The 410D locomotives were intended to replace older domestic diesel shunting locomotives, notably the Ls40, Ls60 and Ls75.

== Technical Details ==
The locomotive's welded mainframe was made of rolled sections, had reinforced end-carriages with two sleeve buffers and spring-loaded draw hooks mounted to the frame. Axle blanks were made in an attached facility, where sliding blocks were integrated into the assembly. The truck is suspended using of a set of 4 flat springs, resting on two axles. The spoked wheels are recessed inside the locomotive body. The body is made of welded steel sheets with an engine compartment and a single driver's cabin. There are platforms for locomotive service personnel located on both sides of the engine compartment.

The locomotive has a 110 hp SW400 / L1 engine manufactured by the Diesel Engine Factory, Andrychów. Power is transmitted through the ZM 130 torque converter to a 101PHA mechanical transmission. During the operating life of the 410D locomotive, malfunctions were found in the hydromechanical torque converter and the electromagnetic clutch control. The power generated by the locomotive also was found to be insufficient. These manufacturing defects led to a lack of orders and production of the series was stopped.

== Preserved Units ==
Solitary examples of this series of locomotive continued to be used in Poland as of 2014, including a broad-gauge unit, number 410D-001 at the cargo terminal in Braniewo and number 410D-35 in the Romanowo quarry.

One locomotive of this series, number 410D-51, is in the collection of the Museum of Industry and Railways of Silesia in Jaworzynie Śląskiej. It is the final unit to be produced in the series; it was purchased by the Carpet Factory in Kowary in 1975. In 2002, it was sold to the Śnieżka Forest Inspectorate, where it was used on the siding of the State Forests in Kostrzycy. In 2005, it was bought by the museum in Jaworzyna. Number 410D-10 locomotive has been preserved at the locomotive depot in Jarocin.

== See also ==
- List of rolling stock used in Poland
- Incomplete factory list of 410D locomotives
