= Fablok Ls60 =

Polish shunting diesel locomotive

Ls60
Type and origin
- Power type: Diesel-mechanical
- Builder: Fablok; Zastal
- Build date: 1961 - 1971
- Total produced: 562
Specifications
- Configuration
  - AAR: B
  - UIC: B
- Gauge: 1,435 mm (4 ft 8 1/2 in)
- Wheel diameter: 850 mm (2 ft 9.465 in)
- Wheelbase: 2,500 mm (8 ft 2.425 in)
- Length: 5,950 mm (19 ft 6.252 in)
- Width: 2,970 mm (9 ft 8.929 in)
- Axle load: 8 t
- Loco weight: 16 t
- Fuel type: Diesel
- Fuel capacity: 120 l
- Prime mover: S-324HL
- Cylinders: 4
- Transmission: mechanical
- Loco brake: mechanical
- Couplers: Screw coupler
Performance figures
- Maximum speed: 11 km/h (7 mph)
- Power output: 44 kW (59.0 hp)
- Tractive effort: 45 kN (10,116.40 lbf)
Career
- Operators: Industrial companies
- Delivered: 1961

Ls60 is a Polish diesel-mechanical shunter locomotive being a development of Ls40 locomotive. Built in 1961 to 1964 by Fablok and built in 1964 to 1971 by Zastal, it was intended for lightweight shunting duties around industrial plants.
