= DRG Class 89.0 =

Goods train tank engine

DRG Class 89.0 (2nd) PKP TKh5
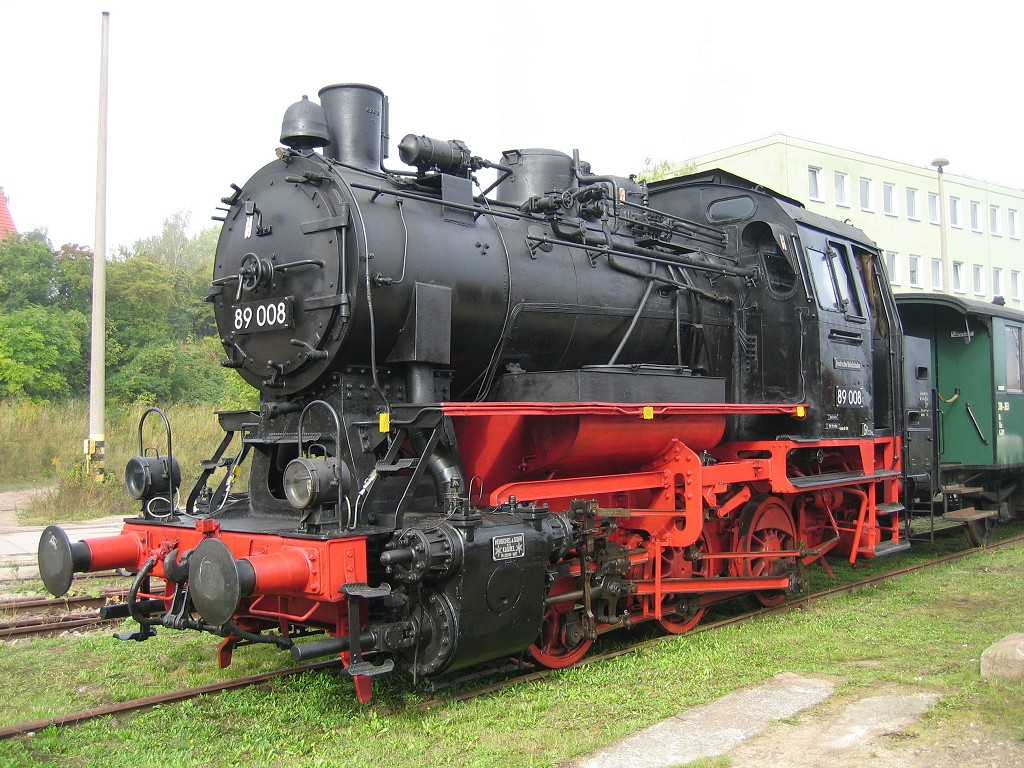
- 89 008 in Schwerin
Type and origin
- Power type: Steam
- Builder: Berliner Maschinenbau (3); Henschel & Sohn (7)
- Build date: 1934 (6 units); 1937 (4 units)
- Total produced: 10
Specifications
- Configuration
  - Whyte: 0-6-0T
  - UIC: 001–003: C n2t; 004–010: C h2t
  - German: Gt 33.15
- Gauge: 1,435 mm (4 ft 8 1/2 in)
- Driver dia.: 1,100 mm (3 ft 7 1/4 in)
- Wheelbase
  - Axle spacing (Asymmetrical): 1,650 mm (5 ft 5 in) +; 1,650 mm (5 ft 5 in) =
  - Engine: 3,300 mm (10 ft 9 7/8 in)
- Length
  - Over headstocks: 8,300 mm (27 ft 2 3/4 in)
  - Over buffers: 9,600 mm (31 ft 6 in)
- Height: 4,165 mm (13 ft 8 in)
- Axle load: 001–003: 15.3 t (15.1 long tons; 16.9 short tons); 004–010: 15.5 t (15.3 long tons; 17.1 short tons)
- Adhesive weight: 001–003: 45.8 t (45.1 long tons; 50.5 short tons); 004–010: 46.6 t (45.9 long tons; 51.4 short tons)
- Empty weight: 001–003: 35.3 t (34.7 long tons; 38.9 short tons); 004–010: 36.2 t (35.6 long tons; 39.9 short tons)
- Service weight: 001–003: 45.8 t (45.1 long tons; 50.5 short tons); 004–010: 46.6 t (45.9 long tons; 51.4 short tons)
- Fuel type: Coal
- Fuel capacity: 2.6 t (2.6 long tons; 2.9 short tons)
- Water cap.: 001–003: 4.5 m^{3} (990 imp gal; 1,190 US gal); 004–010: 4.8 m^{3} (1,060 imp gal; 1,270 US gal)
- Firebox
  - Grate area: 1.42 m^{2} (15.3 sq ft)
- Boiler
  - Pitch: 2,800 mm (9 ft 2 1/4 in)
  - Tube plates: 2,800 mm (9 ft 2 1/4 in)
  - Small tubes: 001–003: 44.5 mm (1 3/4 in), 219 off; 004–010: 44.5 mm (1 3/4 in), 100 off
  - Large tubes: 001–003: —; 004–010: 118 mm (4 5/8 in), 28 off
- Boiler pressure: 14 bar (14.3 kgf/cm^{2}; 203 psi)
- Heating surface
  - Firebox: 6.11 m^{2} (65.8 sq ft)
  - Tubes: 001–003: 76.1 m^{2} (819 sq ft); 004–010: 34.75 m^{2} (374.0 sq ft)
  - Flues: 001–003: —; 004–010: 27.0 m^{2} (291 sq ft)
  - Total surface: 001–003: 82.21 m^{2} (884.9 sq ft); 004–010: 67.86 m^{2} (730.4 sq ft)
- Superheater
  - Heating area: 001–003: —; 004–010: 24.1 m^{2} (259 sq ft)
- Cylinders: Two, outside
- Cylinder size: 420 mm × 550 mm (16 9/16 in × 21 5/8 in)
- Loco brake: Knorr automatic, single-chamber, compressed-air brakes
- Parking brake: Counterweight brake
Performance figures
- Maximum speed: 45 km/h (28 mph)
- Indicated power: 001–003: 320 PS (235 kW; 316 hp); 004–010: 525 PS (386 kW; 518 hp)
Career
- Operators: Deutsche Reichsbahn
- Numbers: 89 001 – 89 010
- Retired: 1968

The DRG Class 89.0 was a goods train tank engine of standard design (see Einheitsdampflokomotive) built for the Deutsche Reichsbahn (DRG).

== History ==
It was the smallest standard locomotive in service with the Reichsbahn. Whilst numbers 89 001 - 89 003 were supplied as saturated steam engines, the remaining seven were superheated locomotives. After the Second World War half the machines went to the Polish State Railway (PKP) and half to the East German Deutsche Reichsbahn (DR). The last engine 89 008 was taken out of service in 1968 at Dresden-Altstadt locomotive depot (Bahnbetriebswerk or Bw) and remains preserved in the Dresden Transport Museum as a heritage locomotive. Since 1992 the engine has been in the ownership of the Mecklenburg Railway Friends (Mecklenburgischen Eisenbahnfreunde) in Schwerin.

Although this engine was never in service with the Deutsche Bundesbahn, it is in the DB's transport directory.

== Model railway ==
A Z scale model of the Class 89.0 locomotive has been used as the symbol for this model track gauge.

There has also been a model by the firm of Märklin for decades in H0 scale. The DB variant of this model has no real prototype, however, because this engine was never in the DB's fleet.

== See also ==
- List of DRG locomotives and railbuses
