= Liberation Class =

Class of 120 British-built 2-8-0 locomotives built for the UNRRA

Liberation class 2-8-0 locomotive
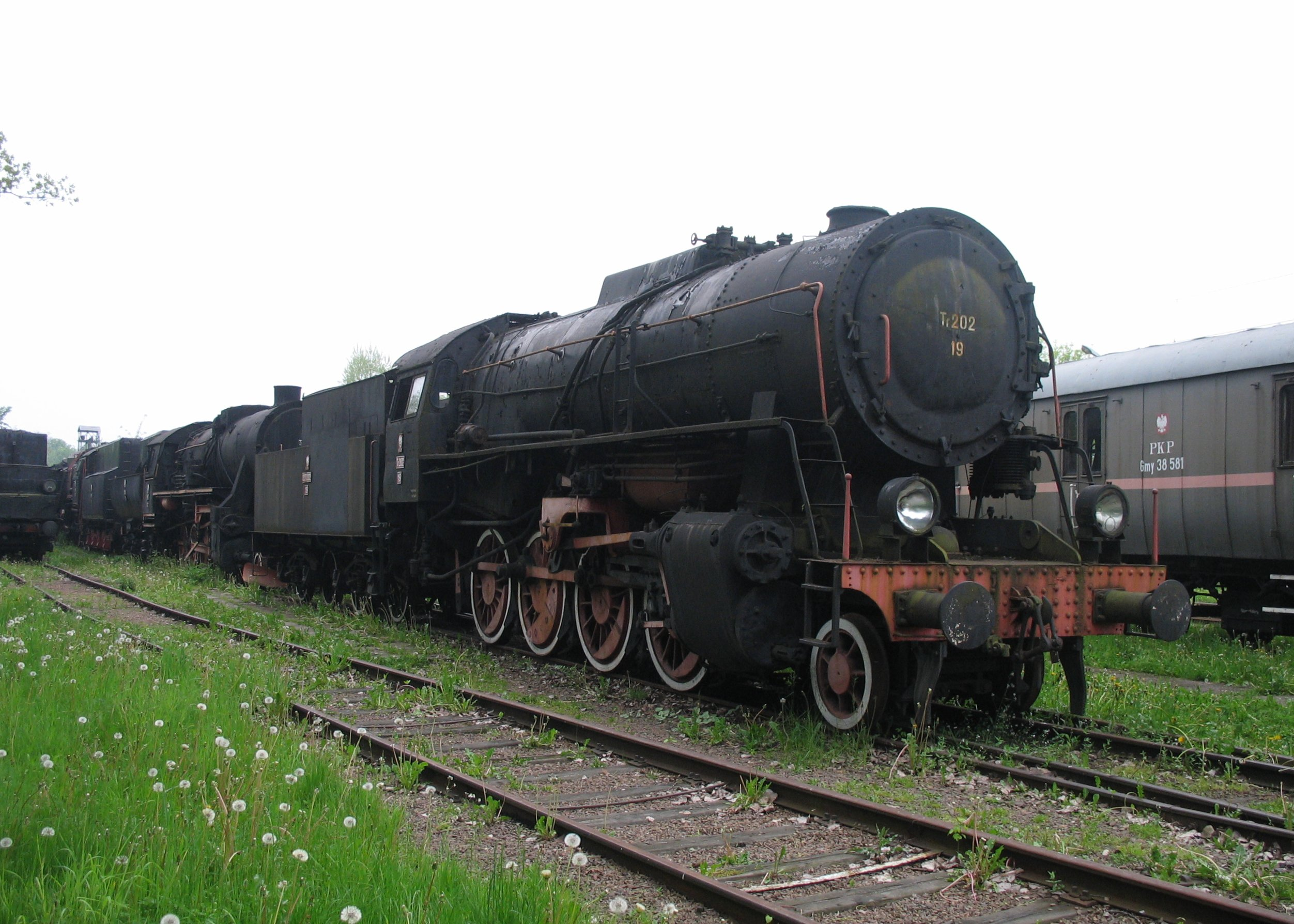
- Polish Tr202-19 in a heritage park in Chabówka.
Type and origin
- Power type: Steam
- Builder: Vulcan Foundry (120), Đuro Đaković (10)
- Serial number: VF 5357–5476
- Build date: 1946 (120), 1957–58 (10)
Specifications
- Configuration
  - Whyte: 2-8-0
  - UIC: 1′D h2
- Gauge: 1,435 mm (4 ft 8 1/2 in) standard gauge
- Driver dia.: 4 ft 9 1/8 in (1.451 m)
- Water cap.: 5,500 imp gal (25,000 L; 6,600 US gal)
- Boiler pressure: 232 psi (1.60 MPa)
- Cylinders: Two, outside
- Cylinder size: 21.625 in × 28 in (549 mm × 711 mm)
Performance figures
- Tractive effort: 45,200 lbf (201.1 kN)
Career
- Operators: CFL; ČSD; JŽ; PKP
- Numbers: CFL: 4701–4710; ČSD: 459.001–459.015; JŽ: 38.001–38.075; PKP: Tr202.1–Tr202.30

The Liberation Class was a class of 2-8-0 steam locomotives designed for heavy freight work in post-Second World War Europe. 120 were built by the Vulcan Foundry of Newton-le-Willows in 1946.

In 1943 when the rehabilitation of Europe was already under consideration the Locomotive Manufacturers’ Association was asked by the Ministry of Supply, at the request of the Technical Advisory Committee on Inland Transport of the British and Allied Governments in London, to prepare designs of an engine more powerful than the “ Austerity ”’ locomotives, and suitable for universal use on the railways of Europe. It was specified that the proposed locomotive should have a tractive effort of between 40,000 Ib. and 50,000 Ib., a boiler having a wide fire-box, with a grate area of 40 to 50 square feet, an axle load not less than 18 tons, a wheel base suitable for curves of 330ft. radius, and that the engine and tender should be built within the limitations of the International Rail Gauge.

== Design ==
They shared some features with the earlier WD Austerity 2-8-0 and WD Austerity 2-10-0 which in turn had been based on the LMS Stanier Class 8F. They were however built to the continental loading gauge, but the design was intended to last, not a short-term kriegslok.

== Distribution ==
Ten went to Luxembourg and the rest to Eastern Europe. The United Nations Relief and Rehabilitation Administration distributed them as follows:

- 10 to as Luxembourg as CFL class 47
- 65 to Yugoslavia as JŽ class 38; Đuro Đaković built 10 more 1957–1958
- 30 to Poland as PKP class Tr202
- 15 Czechoslovakia as ČSD class 459.0

== Preservation ==
One Liberation class locomotive remains in Kraków, Poland Tr202-19 built in 1946. A second (also not in working condition) is in Jaworzyna Śląska, Lower Silesia, South West Poland Tr202-28.
