= Prussian G 5.4 =

Prussian G 5.4 DRG Class 54.8–10
Type and origin
- Build date: 1901–1910
- Total produced: 767
Specifications
- Configuration
  - Whyte: 2-6-0
  - UIC: 1′C n2v
- Gauge: 1,435 mm (4 ft 8 1/2 in)
- Leading dia.: 1,000 mm
- Driver dia.: 1,350 mm
- Length
  - Over beams: 16,168 mm
- Axle load: 15.3 t
- Adhesive weight: 44.0 t
- Service weight: 55.1 t
- Water cap.: 12.0/15.0 m^{3}
- Boiler pressure: 12 bar
- Heating surface
  - Firebox: 2.29 m^{2}
  - Evaporative: 137.00 m^{2}
- Cylinders: 2
- Cylinder size: 500/750 mm
- Piston stroke: 630 mm
Performance figures
- Maximum speed: 65 km/h
- Indicated power: 574/750 kW
Career
- Numbers: DRG 54 801–981, 985-1079, 1083, 1084
- Retired: 1948

The Prussian G 5.4 was a German goods train locomotive with a compound engine. Due to its top speed of 65 km/h it was also used on passenger services. The G 5.4, like the G 5.3, differed from the G 5.1 and G 5.2 in having a shorter wheelbase and higher boiler pitch. In addition, the Krauss-Helmholtz bogies enabled its riding qualities to be improved, especially at higher speeds. Between 1901 and 1910 a total of about 760 vehicles of the Class G 5.4 were built for the Prussian state railways. The last 25 locomotives were fitted once again with an Adams axle (see Prussian G 5.5).

Other railways companies also procured this class:

- Hafenbahn Frankfurt/M: 3 units in 1908, which were taken over by the Prussian state railways in 1910.
- Royal Prussian Military Railway: One locomotive in 1905, taken over by the Prussian state railways in 1919.
- Lübeck-Büchen railway: Three locomotives in 1906 and 1909, retired by 1936.
- Grand Duchy of Mecklenburg Friedrich-Franz Railway: Nine locomotives, actually G 5.5s, see Mecklenburg G 5.4.
- Imperial Railways in Alsace-Lorraine: Three locomotives in 1912, G 5.5, see Alsace-Lorraine G 5.5.

In 1923 the Reichsbahn took over 371 locomotives into its renumbering plan as 54 503-517 and 54 801-1156; in 1925 another 278 vehicles were incorporated as 54 801–981, 985-1079, 1083 and 1084. Some 22 examples were converted during the 1920s to superheated compounds. During the Second World War a number of G 5.4 and G 5.5 came into the Reichsbahn fleet from Poland and Lithuania as 54 1101-1218 and 54 1220-1223. The last G 5.4 in Germany was retired by 1951.

The vehicles were coupled with Prussian tenders of classes pr 3 T 12 or pr 3 T 15.

== See also ==
- List of DRG locomotives and railbuses
- List of Prussian locomotives and railbuses
