= PKP class SM48 =

Polish diesel locomotive class

SM48
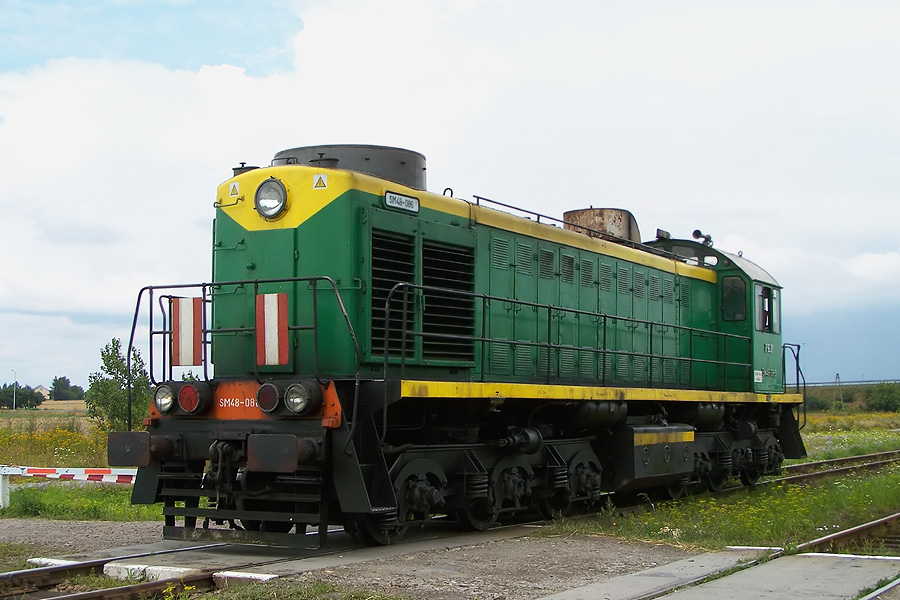
- SM48 locomotive
Type and origin
- Power type: Diesel-electric
- Builder: USSR
- Model: ТЭМ2 (TEM2)
- Build date: 1976
Specifications
- Configuration
  - UIC: Co′Co′
- Gauge: 1,435 mm (4 ft 8 1/2 in) standard gauge
- Driver dia.: 1,050 mm (41.34 in)
- Length: 16.97 m (55 ft 8 in)
- Width: (?)
- Height: 4.44 m (14 ft 7 in)
- Loco weight: 116 t (114 long tons; 128 short tons)
- Fuel type: Diesel
- Fuel capacity: 4,590 L (1,010 imp gal; 1,210 US gal)
- Prime mover: PD1M
- Cylinders: 6
- Transmission: Diesel electric
- Loco brake: Matrosow
- Train brakes: Air
Performance figures
- Maximum speed: 100 km/h (62 mph)
- Power output: 883 kW (1,184 hp)
- Tractive effort: 372.65 kN (83,780 lbf)
Career
- Operators: PKP
- Class: SM48
- Nicknames: Walentyna; Tamara

SM48 is the name for class of Soviet diesel locomotives operating in Poland for PKP. The original designation was ТЭМ2 (TEM2), and was the Soviet-built version of the ALCO RSD-1.

== History ==
The SM48 was originally put into service on the eastern Polish railways, where 1,524 mm (5 ft) Russian broad gauge railways were still in use. It turned out that the locomotive fitted well within the structure gauge on standard gauge lines.

=== Introduction ===
Since 1976, PKP have bought 130 SM48 locomotives. There are also locomotives in service with other Polish operators: PCC Rail, PTKiGK Zabrze, Kopalnia Piasku Kotlarnia.

== Modernizations ==
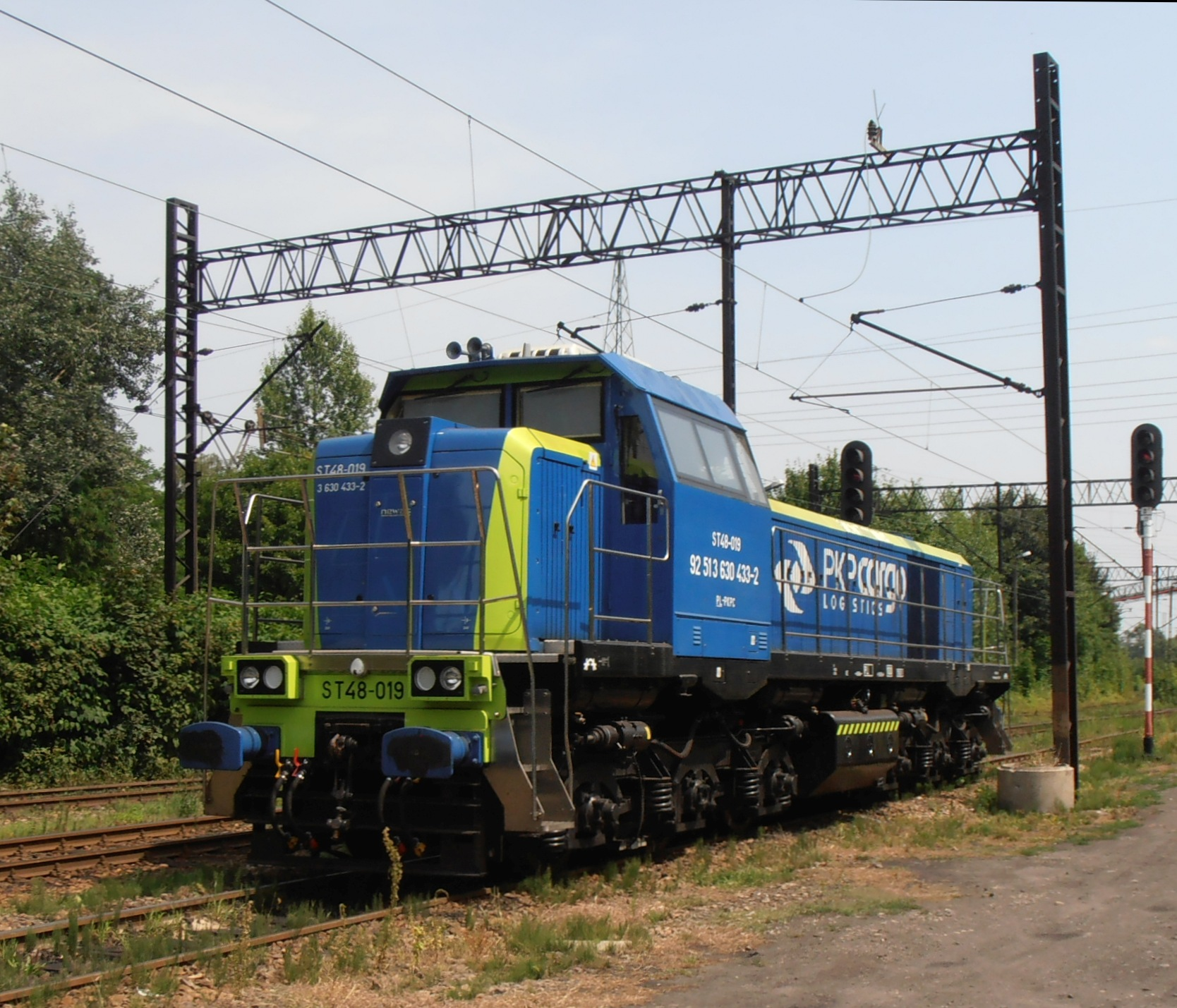
Newag 15D, owned by PKP Cargo, bearing the ST48-019 marking.

Since 2010, several locomotives underwent modernization to Newag 15D/16D standard. (PKP Cargo classes them as ST48.)

In 2017, Pesa offered their version of modernization, designated 19D.

In 2021, Tabor Dębica offered their version of modernization, designated 20D.

== Nicknames ==
- Tamara – from an original USSR name "TEM2"
- Walentyna – from a popular female name in USSR

== See also ==
- Polish locomotives designation
