= Bryansk Machine-Building Plant =

Heavy industry company in Bryansk, Russia

Coordinates: 53°17′59″N 34°19′33″E

- Type: Joint-stock company
- Founded: 1873
- Headquarters: Bryansk, Russia
- Products: diesel engines, marine B&W licensed, machinery, metal parts, locomotives
- Revenue: $334 million (2014)
- Parent: Transmashholding
- Website: www.ukbmz.ru

Bryansk Machine-Building Plant (Russian: Брянский машиностроительный завод) is a company based in Bryansk, Russia and established in 1873. It is part of Transmashholding.

The Bryansk Machine-Building Plant is the oldest builder of transportation equipment in Russia. It produces diesel locomotives, marine diesel engines (diesel B&W licensed), and specialized railroad equipment such as five-car refrigerator trains.
