= PKP class Tp109 =

Designation for the Russian CzWP/K series freight steam locomotive

Tp109
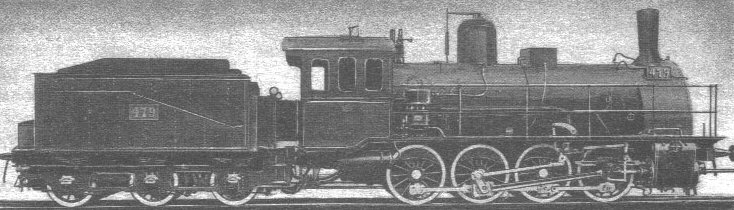
Type and origin
- Power type: steam
- Builder: Kolomna Factory
- Build date: 1909–1911
Specifications
- Configuration
  - Whyte: 0-8-0
  - AAR: D h2G
- Carrying wheel diameter: 1,300 millimetres (51 in)
- Wheelbase: 4,200 millimetres (170 in)
- Length: 15,854 millimetres (624.2 in)
- Height: 4,280 millimetres (169 in)
- Axle load: 13.8 tonnes (13.6 long tons; 15.2 short tons)
- Empty weight: 39.0 tonnes (38.4 long tons; 43.0 short tons)
- Service weight: 53.5 tonnes (52.7 long tons; 59.0 short tons) (other sources: 56.6 tonnes (55.7 long tons; 62.4 short tons)
- Total weight: 92.5 tonnes (91.0 long tons; 102.0 short tons)
- Tender type: 15Cl
- Firebox
  - Grate area: 2.1 square metres (23 sq ft)
- Boiler pressure: 12 at
- Superheater
  - Heating area: 36.0 square metres (388 sq ft)
- Piston stroke: 650 millimetres (26 in)
Performance figures
- Maximum speed: 45 kilometres per hour (28 mph)

Tp109 was the designation for the Russian CzWP/K series freight steam locomotive (officially Cz^{WP}_{K}, Russian: Ч^{ВП}_{К}) used on the Polish State Railways (PKP). These locomotives were produced between 1909 and 1911 for the Warsaw–Vienna railway at the Kolomna works, in a total of 12 units, of which 6 later served on the PKP.

== History ==
Until the end of the 19th century, the Warsaw–Vienna railway, despite being on the territory of the Russian Empire, only used locomotives purchased from Western Europe. In 1895, it introduced four-axle freight steam locomotives with a D wheel arrangement. Initially, these were locomotives with a compound or twin-cylinder engine, powered by saturated steam, produced by Hanomag in Hanover (later designated as the Cz^{W}_{G} series). Starting in 1904, the Kharkiv works began producing similar locomotives with a compound engine for this railway (later known as the Cz^{W}_{Ch} series). Subsequently, the railway management decided to order more modern and efficient locomotives with superheated steam, based on the Cz^{W}_{Ch} type. Consequently, between 1909 and 1912, the Warsaw–Vienna railway purchased a total of 17 freight locomotives with superheaters in two versions: 12 units of a type developed at the Kolomna works and 5 units built in Kharkiv (later known as Cz^{WP}_{Ch}).

The Kolomna factory built a total of 12 locomotives, designated as type 113, with two produced in 1909, five in 1910, and five in 1911. From 1912, after the introduction of a unified classification system in Russia, these locomotives were designated as series Cz^{WP}_{K}, where Cz stood for a four-coupled axle locomotive, W for the model designed for the Warsaw–Vienna railway, P for the steam superheater, and K in the subscript indicating the manufacturer (Kolomna); the letter K was placed directly under WP.

== Construction ==
The freight steam locomotive featured a D axle arrangement, with a two-cylinder twin engine using superheated steam (configuration D h2). The boiler axis was at a height of 2,250 mm. The boiler contained 122 fire tubes (inner/outer diameter 44/49 mm) and 21 flues (125/133 mm). The boiler heating surface area was 116.3 m², (Note: The heating surface area is 116.3 m² according to all Polish sources. The value of 161.4 m² provided by Rakow (1995, p. 140) is possibly an error (similar to other Cz series locomotives described there), as the CzWP/K should have a reduced heating surface area due to the use of a superheater.) and the Schmidt superheater, of a simple design, had a surface area of 36 m². The boiler had a Crampton-type firebox, with a radial arch on the upper part of the firebox shell and a copper firebox. Typically for Russian locomotives, the locomotive had railings around the walkway encircling the boiler. The smokebox door was round, with a central lock and an external handle. A characteristic feature of the D axle configuration locomotives of the Warsaw–Vienna railway was the engineer’s cab with three windows on the side walls.

The internal frame was plate-constructed, with plates 28 mm thick, supported at four points by lower leaf springs. The driving axle was the third coupled axle, powered by a connecting rod with a crosshead with a single guide (a novelty compared to previous types). The engines had piston valves with a diameter of 150 mm and a Heusinger (Walschaerts) valve gear.

The locomotives were equipped with German-type fittings, including Strube injectors with a capacity of 180 l/min. On the boiler stand, in front of the engineer’s cab, there were Ramsbottom-pattern safety valves (German type), and additionally, a spring valve on the steam dome. The locomotives produced in 1909 were initially equipped with an air compressor and a Westinghouse automatic brake, but these could not be used effectively as the Warsaw–Vienna railway rolling stock had Hardy vacuum brakes or manual brakes, hence their installation was discontinued, and the locomotives were fitted with steam brakes.

The three-axle tender of the 15C1 series (Polish designation) had a capacity of 15 m³ of water and 8 tons of coal, with an empty weight of 16.2 tons and a service weight of 39 tons. The tender wheel diameter was 1,000 mm.

== Operation ==
The CzWP/K series locomotives were numbered 478 to 489 on the Warsaw–Vienna railway. (Note: The CzWP/Ch series locomotives received further numbers from 490 to 494 (Pokropiński (1986, p. 70); Rakow (1995, p. 140)).) They were adapted for a track gauge of 1,435 mm but could have their wheelsets changed to broad gauge (1,524 mm). These locomotives were used to haul the first heavy 40-car coal trains weighing 1,000 tons from Sosnowiec to Warsaw. During World War I, several locomotives were converted to a gauge of 1,524 mm and likely ended up on Russian railways.

After World War I, the Polish State Railways (PKP) received 6 CzWP/K series locomotives, designated as Tp109 following the introduction of a unified classification system in 1923. In the 1920s, they operated out of the Warsaw–Praga depot, and in the 1930s, they were transferred to the Katowice Directorate (Rybnik – 4 locomotives and Łazy – 1). It is possible that the sixth locomotive served as an industrial locomotive in Upper Silesia.

During World War II, 5 locomotives were taken over by Germany and used as the 55^{61} series, with numbers from 55,6131 to 55,6135. After the war, only one locomotive, Tp109-3, remained in Poland, serving in the Kraków Directorate of PKP under the new number Tp109-1, until it was scrapped in Jasło in 1963. One locomotive (former Tp109-1) ended up in Yugoslavia, where it was numbered 139-001. After the war, it was repatriated to Poland, but its further fate is unknown (only one Tp109 locomotive is listed in the PKP inventory). The fate of the remaining locomotives is also unknown.

== Bibliography ==
- Pokropiński, Bogdan (1986). "Parowóz serii Tp109". Młody Technik (in Polish). 2.
- Rakow, W.A. (1995). Łokomotiwy otieczestwiennych żeleznych dorog 1845-1955 (in Russian). Moscow: Moskwa. ISBN 5-277-00821-7.
