= PKP class MBxd2 =

Diesel railcar

MBxd2
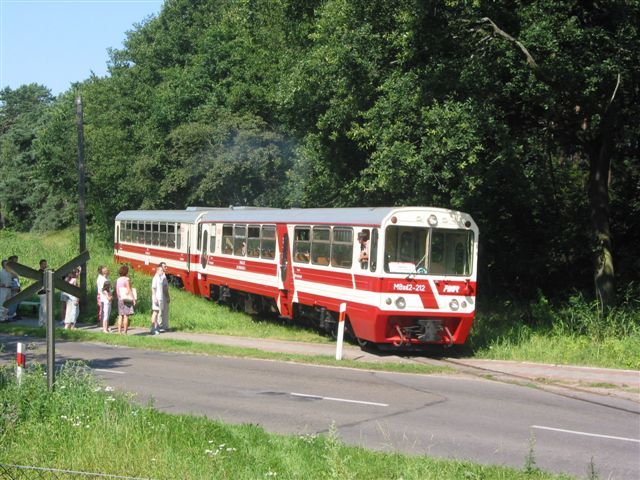
- MBxd2-212+Bxhpi in Jantar
- Stock type: diesel multiple unit
- Manufacturer: FAUR
- Assembly: Bucharest; Romania
- Constructed: 1984–1986
- Number built: 32
- Capacity: 60

Specifications
- Train length: 15,920 mm (627 in)
- Width: 2,400 mm (94 in)
- Height: 3,300 mm (130 in)
- Wheel diameter: 750 mm (30 in)
- Maximum speed: 1,000 mm: 60 km/h (37 mph); 750 mm: 40 km/h (25 mph)
- Weight: 24.4 t (24.0 long tons; 26.9 short tons)
- Engine type: D2156HMU
- Transmission: hydraulic 16HRS 5302-704

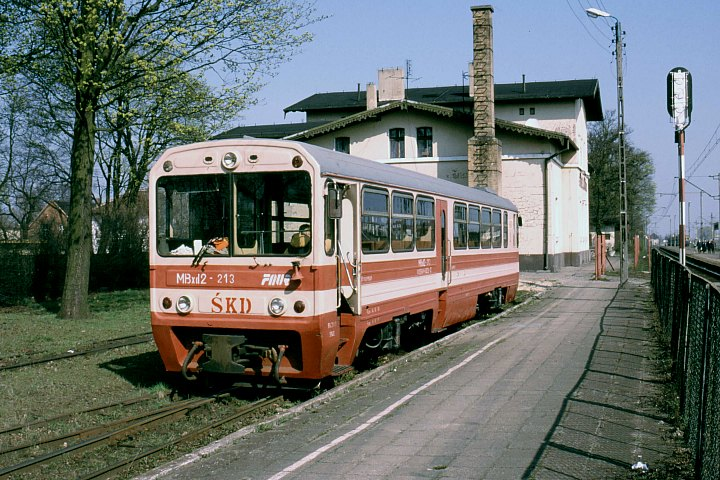
MBxd2-213 railcar of the Śmigiel railway station Narrow-Gauge Railway in Stare Bojanowo

MBxd2 (type A20D-P) is a narrow-gauge diesel railcar produced between 1984 and 1986 by the FAUR factory in Bucharest. A total of 32 units of this vehicle were built. The purchase and operation of MBxd2 railcars saved many narrow-gauge railway networks in Poland from closure. Due to their country of origin, MBxd2 railcars (as well as their trailer cars – the Bxhpi series) are often referred to as "Rumuni" (Romanians).

== History ==
=== Origins ===
Narrow-gauge railways in Poland had been gradually phased out since the 1950s. This process was driven by various factors, including the development of motorized transport. Another contributing factor to the decline and restrictions on narrow-gauge railway operations was the poor condition of infrastructure and rolling stock, much of which was outdated, with some dating back to before World War II. To prevent the complete liquidation of narrow-gauge railways, in 1983, the Ministry of Transport purchased 32 railcars later designated as the MBxd2 series, along with 100 trailer cars of the Bxhpi series, from the 23 August Works in Bucharest, Romania. The trailer cars were specifically designed to pair with the railcars, forming the A20D-P diesel multiple unit. This transaction was preceded by the delivery of two test vehicles.

=== Production and testing ===
In 1984, the Romanian factory built two test railcars, which were sent to Gryfice and Piaseczno. These prototypes differed slightly in appearance from later units, notably lacking the corrugated stiffening ribs on the sidewalls. During testing, numerous defects were identified and subsequently corrected in the production models. A total of 12 motor railcars with a 1,000 mm track gauge and 20 units with a 750 mm gauge were produced and delivered between 1984 and 1987. The railcars designed for different track gauges varied not only in the width of their bogies but also in the gear ratio used in the reduction gearbox.

=== Operation ===
==== 750 mm gauge ====
Fleet number	Factory number	Inventory number	Year of production	Status	History
210	25114	00-390044 820-8	1986	Scrapped in 1996	Nowy Dwór Gdański Wąskotorowy railway station (1986–1996)
211	25115	00-390044 821-6	1986	Scrapped in 1996	Nowy Dwór Gdański Wąskotorowy railway station (1986–1996)
212	25116	00-390044 822-4	1986	Operational	Nowy Dwór Gdański Wąskotorowy railway station (1986–1996) Ełk Narrow Gauge Railway (1996–2004) Nowy Dwór Gdański Wąskotorowy railway station (since 2004)
213	25117	00-390044 823-2	1986	Sold to the Czech Republic in 2006	Lisewo Wąskotorowe railway station (1986–1993) Nowy Dwór Gdański Wąskotorowy railway station (1993–1996) Śmigiel railway station (1996–2006)
214	25118	00-390044 824-0	1986	Withdrawn	Krośniewice railway station (since 1986)
215	25119	00-390044 825-7	1986	Withdrawn	Krośniewice railway station (1986–2020) Rogów Narrow Gauge Railway (since 2020)
216	25192	00-390044 826-5	1986	Operational	Opalenica Wąskotorowa railway station (1986–1996) Śmigiel railway station (1996–1999) Pleszew Wąskotorowy railway station (since 1999)
217	25193	00-390044 827-3	1986	Withdrawn	Krośniewice railway station (since 1986)
218	25194	00-390044 828-1	1986	Operational	Śmigiel railway station (since 1986)
219	25195	00-390044 829-9	1986	Withdrawn	Krośniewice railway station (since 1986)
220	?	00-390044 830-7	1986	Operational	Lisewo Wąskotorowe railway station (1986–1993) Nowy Dwór Gdański Wąskotorowy railway station (1993–1996) Ełk Narrow Gauge Railway (since 1996)
221	?	00-390044 831-5	1986	Scrapped in 1996	Lisewo Wąskotorowe railway station (1986–1993) Nowy Dwór Gdański Wąskotorowy railway station (1993–1996)
222	?	00-390044 832-3	1986	Operational	Śmigiel railway station (since 1986)
223	?	00-390044 833-1	1986	Sold to the Czech Republic in 2005	Śmigiel railway station (1986–2001) Bytom Rozbark (2001–2003) Rudy railway station (2003–2005) Stanica Wąskotorowa railway station (2005)
224	?	00-390044 834-9	1986	Operational	Krośniewice railway station (since 1986)
225	?	00-390044 835-6	1986	Withdrawn	Opalenica Wąskotorowa railway station (1986–1996) Ełk Narrow Gauge Railway (1996–2014) Koszalin Wąskotorowy railway station (since 2014)
226	?	00-390044 836-4	1986	Operational	Śmigiel railway station (since 1986)
227	?	00-390044 837-2	1986	Scrapped in 1997	Opalenica Wąskotorowa railway station (1986–1996) Ełk Narrow Gauge Railway (1996–1997)
228	?	00-390044 838-9	1986	Sold to Romania in 2004	Opalenica Wąskotorowa railway station (1986–1996) Śmigiel railway station (1996–2003) Środa Wielkopolska Miasto railway station (2003–2004)
229	?	00-390044 839-8	1986	Scrapped in 2013	Krośniewice railway station (1986–2000) Środa Wielkopolska Miasto railway station (2000–2001) Śmigiel railway station (2001–2013)

==== 1,000 mm gauge ====
Fleet number	Factory number	Inventory number	Year of production	Status	History
301	24962	00-390044 803-0	1984	Operational	Gryfice Wąskotorowe railway station (since 1985)
302	24979	00-390044 804-8	1984	Withdrawn	Piaseczno Miasto Wąskotorowe railway station (1985–1988) Koszalin Wąskotorowy railway station (1988) Białogard Wąskotorowy railway station (1988–1992) Dobra Nowogardzkie railway station (1992–2001) Piaseczno Miasto Wąskotorowe railway station (since 2001)
303	25071	00-390044 805-5	1985	Sold to the Czech Republic in 2005	Koszalin Wąskotorowy railway station (1985) Białogard Wąskotorowy railway station (1985–1988) Koszalin Wąskotorowy railway station (1988–2005)
304	25072	00-390044 806-3	1985	Operational	Koszalin Wąskotorowy railway station (1985–2001) Dobra Nowogardzkie railway station (2001–2004) Nowy Dwór Gdański Wąskotorowy railway station (since 2004)
305	25073	00-390044 807-1	1985	Sold to the Czech Republic in 2005	Piaseczno Miasto Wąskotorowe railway station (1985–1988) Koszalin Wąskotorowy railway station (1988–2005)
306	25074	00-390044 808-9	1985	Scrapped in 1996	Dobra Nowogardzkie railway station (1985–1996)
307	25075	00-390044 809-7	1985	Operational	Dobra Nowogardzkie railway station (1985–2008) Koszalin Wąskotorowy railway station (since 2008)
308	25076	00-390044 810-5	1985	Withdrawn	Gryfice Wąskotorowe railway station (1985–1987) Dobra Nowogardzkie railway station (since 1987)
309	25077	00-390044 811-3	1985	Scrapped in 1996	Gryfice Wąskotorowe railway station (1985–1989) Dobra Nowogardzkie railway station (1989–1996)
310	25078	00-390044 812-1	1985	Operational	Gryfice Wąskotorowe railway station (since 1985)
311	25190	00-390044 813-9	1986	Withdrawn	Gryfice Wąskotorowe railway station (1986–2001) MKW Gryfice (2001–2014) Bytom Karb Wąskotorowy railway station (since 2014)
312	25191	00-390044 814-7	1986	Scrapped in 1999	Gryfice Wąskotorowe railway station (1986–1999)

== Construction ==
=== Body ===
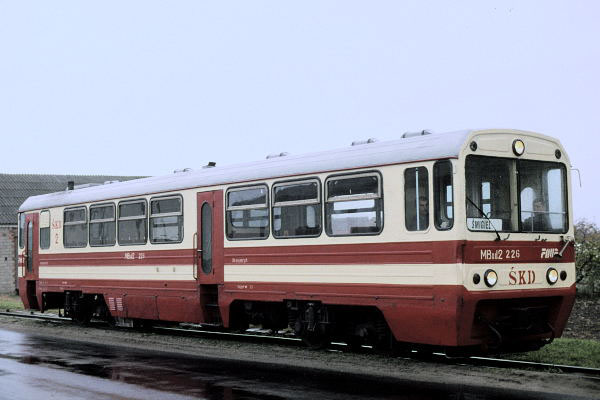
MBxd2 226 in Ziemin, view from the side

The body is self-supporting, made of steel. Cold-formed profiles were used in the construction, which were then covered with sheet metal. Both ends of the vehicle featured a control cabin. Each side had two pairs of doors: one pair leading to the control cabin and the other for passenger access. On each side wall, there were seven windows, each 1,170 mm wide; the upper part of the window could be tilted, similar to the lower deck of standard-gauge Bhp-type carriages.

=== Interior ===
The interior consisted of a vestibule and two compartments: a smaller one with 15 seats and a larger one with 24 seats. The larger compartment contained a toilet and a stove. The seating arrangement was 2+1, typical for narrow-gauge passenger cars. The seats were made of wooden slats. Additionally, the interior was equipped with luggage racks, waste bins, and handles for standing passengers.

=== Rolling chassis and bogies ===
The wagon was mounted on two double-axle bogies with double suspension. However, this suspension had a major flaw – it caused excessive rocking of the vehicle over track irregularities. The vehicle was equipped with a Knorr brake system that braked all the axles of the wagon, as well as sandboxes on the driving bogie, which dropped sand in the direction of travel onto the first axle’s wheels. The rolling chassis housed 12ES180 type rechargeable batteries with a capacity of 180 A and 24 V voltage, fuel and air tanks for compressors, and heat exchangers.

=== Powertrain ===
The unit was powered by a diesel engine, the D2156HMU, produced by the Hungarian company RABA (known for manufacturing engines for Ikarus buses, among others). The engine had a power output of 192 hp at 2,100 rpm, which theoretically allowed the vehicle to tow up to two trailers. However, due to the poor cooling of the engine, only one trailer could be attached to the motorized wagon. The power was transmitted through a 16HRS hydraulic transmission, initially designed for construction machinery.

=== Control devices ===
The controller had eight drive positions and a neutral position. In addition, the control panel featured a reverser for changing the direction of travel and a gear shift lever. The control panel also had indicators for monitoring and measurement purposes.

== Livery ==
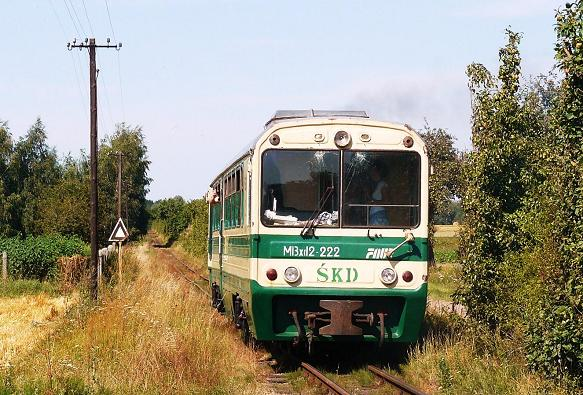
MBxd2-222 in an unusual livery

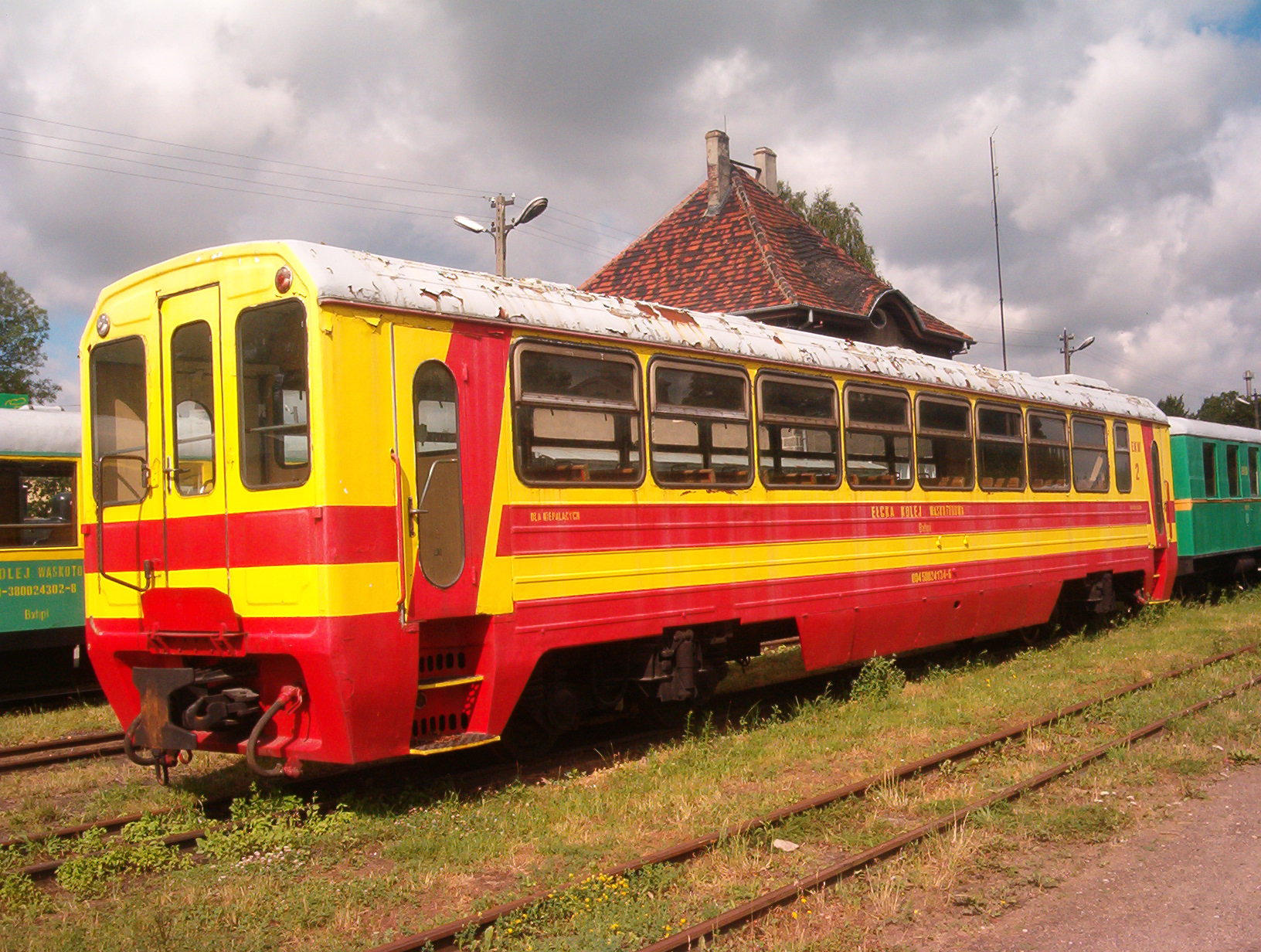
Railcar in the livery of the Ełk Narrow Gauge Railway

The most distinctive livery for the MBxd2 wagons (as well as the Bxhpi trailers) was the factory design, featuring red and cream stripes with red doors. The central stripe on the front of the wagon had a V-shaped bend at a 45° angle downward. During their service at WMD Śmigiel, a simplified livery was used—without the red stripe bend on the front. For vehicle MBxd2-222, instead of red, green was used. From 2002 onwards, the Ełk Narrow-Gauge Railway adopted a yellow color instead of the gray/ivory shade.

== Letter designation ==
The vehicle carries the type designation A20D-P, which was assigned by the manufacturer due to the key features of the design:

- A – Automotoare – from Romanian: motorized wagon or diesel multiple unit;
- 20 – the number of tens in the engine power value; here approximately 200 hp;
- D – powered by a diesel engine;
- P – designed specifically for the Polish market.

On the Polish State Railways, the vehicle was given the alphanumeric designation of the MBxd2 series, meaning:

- M – motorized wagon;
- B – second class;
- x – four-axle;
- d – powered by a diesel engine;
- 2 – equipped with a hydromechanical transmission.
