= English Electric EL.100 =

EL.100
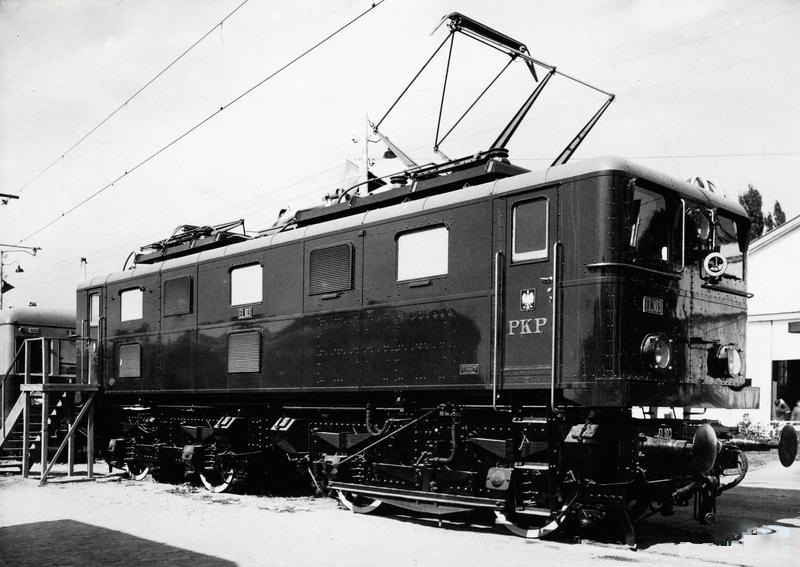
- EL.103 locomotive
Type and origin
- Power type: Electric
- Builder: English Electric, Fabryka Lokomotyw
- Build date: 1933–1936; 1939
- Total produced: 6
Specifications
- Configuration
  - UIC: Bo′Bo′
- Driver dia.: 1,220 mm (4 ft 0 in)
- Length: 13,600 mm (44 ft 7 in)
- Width: 2,896 mm (9 ft 6.0 in)
- Height: 4,572 mm (15 ft 0 in)
- Adhesive weight: 18.8 t (18.5 long tons; 20.7 short tons)
- Loco weight: 75.2 t (74.0 long tons; 82.9 short tons)
- Current pickup(s): Pantograph
- Engine type: 4 x MV 185
- Transmission: 69:22
- Loco brake: Westinghouse
Performance figures
- Maximum speed: 100 km/h (62 mph)
- Power output: 1,352 kW (1,813 hp); 1,648 kW (2,210 hp)
- Tractive effort: 169 kN (38,000 lbf)
Career
- Operators: PKP
- Class: EL.100
- Locale: Poland
- First run: 15 December 1936
- Retired: 1964
- Scrapped: 1968

English Electric EL.100 (Polish designations EP01, EL.100, E100 and E01) was a class of electric locomotives used by the Polish State Railways. Originally built and designed by English Electric as a line engine, it was used in Poland mainly for shunting, as a supplemental engine to ferry steam locomotives across the Warsaw Cross-City Line tunnel, between Pruszków and Otwock. It was the first electric locomotive used in Poland.

First two engines were bought in the United Kingdom in 1933, additional four were license-built in First Locomotives Factory in Chrzanów, with the electrical machinery imported from England and mechanical part produced locally. The six locomotives, named EL.101 through EL.106, entered service on 15 December 1936. In early 1939 parts for additional four locomotives were ordered in the United Kingdom. Assembled for delivery in August 1939, they were captured in Gdynia by German forces during the Invasion of Poland and never completed.

During World War II, EL.103 was destroyed in 1939 and EL.101 was damaged beyond repair in 1944. Out of remaining four locomotives confiscated by the Nazis only EL.106 was returned to Poland and served in various capacities until 1964, under a new designation of EP01. EL.102, EL.104 and EL.105 remained in Germany and were scrapped in Desching some time after 1958.
