= PKP class Lxd2 =

Lxd2
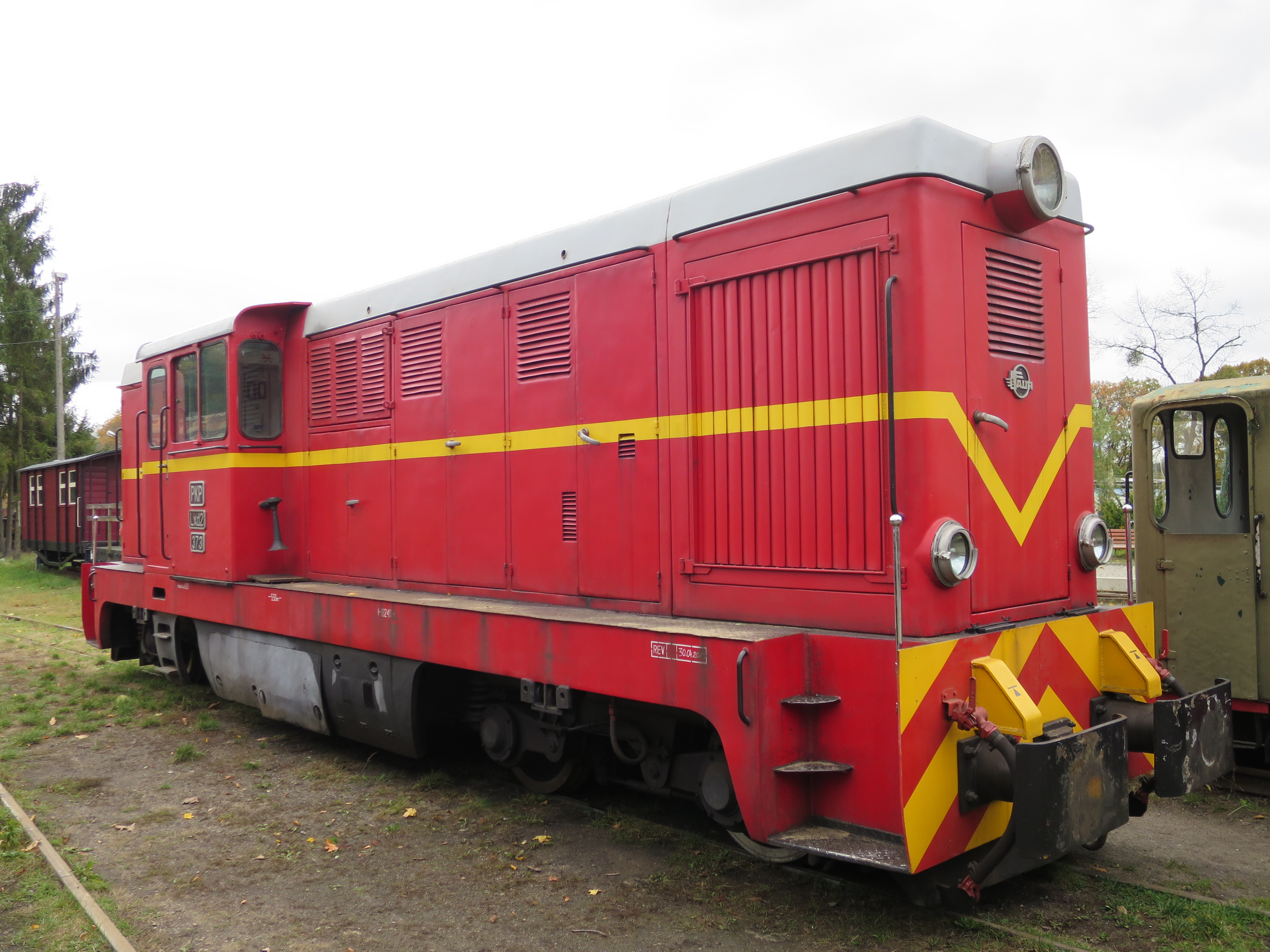
Type and origin
- Power type: Diesel
- Builder: FAUR
- Build date: 1964-1987
- Total produced: 166
Specifications
- Configuration
  - AAR: B-B
  - UIC: B′B′
- Gauge: 750 mm (2 ft 5 1/2 in); 785 mm (2 ft 6 29/32 in); 1,000 mm (3 ft 3 3/8 in)
- Transmission: Voith hydraulic
Career
- Operators: PKP
- Class: Lxd2
- Delivered: 1964

The Lxd2 is a B′B′ narrow gauge diesel-hydraulic locomotive of the Polish state railway Polskie Koleje Państwowe (PKP), produced in Romania by FAUR (former 23 August Works).

Altogether 166 locomotives for 750 mm (2 ft 5 1/2 in), 785 mm (2 ft 6 29/32 in) and 1,000 mm (3 ft 3 3/8 in) gauges were built between 1964–1987. The locomotives are nearly indistinguishable on the exterior, with the only differences being with the engines inside. The first of these locomotives started service in 1968 on the Upper Silesian Narrow Gauge Railways, replacing heavily worn-out Tw47 and Tw53 steam locomotives.

== Usage ==
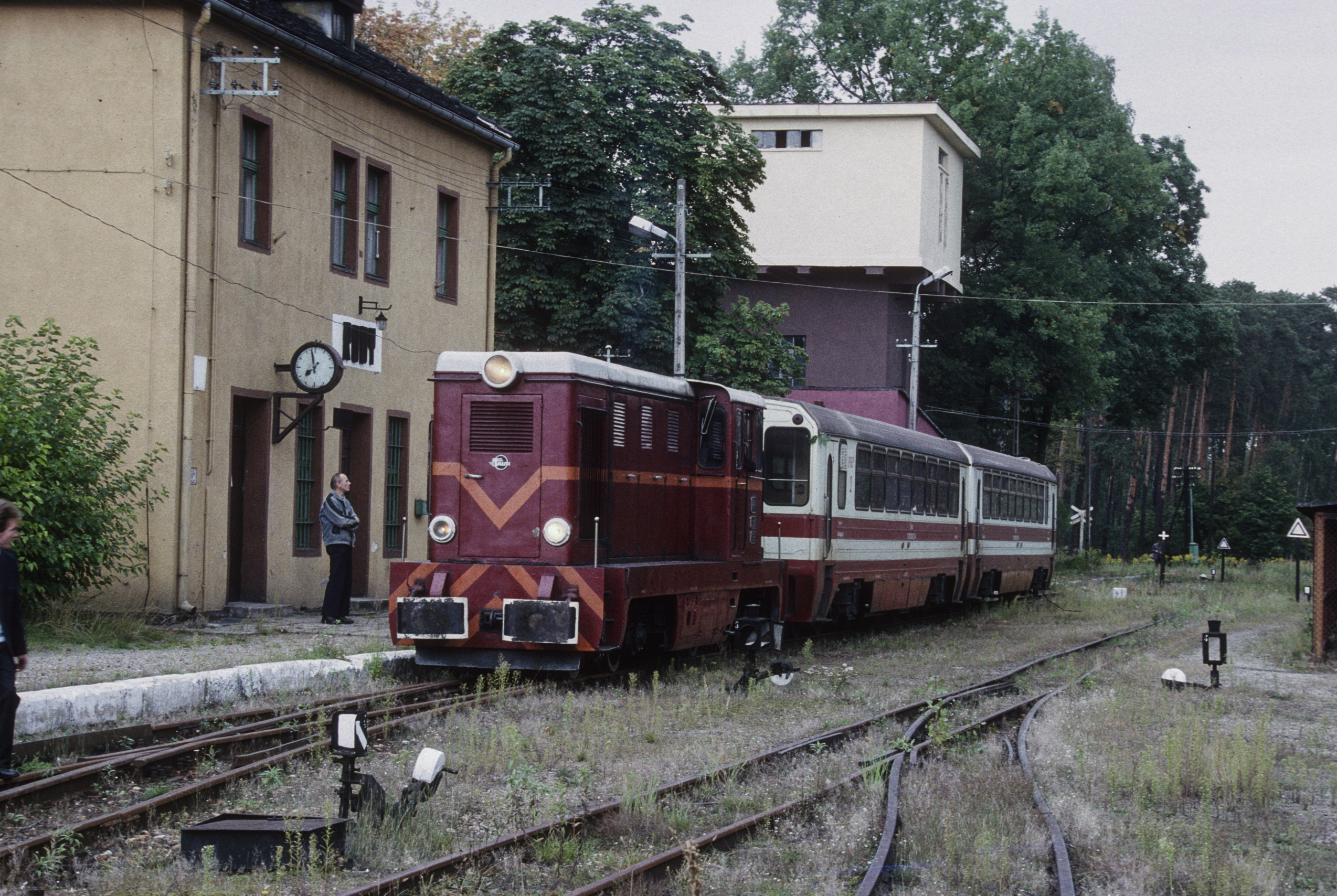
Lxd2 in operation on the Górnośląskie Koleje Wąskotorowe in 1993; seen here at the Rudy station.

PKP purchased a total of 165 Lxd2 locomotives, 111 of which were for the 750mm gauge (inventory numbers from 239 to 349), 25 for 785mm track (numbers 351 to 375) and 29 for 1000mm track (numbers 451 to 479). They were designated as Lxd2, meaning a four axle diesel locomtovie with a diesel engine and hydraulic transmission
