= PKP class SM42 =

Polish diesel locomotive class

SM42
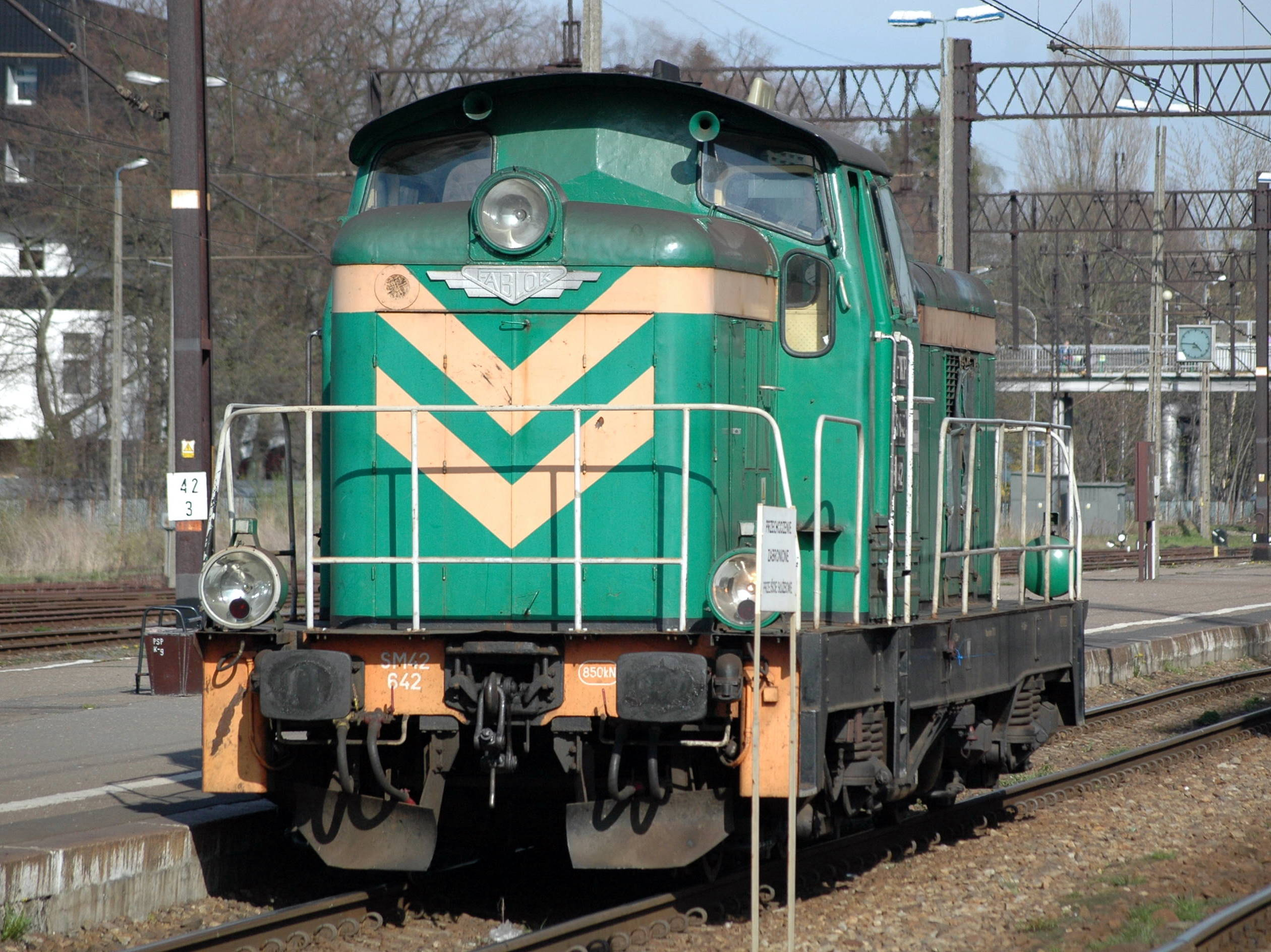
- SM42-642 at Kołobrzeg with the class' typical green with orange stripes livery
Type and origin
- Power type: Diesel-electric
- Builder: Fablok Chrzanów
- Model: Ls800E
- Build date: 1964 - 1992
- Total produced: 1,822
- Rebuilder: Newag; Pesa; ZNTK; Tabor Dębica; H. Cegielski; REMB; PTKiGK Rybnik
- Rebuild date: 1985 - 2025
- Number rebuilt: 294
Specifications
- Configuration
  - AAR: B-B
  - UIC: Bo′Bo′
- Gauge: 1,435 mm (4 ft 8 1/2 in) standard gauge
- Bogies: 1LN
- Wheel diameter: 1,100 mm (43.31 in)
- Wheelbase: 10,100 mm (33 ft 2 in)
- Length: 14,240 mm (46 ft 9 in)
- Width: 3,170 mm (10 ft 5 in)
- Height: 4,285 mm (14 ft 0.7 in)
- Loco weight: 74 t (73 long tons; 82 short tons)
- Fuel type: Diesel
- Fuel capacity: 2,840 L (620 imp gal; 750 US gal)
- Prime mover: a8C22
- Engine type: V8
- Aspiration: turbocharged
- Cylinders: 8
- Cylinder size: 220 mm diameter
- Transmission: Electric
- Train heating: None
- Loco brake: Oerlikon
- Train brakes: Air
- Safety systems: SHP
- Couplers: Screw coupler
Performance figures
- Maximum speed: 90 km/h (56 mph)
- Power output: 800 hp (600 kW)
- Tractive effort: 228 kN (51,300 lbf)
Career
- Operators: PKP >> PKP Cargo; PKP Intercity; Polregio; PKP PLK; PKP Energetyka; Private railway carriers in Poland (Poland); ONCF (Morocco)
- Class: PKP: SM42, Ls800E, Ls800P; ONCF: DG-200
- Nicknames: Stonka; Wibrator
- Locale: Poland, Morocco
- Delivered: 1964
- First run: 1964

SM42 (factory types Ls800E and Ls800P, design type 6D along with subtypes PKP class SM42) is a Polish standard gauge shunter diesel locomotive built for midweight and heavyweight shunting and lightweight local freight traffic, built from 1963 to 1992 by Fablok in Chrzanów also offered to 2013. A total of 1822 locomotives were built, including 1157 for PKP.

SM42 Locomotives are one of the most popular locomotive series throughout Poland (in December 2009, 1224 of them existed including 867 in PKP Cargo livery), in fact these locomotives were the first Polish-designed heavier diesel-electric locomotive.

== History ==
The technical documentation for this locomotive was developed in 1958–1962 by the state Central Construction Bureau of Railway Stock Industry (CBKPTK) in Poznań, as type 6D. The production was given over to the Fablok Locomotive Factory in Chrzanów, where it was designated Ls800E. These diesel locomotives were designed for heavy and midweight shunting as well as lightweight freight traffic along branchlines and short distances on the mainlines. The most important factors were to replace steam locomotives from shunting duties and the ability to form heavy trains for the newly delivered locomotives classified ST43 and ST44 also the electric locomotives ET21. SM42 is the country's first ever diesel locomotives with a bigger amount of power output, thanks to it the dieselisation of Polish railways increased.

The prototype was ready in December 1963. It was lent to the Polish State Railways (PKP), as the SM42-001, the class designation 'SM' meaning a diesel shunter locomotive, and was tested in Warsaw in 1964. Two improved locomotives were built for the PKP in 1964, and twenty in 1965. In 1967, the locomotive entered serial production and 1,822 were built until production ceased in 1992. During the long production run, some minor improvements were incorporated into the design. The locomotives produced from 1972 onwards (so-called batch 2) had simplified chassis (starting from SM42-521, works no. 8499).

Instead of production for the state carrier, between 1969 and 1992 622 locomotives were built for industrial railways. A variant of type 6D locomotive was a type 101D locomotive, equipped with a steam generator for carriage heating. A total of 268 locomotives of this variant were built and classified as SP42. The locomotive was offered in 6Da factory type and 6Da/R modification type until May 2013, when it was announced by a court in Kraków for bankruptcy of the company.

6D locomotives built by Fablok
Factory type	Design type	Build date	Total	Buyer	Country from the buyer
Ls800E	6D	1963 - 1972	1157	PKP	Poland
Ls800E	6Da	1972 - 1992	1157	PKP	Poland
Ls800P	6D	1969 - 1972	622	Industrial railways	Poland
Ls800P	6Da	1972 - 1992	622	Industrial railways	Poland
Ls800/M	6DM	1973 - 1975	37	ONCF	Morocco
—	6Dl	1982	6	Dromex	Iraq

== Design ==
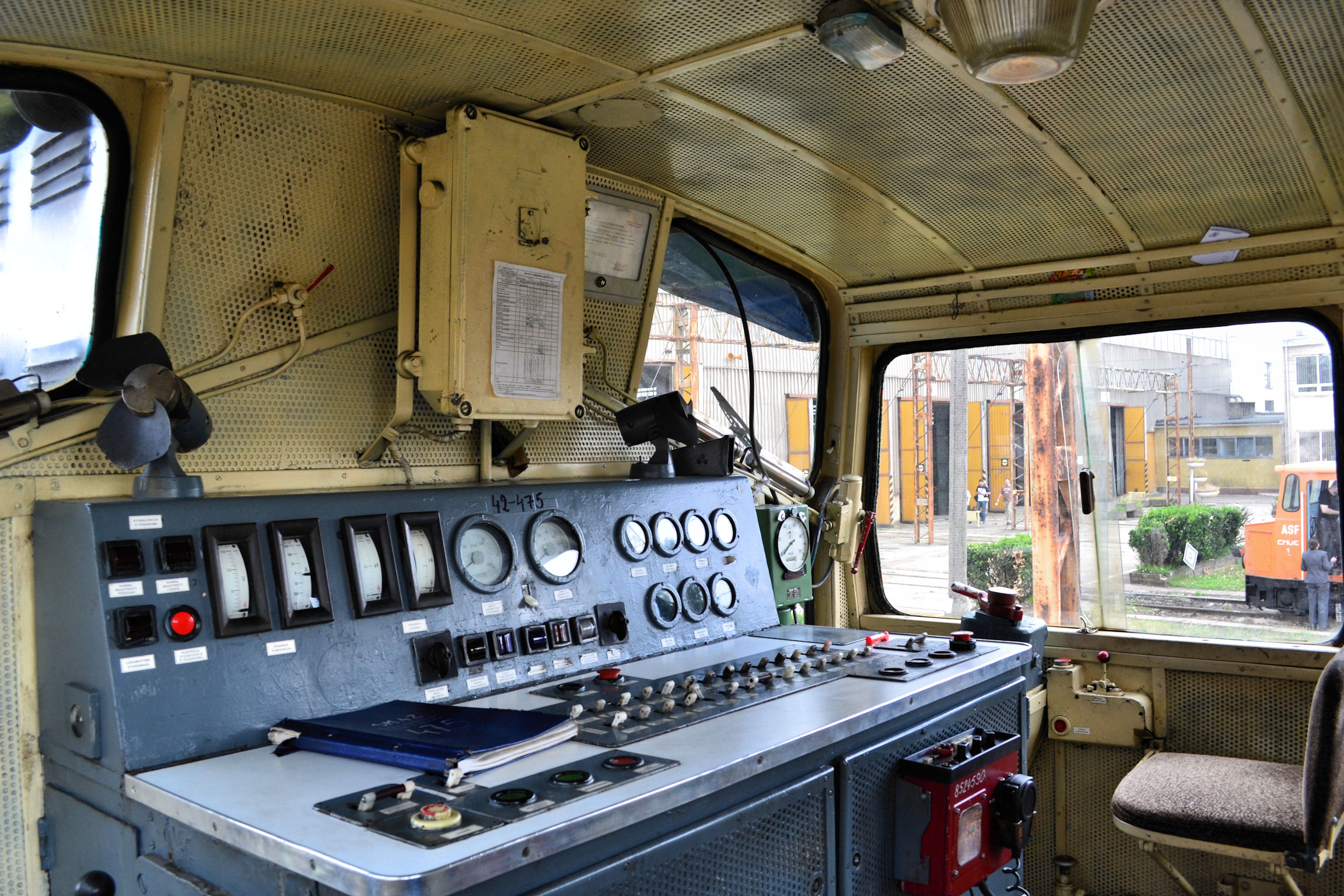
Inside of the SM42 cab

SM42 is a single cab 4-axle locomotive with Bo′Bo′ wheel arrangement, electric transmission and an electropneumatic control equipped with vigilance control (Czuwak aktywny). The locomotive's prime mover is the a8C22 diesel engine with compression ignition with a power of 800 HP (590 kW) and a capacity of 81,6 L built by H. Cegielski in Poznań. The engine has an unusual for a V engine cylinder bank angle of 50 degrees, which was designed to obtain the narrowest possible engine design and the entire engine compartment of the locomotive in order to maintain visibility from the cab. The engine is not balanced enough, causing the locomotive to strongly vibrate while the engine is running, thus having the nickname "Vibrator".

The locomotive has two levels of springing: the bogie frame relative to the axle bogies (wheel set bearings) using leaf springs and rubber pads, and the spring between the locomotive frame and the bogie frame. Locomotive enables in double traction (unless changes has been made to the equipment). Two units can be controlled from a single place.

== Modifications ==
=== EPA42 ===
EPA42
Type and origin
- Power type: Battery electric
- Rebuilder: ZNTK Nowy Sącz
- Rebuild date: 1985
- Number rebuilt: 1
Specifications
- Configuration
  - AAR: B-B
  - UIC: Bo'Bo'
- Gauge: 1435 mm
- Wheel diameter: 1,100 mm
- Wheelbase: 10,100 mm
- Length: 14,240 mm
- Width: 3,170 mm
- Height: 4,285 mm
- Loco brake: Oerlikon
- Train brakes: Air
Performance figures
- Maximum speed: 50 km/h (31 mph)
Career
- Operators: PKP
- First run: 1987
- Retired: 1996
- Scrapped: 2001

Due to the creosote buildup caused by the locomotive exhaust smoke filling the Diameter line tunnel in Warsaw, the concept of making a battery electric locomotive was made at the Central Center for Railway Technology Research and Development (COBiRTK), solution for this was to decrease the amount of smoke filling the tunnel and maintenance costs.

In order not to implement new concepts related to the design, they used a locomotive classified SM42 to convert it into a battery electric locomotive removing the diesel engine and two of four traction motors, also replacing the fuel tank with a rechargeable battery of 320 lead-acid cells with three supply voltage values available, and setting the estimated range to 120 km in 40 km/h. In which they sent the 24th locomotive of the series (SM42-024) to ZNTK Nowy Sącz for a conversion, the maximum speed was set to 50 km/h, green livery repainted into brown livery (the stripes kept their orange color) and it was classified as EPA42-001, meaning the locomotive was rebuilt in 1985 (it was planned to rebuild more locomotives but only one was made).

After the conversion, the locomotive was assigned at MD Warszawa Odolany and sent to COBiRTK twice. In 1987 the locomotive was tested on the Warsaw - Mińsk Mazowiecki route with an experimental train no. 88641 consisting of a single measuring wagon, two or three freight wagons and a standard locomotive SM42 in the back, during tests the locomotive reached between 15 and 20 km/h and stopped at a siding where it stayed for a few hours to let the late express trains pass, the last run was to Siedlice where it left the train for the further test runs. The locomotive took another test run to Stok Lacki station, during the test run one of the locomotive's battery started refusing obedience but still managed to reach the destination reaching 40 km/h, next the locomotive reached to Mordy and came back to Warsaw.

The results were not good as intended, EPA42 proved to be weak for the intended purpose in which the problem was with hauling passenger wagons (SM42 might helped during test runs), the estimated maximum speed was never attained. The rebuild was proven unsuccessful and no further locomotives were rebuilt, the locomotive was retired in October 1996 and then scrapped in 2001.

=== 6Dc ===
In 1996 the design office at ZNTK Piła in cooperation with OBRPS and CBK PKP developed a project modernizing 6D locomotives into 6Dc type using components imported from Germany. ZNTK Piła rebuilt SM42-039 featuring a high speed MTU engine with more power, AC main generator, new depreciated cab, wheel flange lubrication devices, halogen headlights and radio control. The modernized locomotive was classified as SM42-2000, painted in yellow and black livery.

The locomotive was presented at Trako after being modernized, then started its operation in Warsaw, especially at MD Warszawa Odolany. The locomotive started as a yard shunter, then its stationing was moved to Zajączkowo Tczewskie and later to Chojnice, operating regional passenger and freight trains also with shunting duties in some yards. Due to unprofitability of repair of the locomotive, it was retired in 2010 and scrapped the same year in October at Zajączkowo Tczewskie.

=== 6Dd (Ls1000) ===
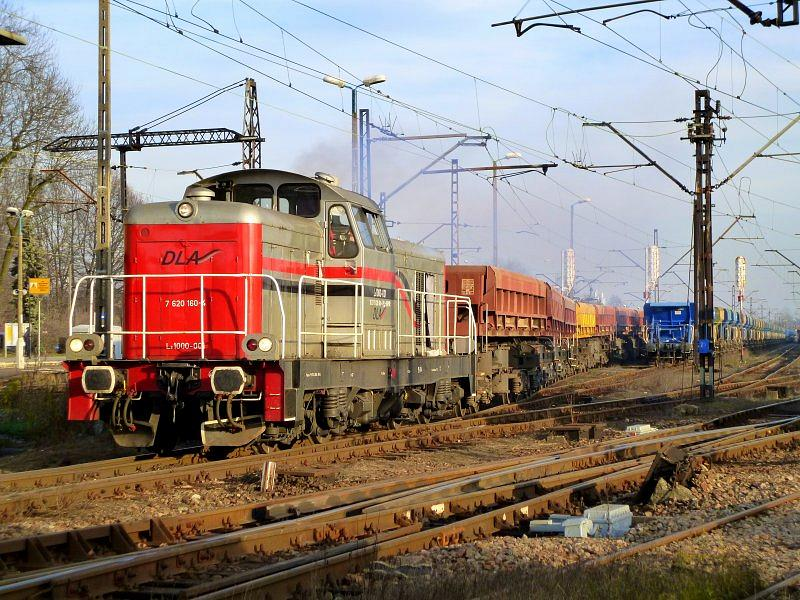
Ls1000-001 as the first locomotive of the series in Krzeszowice

Using the ability to rebuild T448p also S-200 equipped with power generator, PTKiGK Rybnik began to rebuild 6D locomotives into 6Dd type. Between 1997 and 1999 the first locomotive has been rebuilt in its workshop, which was SM42-2536 reclassified as Ls1000-001 with installed imported 1065 HP (783 kW) MTU drive unit, electric machinery made by Dolmel Drivers and an OBRPS compressor unit. The next locomotive rebuilt in 2002 was SM42-2197 reclassified as Ls1000-002, two of them has been rebuilt.

The first locomotive was presented at Trako 2001 in Gdańsk, both locomotives were assigned in Rybnik. In 2008 the locomotives were part of PCC intermodal group, a year later the second locomotive came in part of DB Schenker Rail Polska so as the first one in 2011. The first locomotive was purchased by Dolnośląskie Linie Autobusowe in 2013, and started operation as a maintenance locomotive under the new carrier, in 2014 it obtained a new livery while the second locomotive obtained DB schenker livery and came in part of DB Cargo Polska in 2016. Both locomotives came out of service, the first locomotive is placed in Wrocław along with other locomotives, and the second in Inowrocław.

=== 6De ===
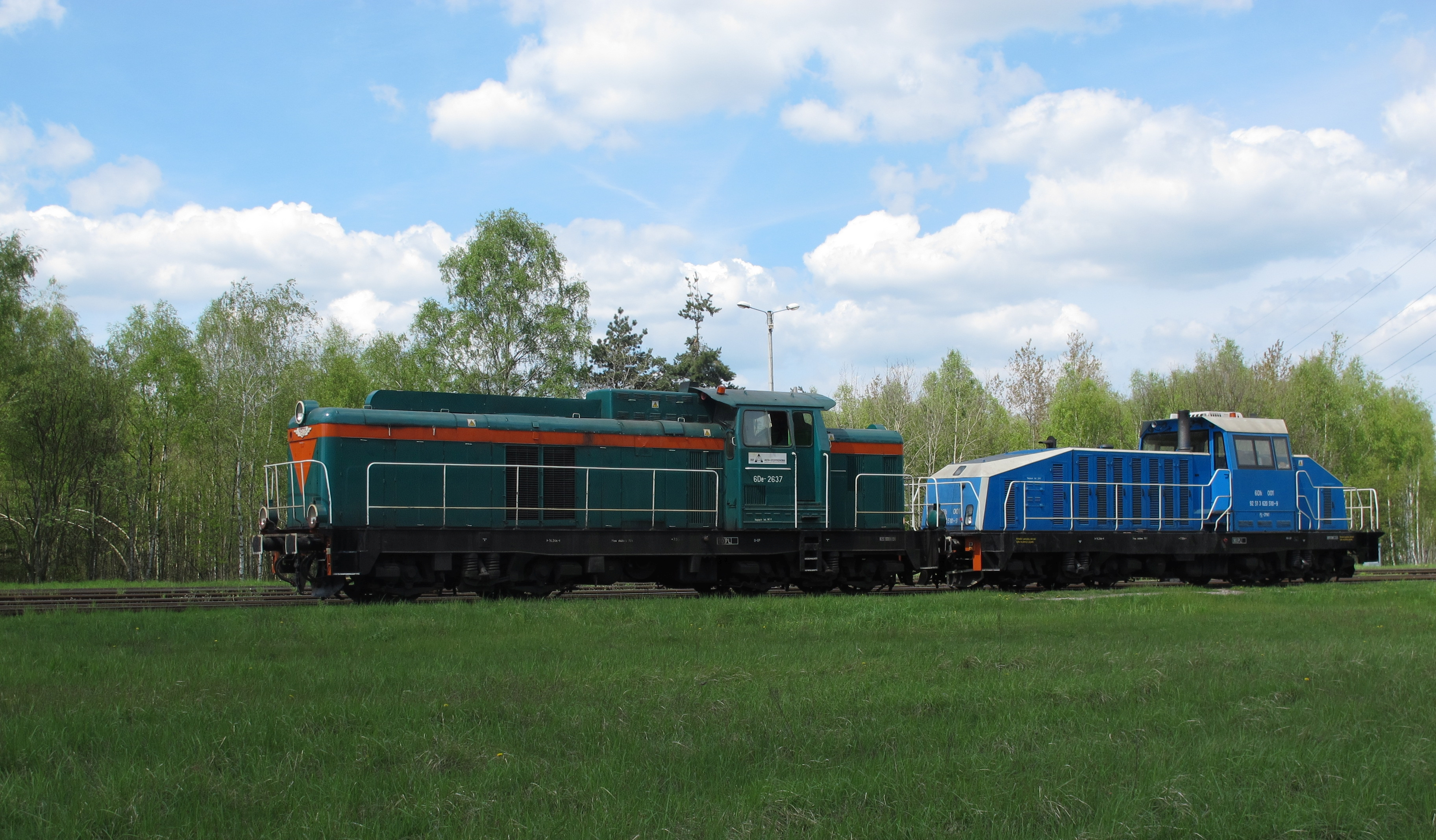
6De as the rebuild for Huta Częstochowa

In the middle of 1990s the Huta Częstochowa initiative developed the first concept of 6D locomotive rebuild into two unit locomotive. The advantage for this solution was the ability to adjust the power for traction purposes to the actual demand, in which the case of a locomotive may vary within very wide limits. Due to the significant cost for the new engine it was decided to replace the generating set with the current engine by installing two generators from the 401Da type locomotive (16H12A engine, LSPb-495 main generator, exciter and auxiliary generator). In addition, an electric fan was used for the suction fan, compressor units with an electric drive, and the location of the traction motor fans was also changed, the chassis, braking system and the cab location were not changed as well. The locomotive's maximum speed limited to 35 km/h results in removal of traction motor bypass system, also the locomotives were adapted for radio remote control. Seven of the locomotives were rebuilt between 1999 and 2002 at Huta Częstochowa and ZNTK Poznań, the locomotives have installed beacons on top of the driver's cab and an orange triangle painted on both ends. One locomotive scrapped in 2017 which was 6De-2621, it was scrapped for unknown reason.

=== Zapychacz UFO ===
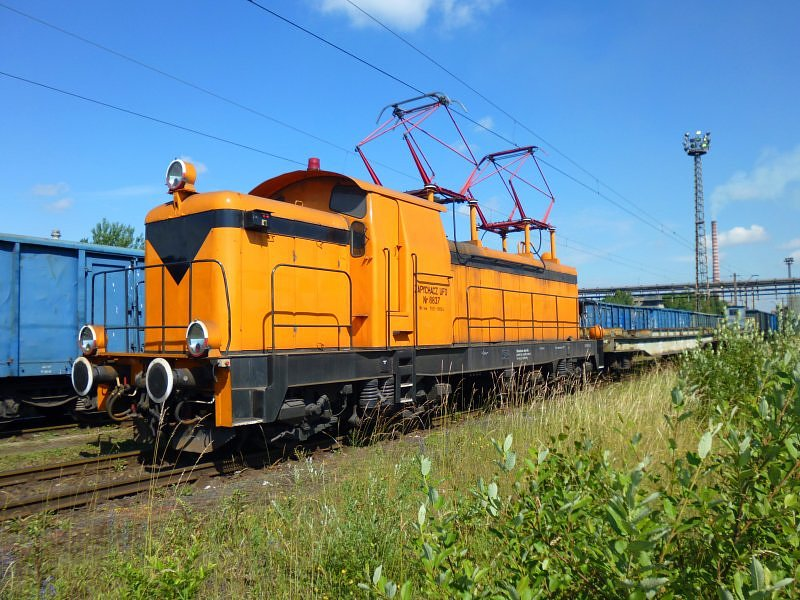
Zapychacz UFO No. A total of 8837 at Katowice Steelworks

An electric variant of the SM42 series was made in 2002 by the REMB company, the reason for it is unknown. The company converted SM42-2243 into a remote control electric locomotive adding two pantographs and removing the driver's cab and other diesel traction components, its livery was repainted to orange with black stripes with a black triangle on both ends, numbered 8837 and named Zapychacz UFO due to the design and its operation. The locomotive is assigned at Huta Katowice to push loaded wagons to the wagon tippler.

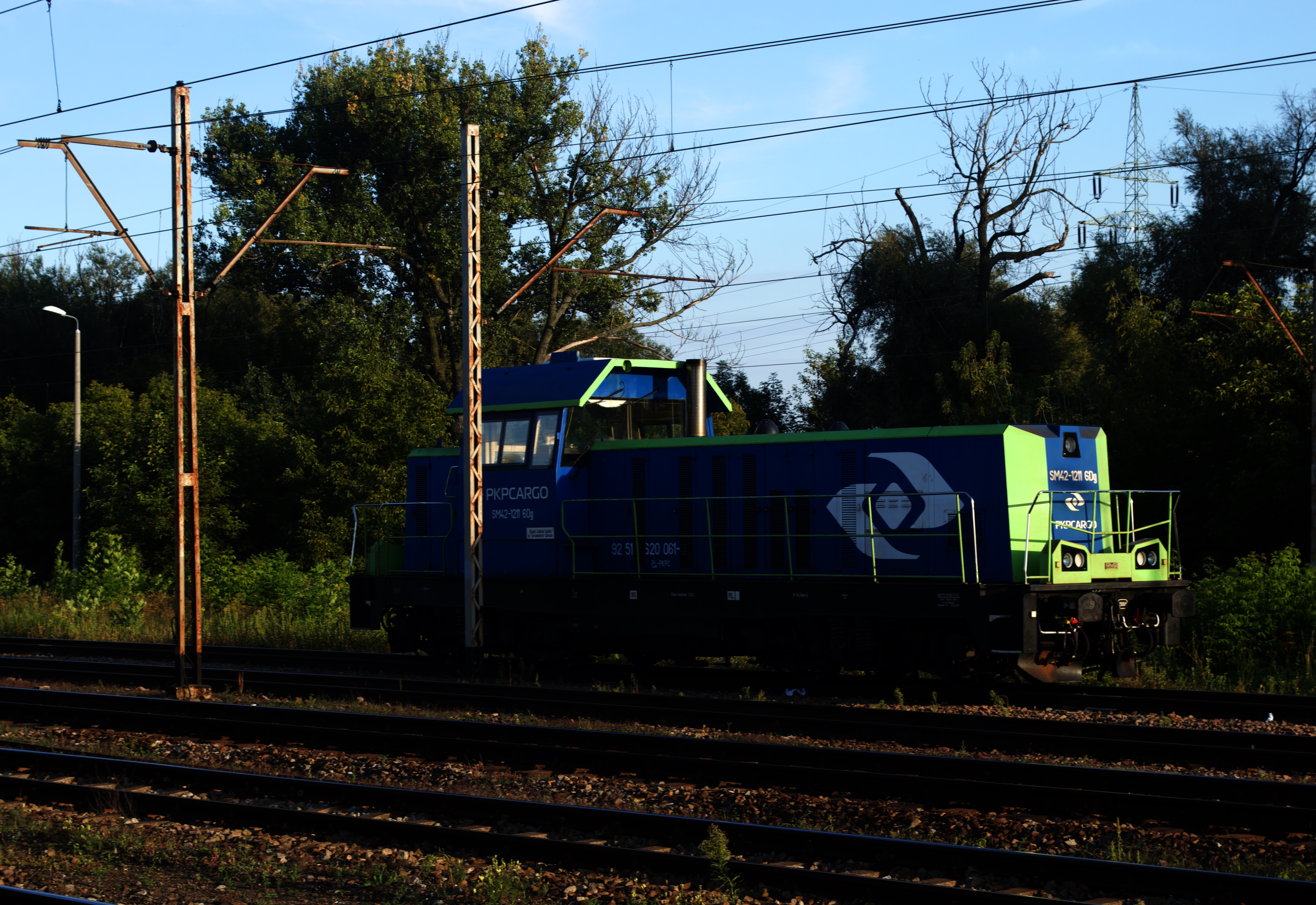
SM42-1211 as Newag's successful rebuild

=== 6Dg ===
From 2007 Newag, in design cooperation with institute of rail vehicles of Kraków's university of technology, carry out comprehensive SM42 locomotive modernizations marked as 6D. From the current SM42 locomotives only chassis and bogies remain, the generator set includes CATERPILLAR C27 diesel engine and ground current main generator also the auxiliary generator, as a result the engine and electrical compartments are lowered. The locomotive gains a new outer shape also an ergonomic cab with larger windshields, having more visibility of the route.

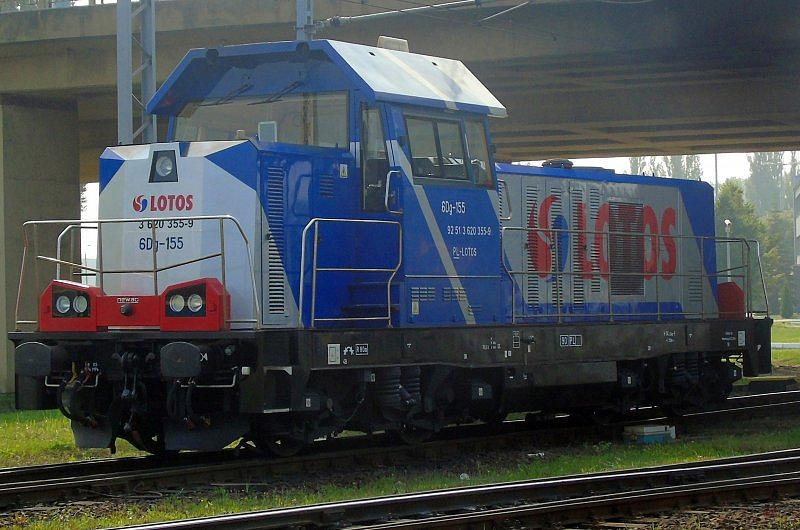
6Dg-155 as a rebuild for its private companies

The first copy was made in 2007 for ISD Huta Częstochowa which was then presented at Trako 2007 in Gdańsk, 2 more examples were made in 2008. A newer version was made in 2009 for PKP Cargo classified as SM42-1501 where it was presented at Trako 2009, after it was presented it came back to Newag to complete the rebuild and reclassified as SM42-1201. After the successful test run PPKP Cargo decided to oder 20 more copies, in which they were delivered between July 2010 and May 2011, Newag won the tender for the modernization of 100 locomotives for PKP Cargo.

A private railway company, PNUIK Kraków sp. z o.o. ordered two copies of 6Dg locomotives as well as KOLTAR owned by Grupa Azoty, four were delivered for both companies in 2011 classified as 6Dg, KOLTAR later decided to order more copies in which the third copy was delivered in 2012. At the end of August, a locomotive built and owned by its own company was made to expand its business to include locomotive rental which was part of the company's new strategy.

Newag still continues to rebuild 6D locomotives into 6Dg type for its private railway companies' orders.

=== 6Dk ===
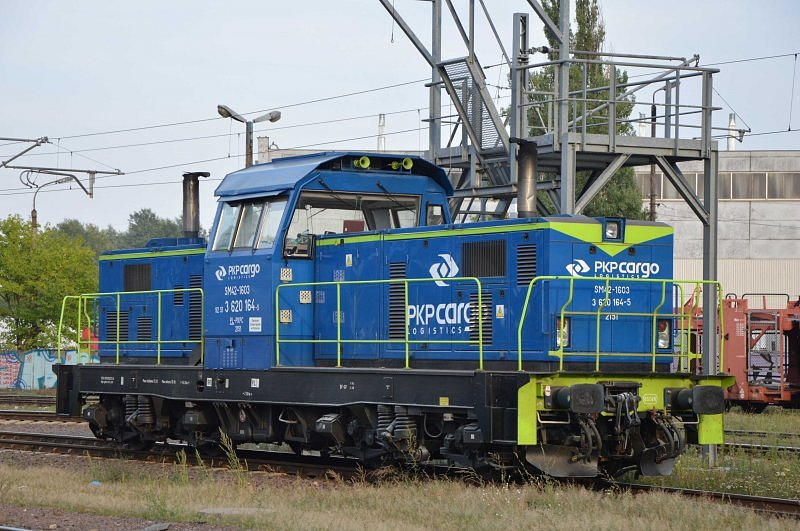
SM42-1603 rebuilt by pesa as a solution to save fuel consumption

Shunter locomotive operations shown that full engine power was used rarely on shunting duties, which causes unnecessary fuel consumption and decreases engine duration, sometimes full power is needed meaning reducing engine power is not necessary. The good solution for this is using two smaller engines with the same or better power output, this solution allows it to use the first, second or both engines at once. It was tested in 1997 during rebuilding a locomotive for Huta Częstochowa, problem was asymmetry and no space for a second engine.

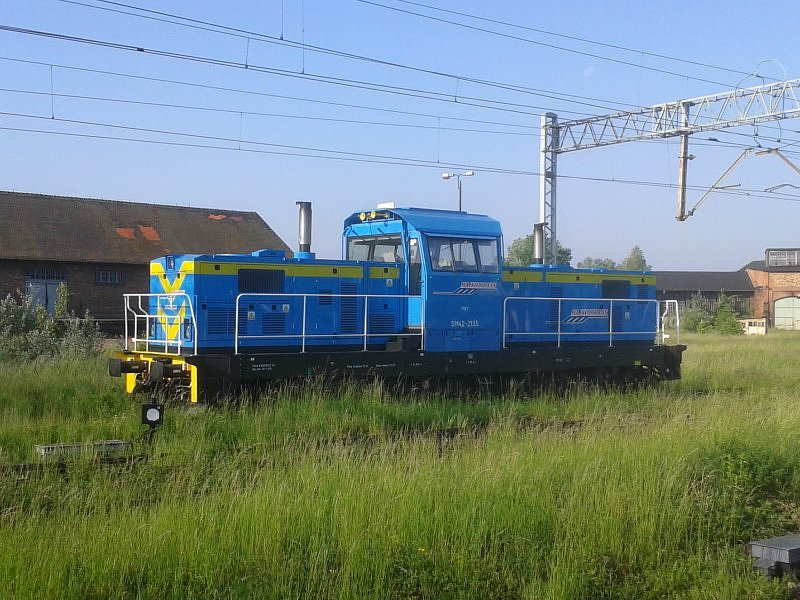
SM42-2135 locomotive rebuild for Majkoltrans

Project was made by Pesa Bydgoszcz, Railway vehicle institute "Tabor" and CZ Loko. From the original locomotive only chassis and bogies remained, which were also rebuilt. Driver's cab was moved to the middle while traction containers with drive units equipped on Caterpillar C15 engines and Siemens traction alternators with converters placed on both ends. The generators can be operated in various combinations, and the locomotive power output was significantly bigger than the original SM42 locomotives - when operating on two generators the locomotive reaches approximately 800 kW. Furthermore, the rebuild allowed for the use of a modular design, which simplifies the locomotive's maintenance.

In September 2009 a prototype example for PKP Cargo marked as SM42-1601 was presented in Trako 2009 in Gdańsk. In the middle of April 2010 it was taken by its railway carrier and began its service. Year later Pesa and PKP Cargo signed a contract of delivering four more examples with a delivery deadline of the end of February 2012. Rebuild examples were marked from 1602 to 1605. In 2012 one rebuilt locomotive was ordered by a private railway company Majkoltrans delivered with its remained classification. Five of the locomotives are out of service expect the one owned by Majkoltrans which was repaired and entered in service.

=== 6Dm ===
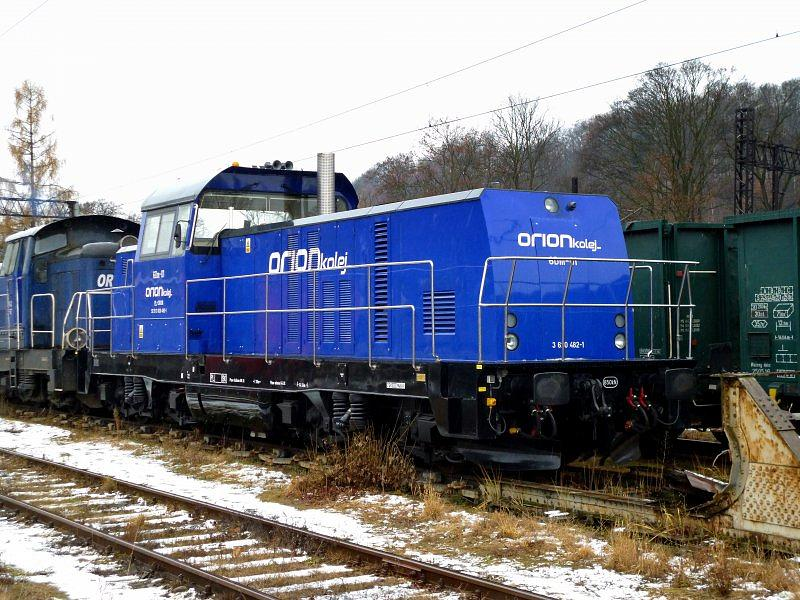
6Dm-01 as the unchosen SP42 rebuild

In 2010, works on modernization SM42 locomotive was made by Orion Kolej. The locomotive featured the similar design with 6Dg locomotive having the same engine and the similar body design. Despite the SM42 modernization, the locomotive used to rebuild was not SM42, it was a passenger variant of the locomotive classified SP42. The locomotive was finished in 2011 and entered service after, it operates freight traffic and maintenance trains as the company is for, the locomotive came in part of LTE Polska in 2020 with its remained Orion Kolej livery. The second example was made in 2025 which was presented at Trako 2025, this time it was rebuilt from an actual locomotive that it supposed to be. Both of them are in service.

=== 18D ===
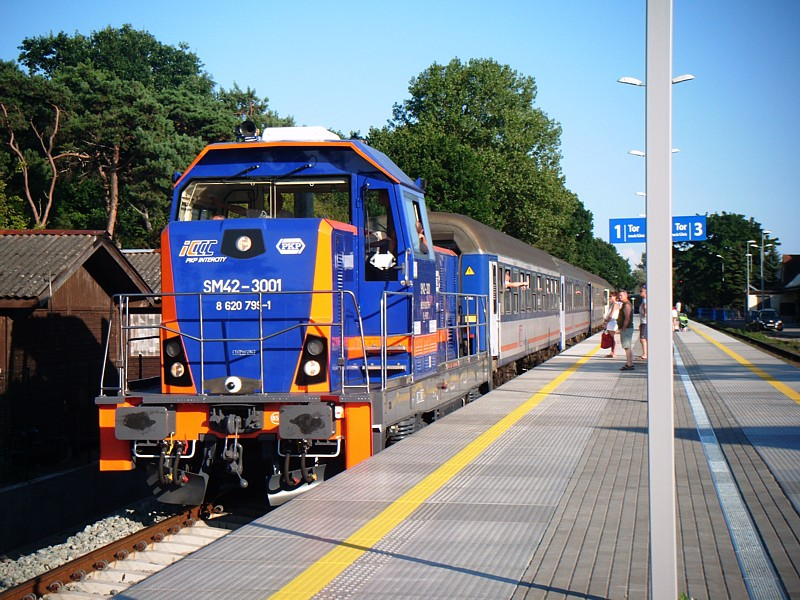
SM42-3001 operating passenger traffic on the Reda - Hel route

In September 2013, PKP Intercity ordered from Newag 10 SM42 rebuilds into single engine locomotives with a battery driving system during Trako 2013 tenders, in which the project started in the end of 2013. The locomotive rebuild is fitted with Caterpillar C18 engine mounted on a common frame connected by a flexible coupling to a set of EMIT synchronous generators A coolant tank and turbocharged air cooler with a fan drive by a belt drive from the combustion engine shaft is mounted in front of the engine, transverse to the locomotive's longitudinal axis also mounted on the sub-engine frame. The engine meets the stage IIIB emission standards (less power but more eco friendly), and the exhaust system is equipped with diesel particulate filter (DOC).

Some tests began on the test track centre near Żmigród, first six locomotives entered service in the start of August 2014, they were assigned in Gdańsk, Kraków and Warsaw (also one in Kołobrzeg), later the next four were delivered. They were classified from 3001 to 3005 and 3101 to 3105. The locomotives operate shunting duties forming intercity trains and bringing them onto the station platforms, they can also operate scheduled intercity passenger trains especially on Reda - Hel line.

=== 6Dl ===
In September 2013, PKP Intercity ordered from Newag 10 SM42 rebuilds into double engine 6Dl type locomotives with an electric heating system during Trako 2013 tenders, in which the project started in the end of 2013. The locomotive has the similar design with 18D locomotive featuring the same engine and the build, its cab was placed in the middle, some 1LN bogies share the same with 6Dg locomotive, in each compartments a power generator and compressor unit are installed powered by diesel engines, and the locomotive is allowed to use the first, second or both engines at once, same as 6Dk.

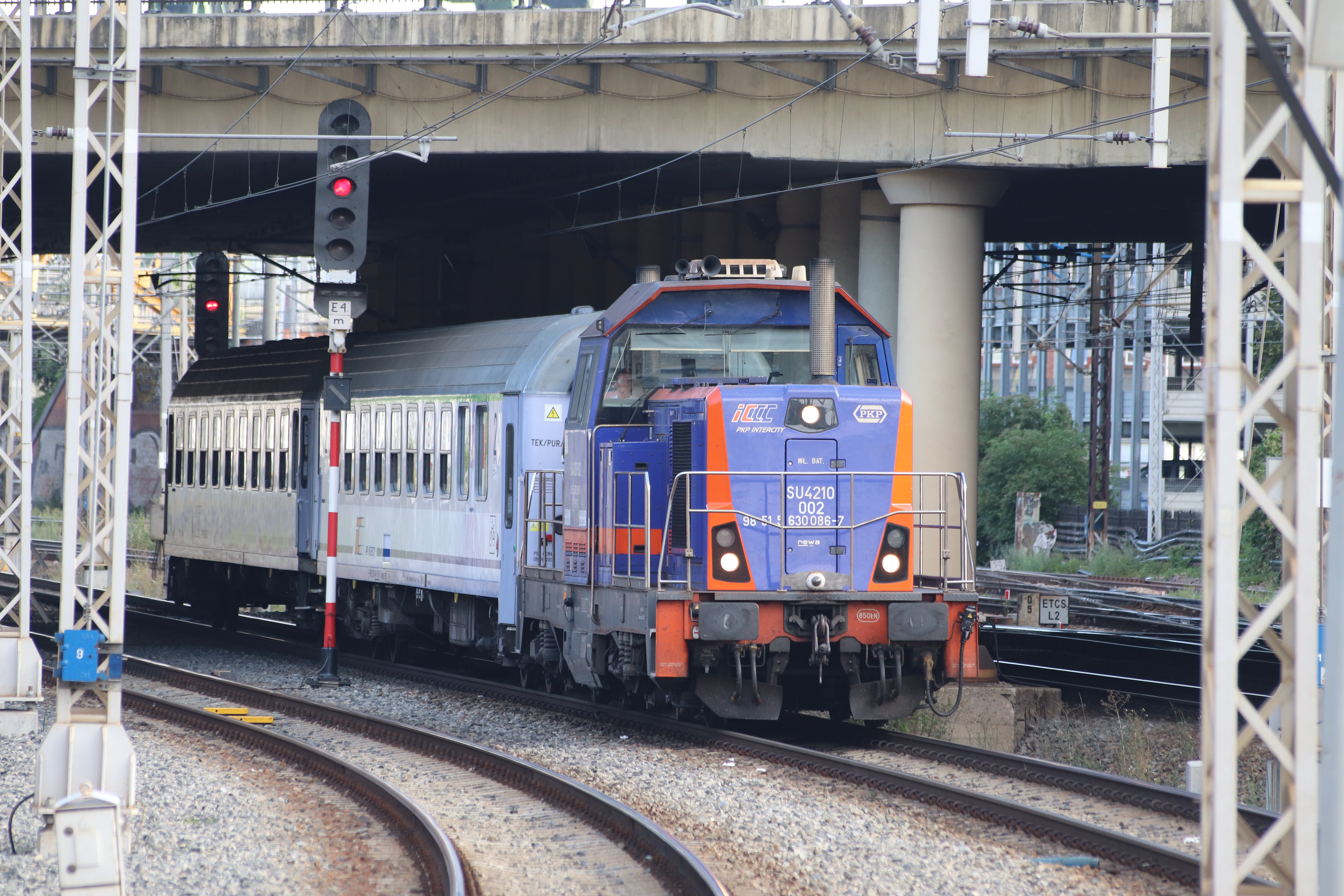
SU4210-002 with the similar design as 18D in Gdańsk

The first locomotive was delivered in 2014 classified as SU42-1001, despite the name there were no SU42 locomotives rebuilt, they are meant to be classified as mixed traffic locomotives to operate scheduled intercity trains and work on passenger shunting duties. Nine more examples were delivered in 2015 which then were classified to SU4210, the locomotives are meant to work on branchlines such as Olsztyn Gutkowo - Braniewo line, Reda - Hel line and Kłodzko Nowe - Kudowa Zdrój line, (some operated as "Sudety" or "Szczeliniec" intercity trains on the Katowice - Legnica line). There were some mechanical problems with the locomotives back in 2020.

=== 6Di ===
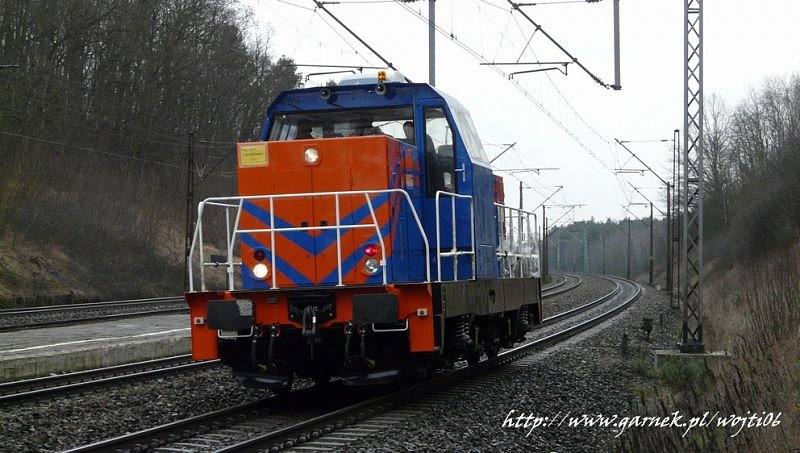
SM42-2126 as the rebuilt that its own company and IPS "Tabor" made this project

In the end of 2008 Fablok and "Tabor" railway vehicle institution received from the National Centre for Research and Development 3,5 million pln in funding for a project titled Modernized type 6D shunter locomotive (SM42 series) with a diesel engine that meets the requirements of the EURO IIIa standard, after that in 2009 both companies started implementing this project. In the same year IPS "Tabor" developed the assumptions for the technical design of the locomotive, which was given the 6Di type, and between 2010 and 2011 the construction documentation for the locomotive was made.

The design involved a modular construction; the bogies and chassis remained, but the underframe was to be reinforced and adapted to accommodate modules containing all the locomotives main systems and components. The Cegielski engine was replaced by a MAN D2842LE622 diesel engine meeting the European emission standards. The generator set, pneumatic panel, compressor unit, driver's cab, external lightning, control, diagnostic and anti-skid systems, radio communication and traffic safety devices as well as electric speedometers and recorders were also to be replaced or modernized. The modular device was to allow for the installation for other devices, including a diesel engine, in accordance with the requirements of potential customers.

Initially the prototype was made by Fablok, but after its bankruptcy in 2013 the project was taken by Pesa. In which with this change the project was slightly modified - it was decided to install a CAT C27 engine and Medcom control system, and additionally a radio control system was installed, and the cabin was equipped with a social equipment (some kitchen appliances). 30 January 2015 Pesa completed modernizing the first example classified SM42-2126, which was part of the ENERGO UTECH S.A. company, then it was sold to Laude Smart intermodal in 2021 where it is still in service today.

=== 6Dh-1 ===
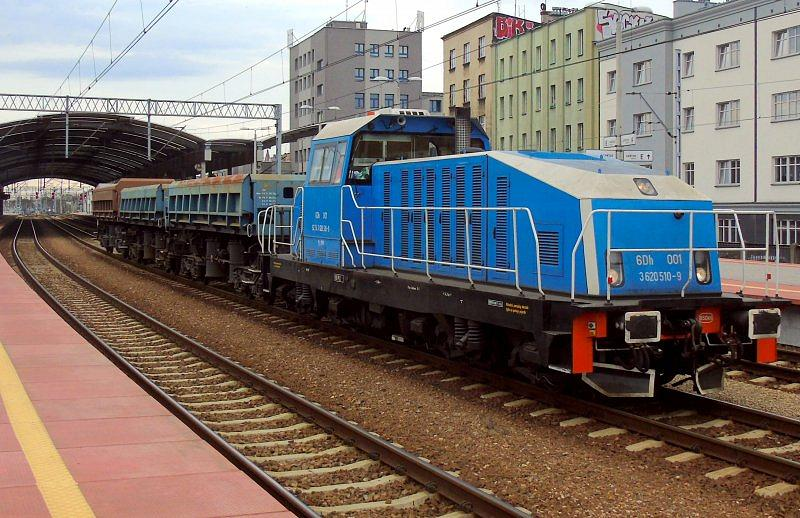
6Dh-1 001 as the private company's SM42 rebuild

In 2008 Tabor Dębica obtained a certificate of approval for a 6Dh-1 type locomotive, similarly to Newag, Tabor Dębica installed a Caterpillar Engine, a new generator and control system, additionally the locomotive is equipped with a video recording system and cruise control. Relative to the 6Dg type, the shape of the body was changed - panoramic windows were installed and the roof of the engine compartment was tilted, which was intended to improve visibility from the cab. The locomotive's trade name was given; it was named Alf.

In the middle of 2016, the first example classified 6Dh-1 001 was tested on the test track centre near Żmigród, then undertook observe runs in Lublin. Tabor Dębica was in a conversation with a potential customer and announced the production of the next examples. On 24 June 2017, during the company's open day the second locomotive classified 6Dh-1 002 intended for Budimex company was presented. A total of 27 locomotives were built, some locomotives operate freight traffic, shunting duties and maintenance trains owned by PKP and private companies, its own company that built these also. The locomotives are in service today.

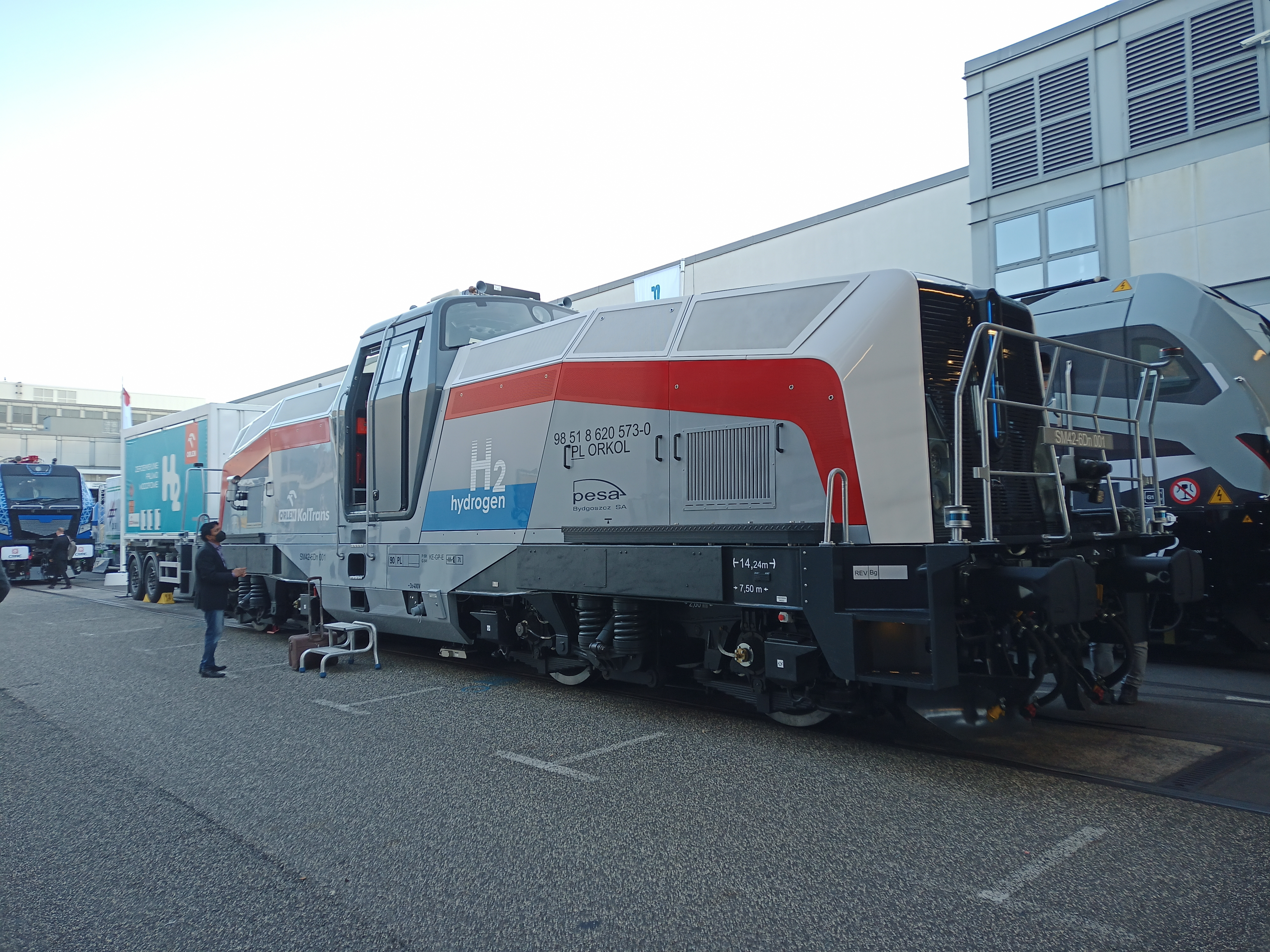
6Dn-001 as Poland's first built hydrogen locomotive

=== 6Dn ===
Works on the project of the hydrogen shunter locomotive by Pesa was started in 2019 based on the SM42 design. The locomotive was rebuilt in 2021, and it was informed that the hydrogen locomotive was ready for industrial applications and logistics support including project related to Orlen Koltrans. The prototype was presented at TRAKO 2021 in Gdańsk. In 2022, some tests occurred in the Pesa manufacturing plant and the test track centre near Żmigród, and in September it was presented at InnoTrans in Berlin. In December the certification tests were completed by the railway institute. In 2023 president of the railway transport office (UTK) issued a certificate of approval for operation for the purpose of the carrying out operational tests for the Poland's first built locomotive powered by hydrogen. In September 2025 Pol-Miedź Trans informed the 4-day tests of the locomotive for the industrial conditions in the KGHM infrastructure.

The locomotive, although not in service yet, had some operations tested including the passenger service. The locomotive once pulled a special train to Karpacz on 3 September 2025 making it the first hydrogen locomtive to Karpacz.

=== 6D-FPS ===
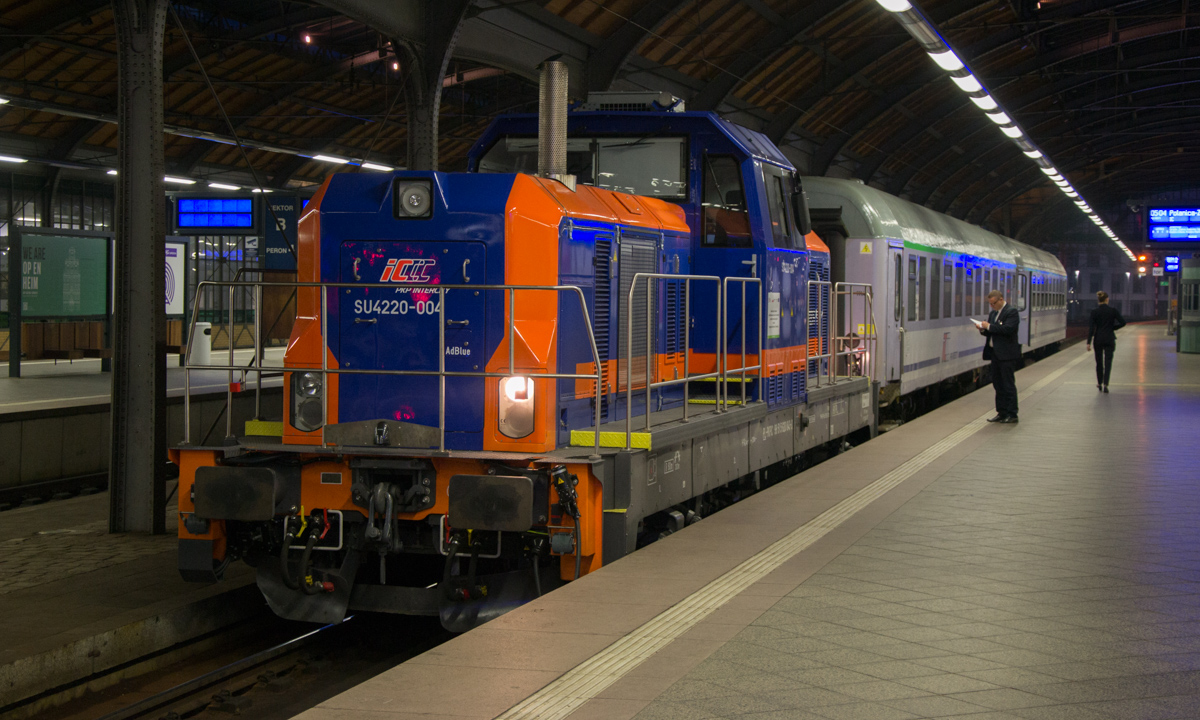
SU4220 as the H. Cegielski's SM42 rebuild

The 6D-FPS locomotives were built in 2021 by H. Cegielski in Poznań for PKP Intercity with a very similar design to 6Dl locomotives. PKP Intercity ordered some locomotives in 2018, which the first two were delivered 19 January 2022, the next two delivered in 30 January, and the remaining delivered in the end of September. The first four locomotives were sent to Southwestern part of Poland to operate intercity trains between Wrocław and Zielona Góra also Wrocław and Polanica.

The locomotive has two generators in each end; the drive allows on one or two generators meaning the power can be adapted to any conditions. The technology used meets stage V standards which means it is more ecofriendly than 6Dl type. The locomotive has less fuel consumption and less exhaust emissions. It has installed ABS system, anti-slip system and crash buffers, it is capable of operating in multiple traction. Advanced on-board diagnostic systems enhance efficiency and operational reliability, automated mode switching provides full control over the locomotive allowing it to be optimally adapted to transport conditions, the locomotive also has a 3 kV DC electric heating system.

The locomotives were built for operating intercity trains on the branchlines and with the passenger shunting duties, also with operating malfunctioned trains. First copy was made in April 2021 classified as SU4220, it was tested on the Poznań - Nowy Tomyśl route and back and it was presented in Trako 2021. Some faulty malfunctions have occurred sometimes, including the locomotive that went up in flames while operating on the route between Wrocław and Zielona Góra that happened on 14 February 2022.

=== List of SM42 locomotives rebuilt ===
Factory type	Design type	Classification	Rebuilder	Rebuild date	Total rebuilt	Notes
—	—	EPA42	ZNTK Nowy Sącz	1985	1	Scrapped in 2001
—	6Dc	SM42-2000	ZNTK Piła	1996	1	Scrapped in 2010
Ls1000	6Dd	—	PTKiGK Rybnik	1999, 2002	2	all out of service
—	6De	—	Huta Częstochowa, ZNTK Poznań	1999 - 2002	7	
—	—	Zapychacz UFO Nr 8837	REMB sp. z o.o.	2002	1	
—	6Dg	SM42-1201 - 1329	Newag	2007 - 2025	212	
—	6Dk	SM42-1601 - 1605	Pesa	2010 - 2012	6	5 out of service
—	6Dm	—	Orion Kolej	2011, 2025	2	
—	18D	SM42-3001 - 3105	Newag	2014	10	
—	6Dl	SU4210	Newag	2014 - 2015	10	
—	6Di	SM42-2126	Pesa	2015	1	
—	6Dh-1	—	Tabor Dębica	2016 - 2025	27	
—	6Dn	—	Pesa	2021	1	Prototype
—	6D-FPS	SU4220	H. Cegielski	2021	13	

== Accidents and incidents ==
- On 1 August 2013, in Tczew near the Rokicka street SM42-2431 crashed head on collision with EU07-206 with a freight train, leaving two drivers injured. Both locomotives that crashed are in service today.

== Current operators ==
This is a list of current operators of the SM42 locomotive, including the rebuilt locomotives. The following symbols mean the type of SM42 locomotive, and the following list shows all the private companies operating these locomotives

(*) 6D, (•) 6Dg, (') 6Dh-1, (^) 6Dk, (") 6Dm, (>) 6Di, (<) 18D/6Dl/6D-FPS, (°) Ls1000

=== PKP owned ===
- PKP Cargo (* • ^)
- PKP Cargo service (* •)
- PKP Energetyka (*)
- PKP PLK (')
- PKP Intercity (* <)
- Polregio (*)

=== Private companies ===
- Alusta (*)
- Alza Cargo (* ')
- Bartex (*)
- Budimex (')
- Captrain (*)
- Cargomaster (*)
- Cargo Przewozy Towarowe Transport (*)
- Cemet (*)
- Ciech Cargo (*)
- CTL Logistics (*)
- Dolnośląskie Linie Autobusowe (*)
- Ecco Rail (*)
- Grupa Azoty (* •)
- Grupa ZUE (* ')
- IGL (*)
- Jaxan (*)
- JSW Logistics (* ')
- Karpiel (*)
- Kolej Bałtycka (*)
- Kolprem (* •)
- Koltar (* •)
- Laude Smart Intermodal (>)
- Lhoist (*)
- Logistics & Transport Company (*)
- Majkoltrans (* • ^ ')
- Metrans (*)
- Mondi Świecie (*)
- Moris (*)
- Newag Nowy Sącz (* •)
- Omniloko (*)
- Orion Kolej (*)
- ORLEN KOLEJ (* •)
- PCC Intermodal (* ')
- PESA Bydgoszcz (*)
- PERN S.A. (*)
- PGE GiEK (* • ')
- PHU Lokomotiv (*)
- PNUIK Kraków (• ')
- Pol-Miedź Trans (•)
- Poltrans (*)
- PPM-T (* ')
- Protor (*)
- PUK Kolprem (* •)
- Rail Polonia (•)
- Rail Polska (*)
- SERVICE AND LOGISTICS GROUP (*)
- Silva (*)
- Swietelsky (*)
- SKPL Cargo (*)
- Strabag (*)
- Tabor Dębica (* ')
- Techservice (*)
- TKP Silesia (*)
- TORPOL (* ')
- Trainspeed (*)
- Trakcja PRKiI (* •)
- Wiskol (*)
- ZIK Sandomierz (*)

== Nicknames ==
This locomotive has also been referred to by the following nicknames:

- Stonka (Colorado beetle) – from the original livery
- Wibrator (Vibrator) – from the vibrations the engine produced
- Eleska – from the factory designation: Ls800
- Fablok – from the producer

== See also ==
- List of rolling stock used in Poland
