= CZ Loko =

Czech railway locomotive services provider

CZ LOKO, a.s.
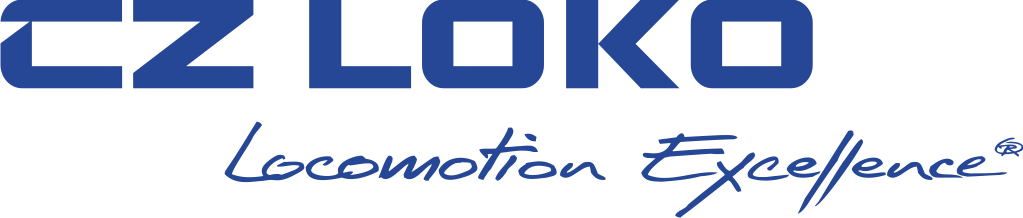

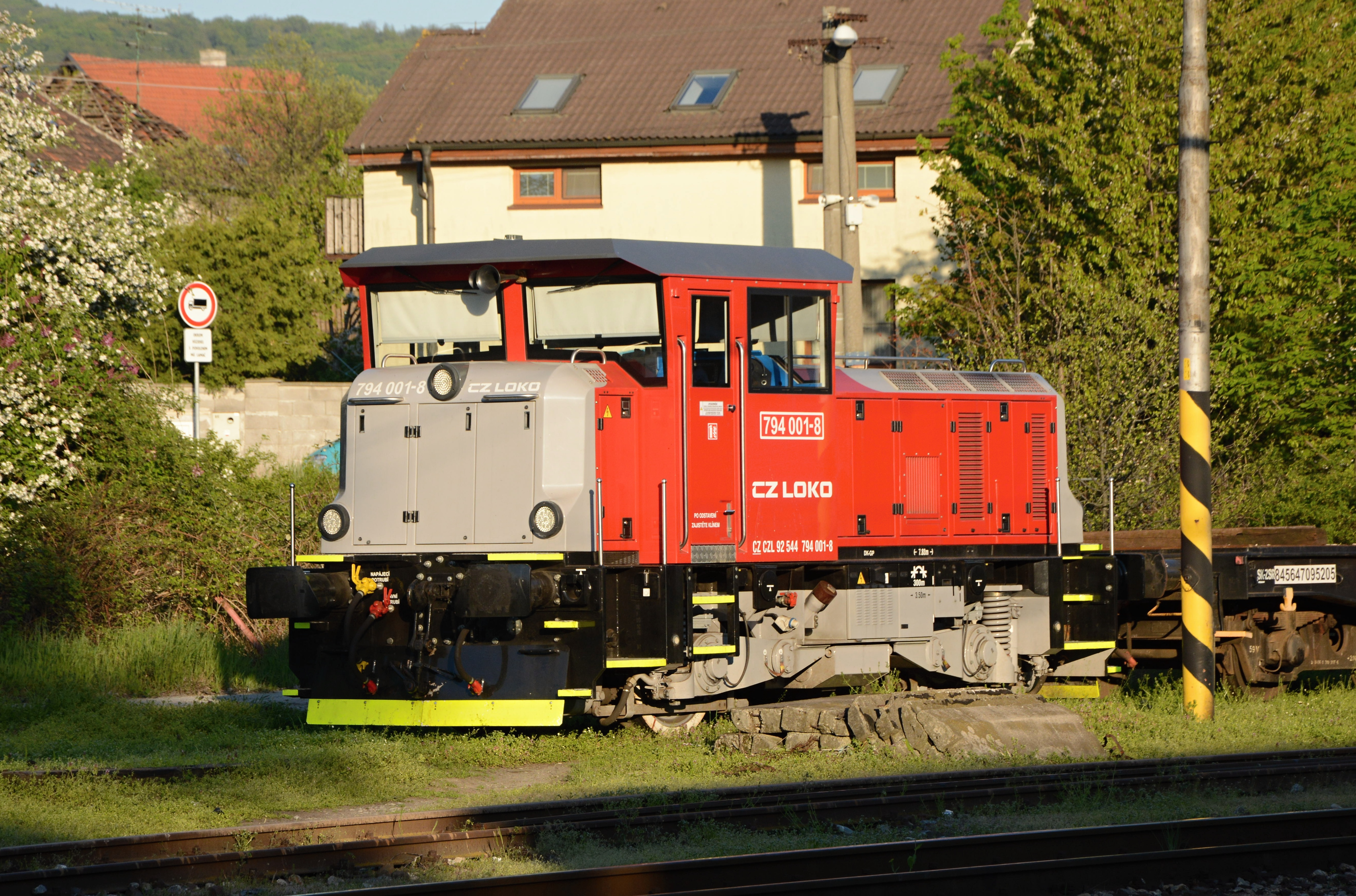
- Locomotive 794 001 in Bratislava, 2016
- Type: Joint-stock company
- ISIN: CZ0005129775
- Industry: Rolling stock manufacturing
- Founded: 3 January 1995; 31 years ago in Nymburk
- Headquarters: Česká Třebová, Czech Republic
- Products: Locomotives and track-maintenance vehicles
- Revenue: CZK 3.709 billion (2025–26)
- Operating income: 104,192,000 Czech koruna (2018)
- Net income: CZK 88 million (2025–26)
- Total assets: 2,053,854,000 Czech koruna (2018)
- Number of employees: ~500 (2026)
- Website: www.czloko.cz

CZ Loko is a Czech locomotive and railway vehicle repair, modernisation, and manufacturing company, based in Česká Třebová.

== History ==
The company was founded as Českomoravská komerční společnost, in 1995, based in Nymburk. In 1999, the company was renamed ČMKS holding, as.. In 2006, the company moved to Česká Třebová, and was renamed CZ Loko.

== Products ==
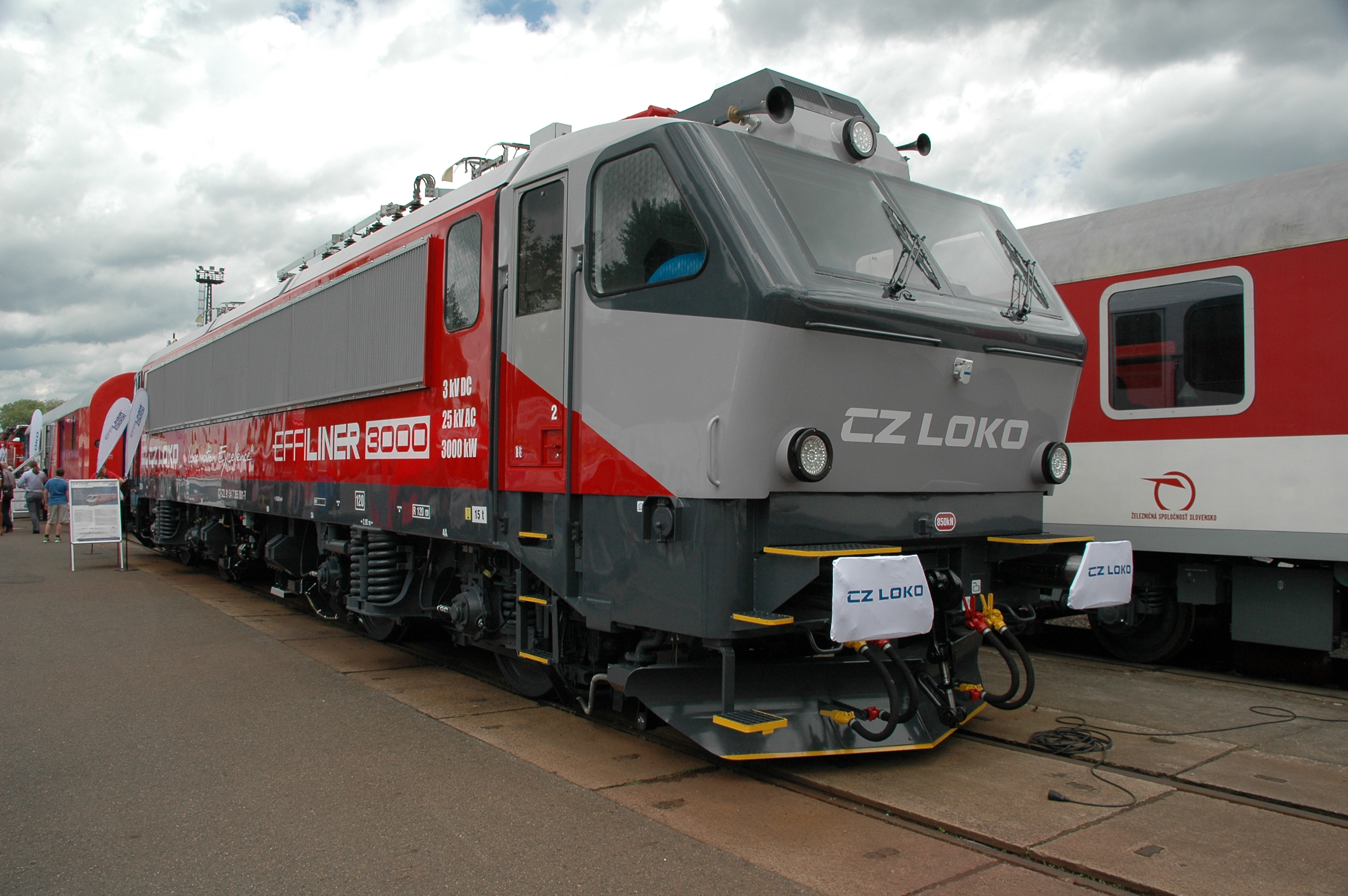
EffiLiner 3000 locomotive

CZ Loko manufacturers several types of diesel shunting locomotives, as well as full sized diesel and electric locomotives.

=== HybridShunter 400 ===
The HybridShunter 400 is a battery-electric shunting locomotive, first produced in 2019. A two axle locomotive, mainly powered by batteries, which have an estimated life of 24 to 48 hours. The Loco is also fitted with a 44KW Caterpillar to be used as a backup.

=== EFIShunter Range ===
The EFFIShunter range are CZ Loko's diesel shunting locomotives. The 300 is the smallest locomotive on offer, with the 600, 1000, and 1600 offering higher levels of power, giving 563KW, 895KW, and 1550KW respectively. There is also the C30-M available, a heavy duty version of the 1600 built for 1520mm gauge.

== Other services ==
The company is also known for its modernisation of locomotives, such as former ČD Brejlovec locomotives, ČD Class 750 and ČD Class 753, which have been refurbished for Czech, Italian, Slovak, and Hungarian operators. The company has also modernised other former ČD locomotives, such as the ČD Class 740 and ČD Class 742.
