= PCC-Stadion =

Football stadium in Homberg (Duisburg), North Rhine-Westphalia, Germany

Coordinates: 51.462°N 6.701°E

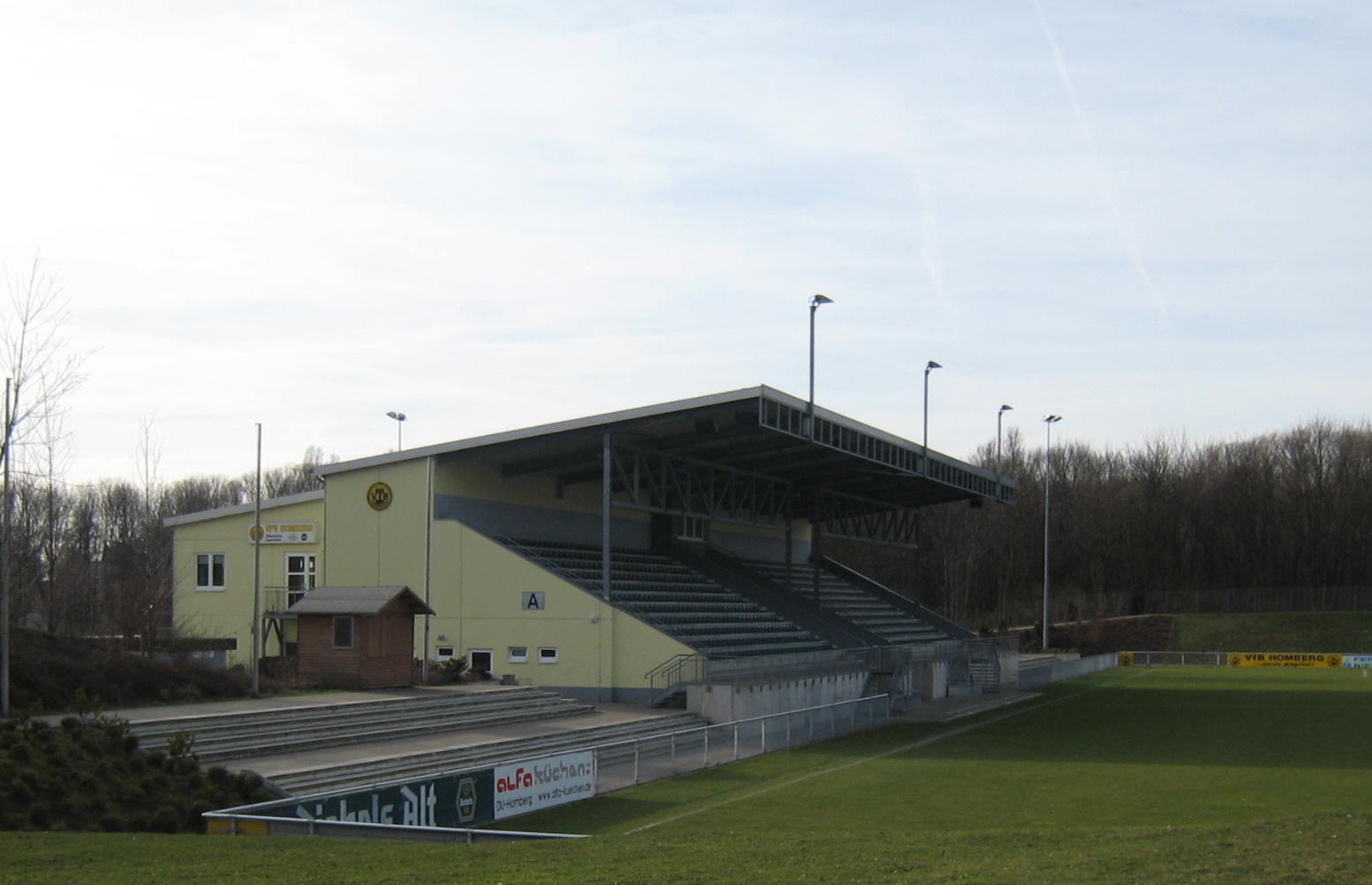
PCC-Stadion

The PCC-Stadion is a football stadium in Homberg (Duisburg), North Rhine-Westphalia, Germany. It is the home ground of the women's Bundesliga side MSV Duisburg—continuing the tradition of the FCR 2001 Duisburg—and men's fourth division side VfB Homberg.

The stadium has a capacity of 3,000. The main stand has 800 covered seats. The name of the ground comes from PCC SE, a local industrial company and sponsor of the stadium since its construction in 2003.
