= DB Schenker Rail Rybnik =

Polish rail company operating mainly in freight transport

DB Schenker Rail Rybnik S.A.
- Company type: JSC
- Industry: Rail transport
- Founded: 1965
- Defunct: 2011
- Headquarters: Rybnik, Poland
- Key people: Adam Czernik; CEO
- Revenue: ▲238.300.000 zł (2004)
- Net income: ▲23.300.000 zł (2004)
- Number of employees: 1119
- Website: www.ptkigk.com.pl

DB Schenker Rail Rybnik S.A., till 2009 PCC RAIL RYBNIK S.A., formerly Przedsiębiorstwo Transportu Kolejowego i Gospodarki Kamieniem w Rybniku, PTKiGK Rybnik (Rail Transport and Stone Management Company in Rybnik), was a Polish rail company operating mainly in freight transport.
The company owned 110 locomotives and 1577 freight cars. In 2005, it transported over 52,700,000 tons of cargo. Locomotives were painted red and light yellow (the PTKiGK livery), but the colours were to be changed to the blue-orange PCC Rail livery.

== History ==
PTKiGK Rybnik emerged from the company ZTKiGK, that started operation in 1965, taking care of mainly stone transport.
In 1994, the company was privatised and went public under the name PTKiGK.
In 2007, the main part of shares was taken over by the PCC Rail group; on 8 October 2008, the name was changed to the PCC Rail Rybnik.

=== Acquisition by Deutsche Bahn ===
On 30 January 2009, PCC's president Waldemar Preussner sold PCC Rail S.A. to Deutsche Bahn, the German national railway company. PCC Rail is slated to become a part of DB Schenker Rail's Eastern European operations. After the transaction was finalized, the name of the company was changed to DB Schenker Rail Rybnik S.A.

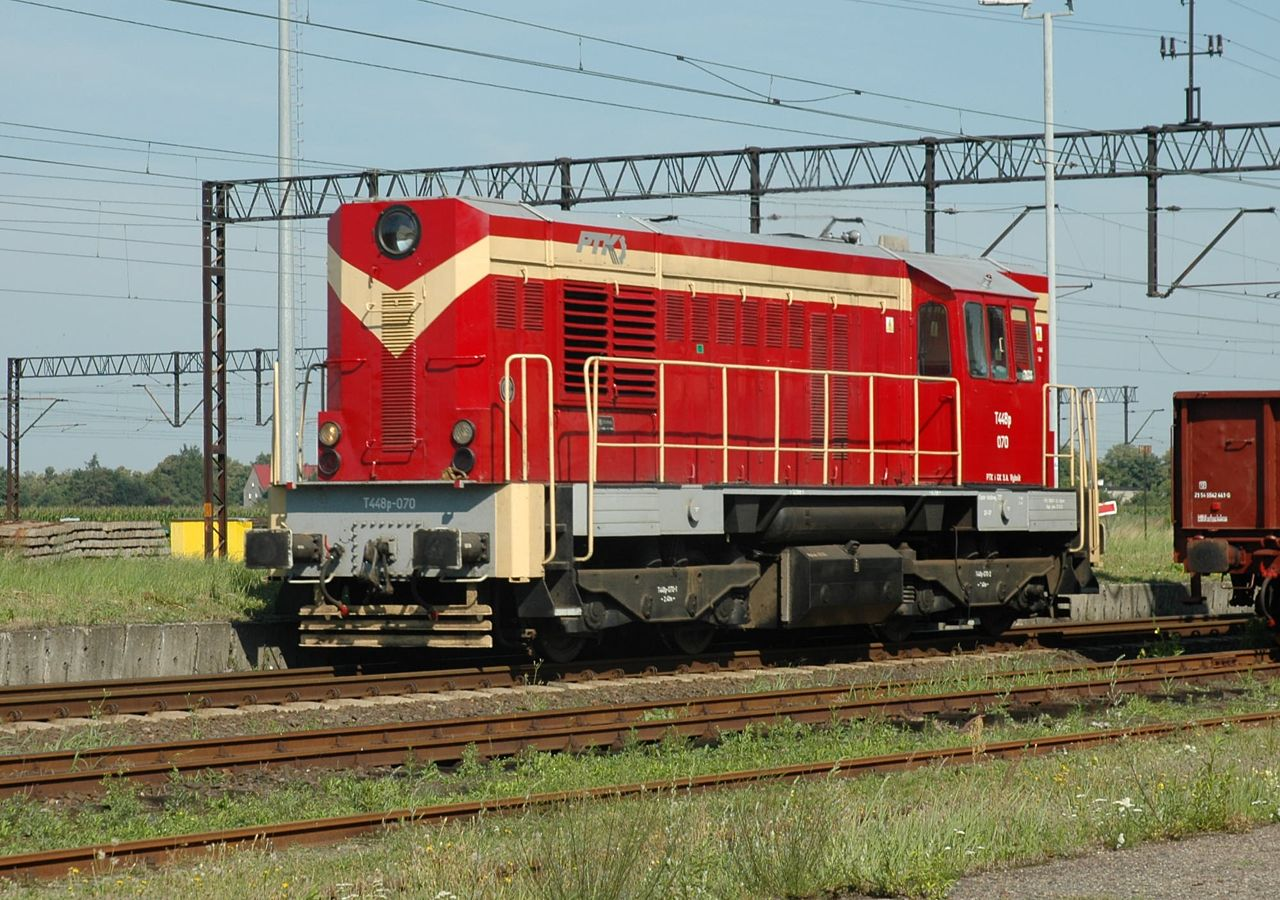
Locomotive of the class T448P in PTKiGK livery

== See also ==
- Transportation in Poland
- List of railway companies
- Polish locomotives designation
