= PKP class SP42 =

Polish diesel locomotive class

SP42
- SP42-057 at Laskowice Pomorskie railway station in 1995
Type and origin
- Power type: Diesel-electric
- Builder: Fablok
- Model: Ls800
- Build date: 1967–1978
- Total produced: 268
- Rebuilder: ZNTK Nowy Sącz
- Rebuild date: 1999–2000
- Number rebuilt: 40
Specifications
- Configuration
  - UIC: Bo′Bo′
- Gauge: 1,435 mm (4 ft 8 1/2 in)
- Wheel diameter: 1,100 mm (43.31 in)
- Length: 14,240 mm (46 ft 9 in)
- Width: 3,170 mm (10 ft 5 in)
- Loco weight: 74 tonnes (163,100 lb)
- Fuel capacity: 2,840 L (620 imp gal; 750 US gal)
- Prime mover: a8C22
- Cylinders: 8
- Transmission: Electric
- Loco brake: Oerlikon
Performance figures
- Maximum speed: 90 km/h (56 mph)
- Tractive effort: 228 kN (51,260 lbf)
Career
- Operators: PKP
- Class: SP42
- Nicknames: Zebra; Wibrator
- Disposition: 40 converted to SU42, 3 preserved, remainder scrapped

SP42 (factory type Ls800, design type 101D) is a Polish class of passenger diesel electric locomotives, built by Fablok in Chrzanów between 1967 and 1978. The locomotive is a modification of the SM42 class locomotive, equipped with an integrated steam boiler for heating passenger train carriages. A total of 268 units of the class were manufactured and delivered to Polish State Railways (PKP).

== History ==
The SP42 is in fact the same locomotive as SM42, but modified for passenger transport. The modification was carried out by adding a heating system for passenger cars on the locomotive. Withdrawal of this class started in '90s, some of them was rebuilt into SU42 class (electrical heating instead of steam). SP42 class were totally withdrawn from PKP's service in year 2008. The last one (number 007 from depot Skarżysko Kamienna) made its special run with Bhp class double deckers from Skarżysko to Tomaszów Mazowiecki.

== Preservation ==
A total of 3 locomotives have been preserved, this includes 1 operational, 1 out of order and 1 stored.

Fleet number	Image	Owner	Location	Condition
SP42-001		KSK Wrocław	Wrocław	Operational
SP42-114		Muzeum Parowozownia Jarocin	Jarocin	Out of order
SP42-260		PKP Cargo	Chabówka	Stored

== Nicknames ==
This loco used to be called the following names:

- Łajka
- Kociołek (eng. boiler) - because of the steam heating system
- Zebra - from the painting
- Wibrator (eng. Vibrator) - from vibrations produced by the engine
- Eleska - from the factory number: Ls800
- Fablok - from the name of the producer

== See also ==
- Polish locomotives designation
