= PKP class SU42 =

PKP SU42
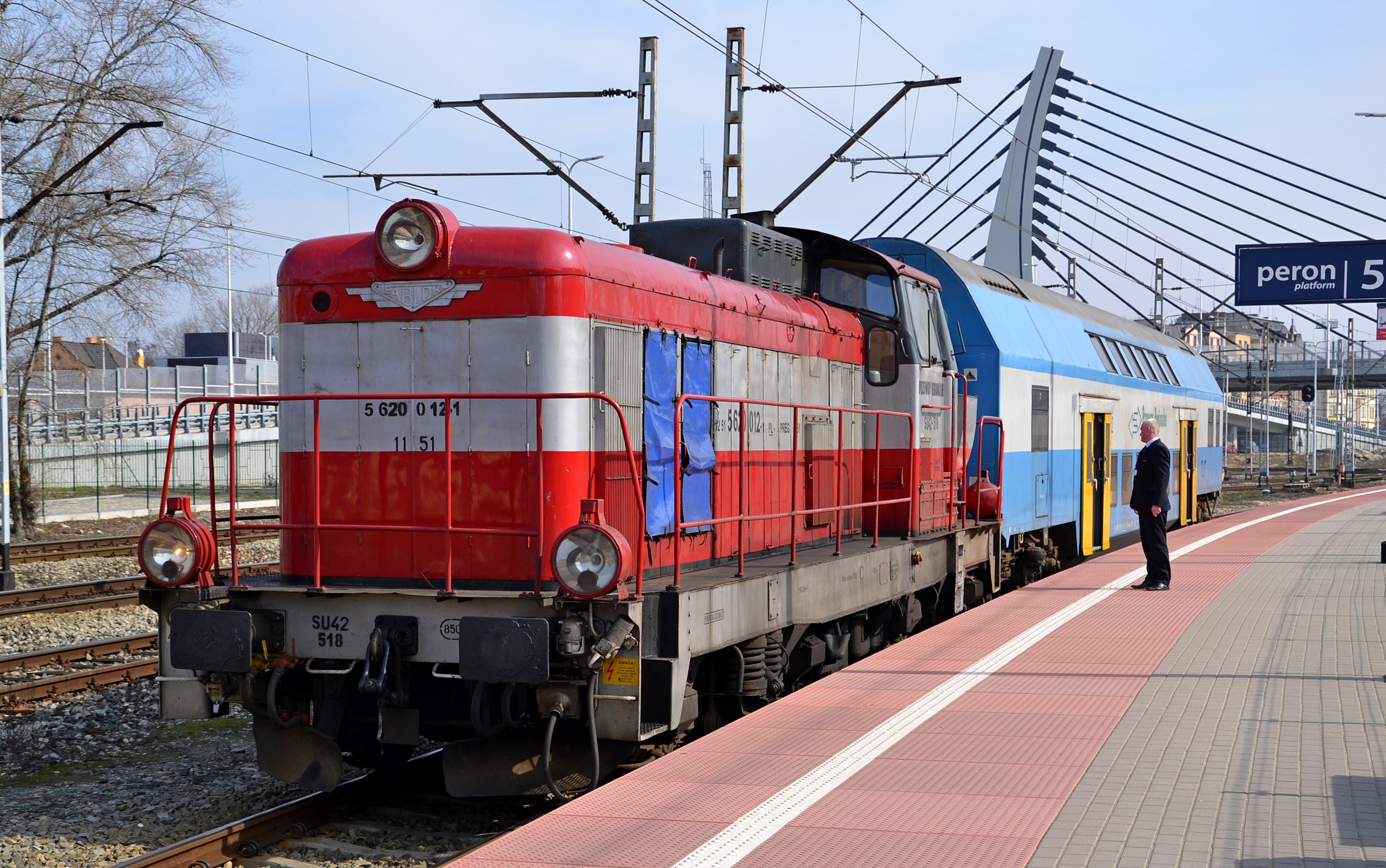
- SU42 locomotive
Type and origin
- Power type: Diesel
- Builder: Fablok
- Build date: 1967–1972
Specifications
- Configuration
  - UIC: Bo′Bo′
- Gauge: 1,435 mm (4 ft 8 1/2 in)
- Driver dia.: 1,100 mm (43.3 in)
- Length: 14,240 mm (46 ft 9 in)
- Width: 3,170 mm (10 ft 5 in)
- Loco weight: 74 tonnes (73 long tons; 82 short tons)
- Fuel capacity: 2,840 litres (620 imp gal; 750 US gal)
- Engine type: a8C22
- Cylinders: 8
- Transmission: Electric
- Loco brake: Oerlikon
Performance figures
- Maximum speed: 90 km/h (56 mph)
- Tractive effort: 228 kN (51,000 lbf)
Career
- Operators: PKP
- Class: SU42

SU42 is a Polish diesel-electric locomotive used for light freight and passenger traffic purposes.

== History ==
The SU42 is in fact the same locomotive as SM42 and SP42. The original class SU42 were modifications of class SM42 done during the 1970s. This modification involved the installation of a 500 volt electric train supply for carriage heating, supplied directly by locomotive's generator. The class retained the original SM42 serial number, however most of those converted have now been converted back to SM42 or withdrawn as the carriages using 500 V supply have been withdrawn.

The second phase of modification was carried out between 1999 and 2000 from class SP42. The modification centered on the addition of 3 kV electric train supply. The modified locomotives were classified as class SU42-5xx. 40 of the class were eventually modified and they are based at various depots across the network. Unlike previous iteration, SU42-5xx has electric train heating powered by a separate Caterpillar diesel engine, thus not creating additional load on the locomotive's main engine while heating the train.

Built for shunting purposes, SM42, together with its version SU42, are widely used in passenger traffic on non-electrified lines.

== Later modifications ==
In the 2000s, a number of companies started offering comprehensive rebuilds of the locomotive, involving the replacement of the prime mover, generator and air compressors, upgraded driver's cab (that better isolates against the engine vibrations the original locomotive was famous for) and various changes to the body. Newag offers modification to type 6Dl that is equipped with 3 kV electric train heating.

Other modifications do not offer the electric train heating, making the modified locomotive a member of the SM42 class. Some of the companies that offer these modifications are:

- Newag – 6Dg, 18D
- Pesa – 6Dk
- Tabor Dębica – 6Dh-1

== Nicknames ==
The described loco used to be called by the following names:

- Zebra or stonka (Colorado beetle) – from the original livery
- Wibrator (Vibrator) – from the vibrations the engine produced
- Eleska – from the factory designation: Ls800
- Fablok – from the producer
- Polsat – from the livery similar to one of Polish popular TV operators' colours

== See also ==
- Polish locomotives designation
