= ČSD Class T 466.2 =

Series of Czechoslovak diesel locomotives

ČSD Class T 466.2 / T 466.3 ČD/ZSSK/ČDC Class 742/743
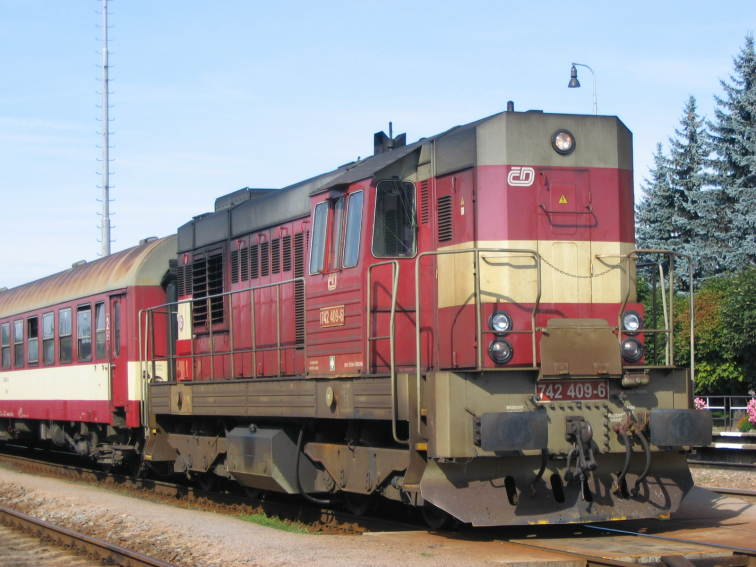
Type and origin
- Power type: Diesel-electric
- Builder: ČKD
- Build date: T 466.2: 1977–1986; T 466.3: 1988
- Total produced: 453
Specifications
- Configuration
  - UIC: Bo′Bo′
- Gauge: 1,435 mm (4 ft 8 1/2 in)
- Wheel diameter: 1,000 mm (3 ft 3 3/8 in)
- Minimum curve: 80 m (262 ft)
- Wheelbase
  - Bogie: 2,400 mm (7 ft 10 1/2 in)
- Pivot centres: 6,700 mm (21 ft 11 3/4 in)
- Length: 13,580 mm (44 ft 6 3/4 in) or 13,600 mm (44 ft 7 1/2 in) over buffers
- Width: 3,130 mm (10 ft 3 1/4 in)
- Height: 4,472 mm (14 ft 8 1/8 in)
- Axle load: 16 tonnes (16 long tons; 18 short tons)
- Loco weight: 64 tonnes (63 long tons; 71 short tons)
- Fuel type: Diesel fuel
- Fuel capacity: 4,000 litres (880 imp gal; 1,100 US gal)
- Prime mover: ČKD K 6 S 230 DR
- RPM range: 1250 (nominal)
- Traction motors: Four
Performance figures
- Maximum speed: 90 km/h (56 mph)
- Power output: 883 kW (1,184 hp)
Career
- Operators: ČSD; ČD; ZSSK; ČDC
- Numbers: ČSD: T 466.2001 – 466.2453; ČD/ZSSK/ČDC: 742.001 – 742.453; 743.001 – 743.010

The ČSD Class T 466.2/3, later ČD,ČDC and ZSSK class 742/3, is a class of diesel locomotives, constructed by ČKD Praha between 1977 and 1986.

== History ==
The locomotive was developed from the ČSD Class T 448.0 shunting locomotive, modified to be more suited to ČSD's needs, including a higher top speed, lower axle loads, and the relevant signalling equipment.

The first series of 60 locomotives started to be delivered in 1977, and were allocated to depots at Bratislava, Leopoldov, Bohumín, Děčín, Trutnov, Plzeň, Ostrava, Hradec Králové, Liberec, and Ústí nad Labem. In total 494 locomotives were built, of which 438 went to the Czechoslovak State Railways

One of the locomotives, T466.2037, was the 10000th locomotive produced by ČKD Praha.
