= ČSD Class T 448.0 =

Czechoslovak locomotive

ČSD class T 448.0 ČD & ZSSK class 740 KSR 내연400 series
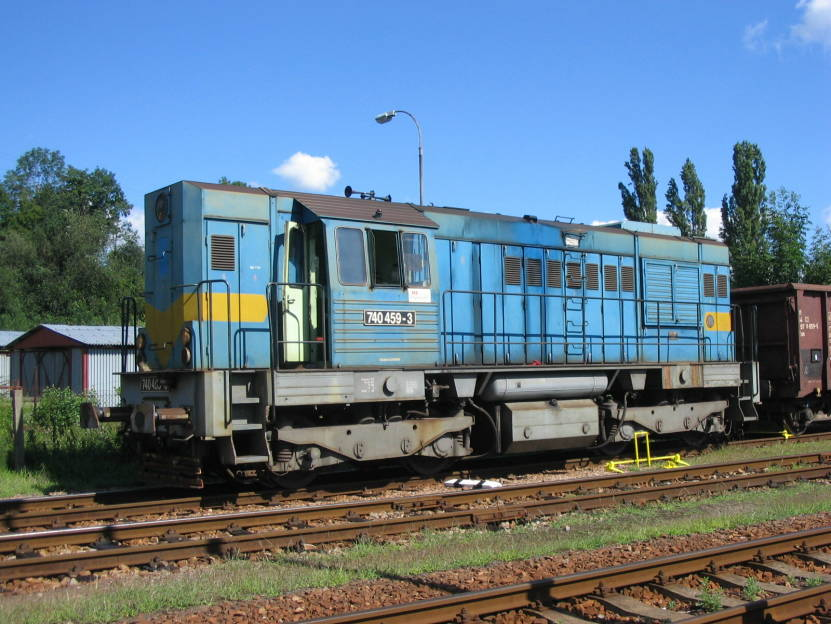
- ČD 740 459 at Vamberk
Type and origin
- Power type: Diesel–electric
- Builder: ČKD; Czechoslovakia
- Build date: 1973-1989
- Total produced: 620
Specifications
- Configuration
  - UIC: Bo′Bo′
- Gauge: 1,435 mm (4 ft 8 1/2 in) standard gauge
- Wheel diameter: 1,000 mm (39.370 in)
- Minimum curve: 80 m (262.47 ft)
- Wheelbase
  - Bogie: 2,400 mm (7 ft 10 1/2 in)
- Pivot centres: 6,700 mm (21 ft 11 3/4 in)
- Length: 13,580 mm (44 ft 6 5/8 in)
- Width: 3,130 mm (10 ft 3 1/4 in)
- Height: 4,359 mm (14 ft 3 5/8 in)
- Axle load: 18 t (18 long tons; 20 short tons)
- Loco weight: 72 t (71 long tons; 79 short tons)
- Fuel type: Diesel
- Fuel capacity: 4,000 L (1,100 US gal; 880 imp gal)
- Prime mover: K6 S 230 DR
- RPM range: 1,250 rpm
- Engine type: Diesel engine
- Aspiration: Turbocharged
- Traction motors: 4× TE 005
- Cylinders: 6 inline
- Cylinder size: 230 mm × 260 mm (9.06 in × 10.24 in)
- Transmission: Electrical (DC/DC)
- Gear ratio: 78:15
- Train brakes: DAKO BS-2 air brakes
- Couplers: Screw (Europe); AAR knuckle (North Korea & Cuba)
Performance figures
- Maximum speed: 70 km/h (43 mph)
- Power output: 883 kW (1,184 hp) @ 1,250 rpm
- Tractive effort
  - Continuous: 133 kN (30,000 lbf) @ 18 km/h (11 mph)

The Class T 448.0 (factory designation 1435 Bó Bó 883) is a group of four-axle diesel–electric locomotives manufactured by ČKD Praha for shunting and freight service on secondary and industrial lines built for industrial use in Czechoslovakia and Poland and for the Czechoslovak State Railways (ČSD). Following the dissolution of Czechoslovakia in 1993, these were divided between the successor companies, the Czech Railways and the Slovak Republic Railways. They have also found their way to a considerable number of private railways in both countries, and ten have been sold to the Korean State Railway of North Korea. Small numbers have also gone elsewhere, such as Italy and Serbia.

== Description ==
In the 1970s, the ČSD had a great need for locomotives for medium-heavy shunting, local freight duties and service in industrial facilities on standard gauge lines in European climatic conditions. Based on the Class T 475.1, built in 1970, a total of 620 T 448.0 locomotives were built between 1973 and 1989, 459 for the ČSD and Czechoslovak industries (T 448.0501 to T 448.0959), along with 161 for enterprises in the Polish coal, metallurgical and chemical industries (T 448-P001 to T 448-P161).

The diesel–electric locomotives of Class T 448.0 are of a "hood unit" design, with a full-width cab offset from the centre, with external walkways alongside the long hood housing the engine, riding on two two-axle bogies (wheel arrangement: Bo-Bo) of standard ČKD design. The bogie frame is an H-shaped structure of welded construction, with two TE-005 DC traction motors. The wheelsets are sprung with a pair of helical springs and dampened by a pair of parallel shock absorbers. The gear ratio is 78:15.

The main chassis is of welded construction using I-beam main stringers; the central part of the frame houses the fuel tank and main air reservoir. The bogies are mounted to the chassis by means of slanted posts providing secondary transverse and vertical suspension. In the cab are two operators' desks with controls for the drive and the DAKO BS-2 air brakes. The cab is heated by excess heat from the diesel engine.

Mounted in the long hood is the prime mover, a six-cylinder inline turbocharged diesel engine of type K6 S 230 DR (bore 230 millimetres (9.1 in) x stroke 260 millimetres (10 in)), directly connected to the TD 805 traction generator. In the front of the hood there is a mechanical compressor, the cooling unit for the traction motors of the front bogie, and the cooling fan drive motors that power a pair of 800 millimetres (31 in) fans which remove heat from the diesel engine's water cooling system.

The central hood is made up of two screw-mounted side panels and a two-piece roof, with hatches for engine access, bolted to the sides. In the space just in front of the cab is a fan cooling the traction motors of the rear bogie, the exciter and a belt-driven charging dynamo, and the muffler. The short rear hood contains the electrical panel and batteries. Electrical devices, the battery master switch, circuit breakers and other switches are directly accessible from the driver's cab.

The locomotives are considered robust and reliable, and as such play an important role in the function for which they were designed. When compared to the Class T 466.2, they have the advantage of better traction and braking performance; however, due to a lack of train heating and their higher axle load, their use is limited to mainline work.

Many units have been leased for use by private railways in the Czech Republic and Slovakia. They are primarily used in pairs. Some units have been scrapped, while others have been modernised to varying degrees - ranging from the installation of an electronic controller all the way to a complete reconstruction as Class 741.

== Czechoslovakia, Czech Republic and Slovakia ==
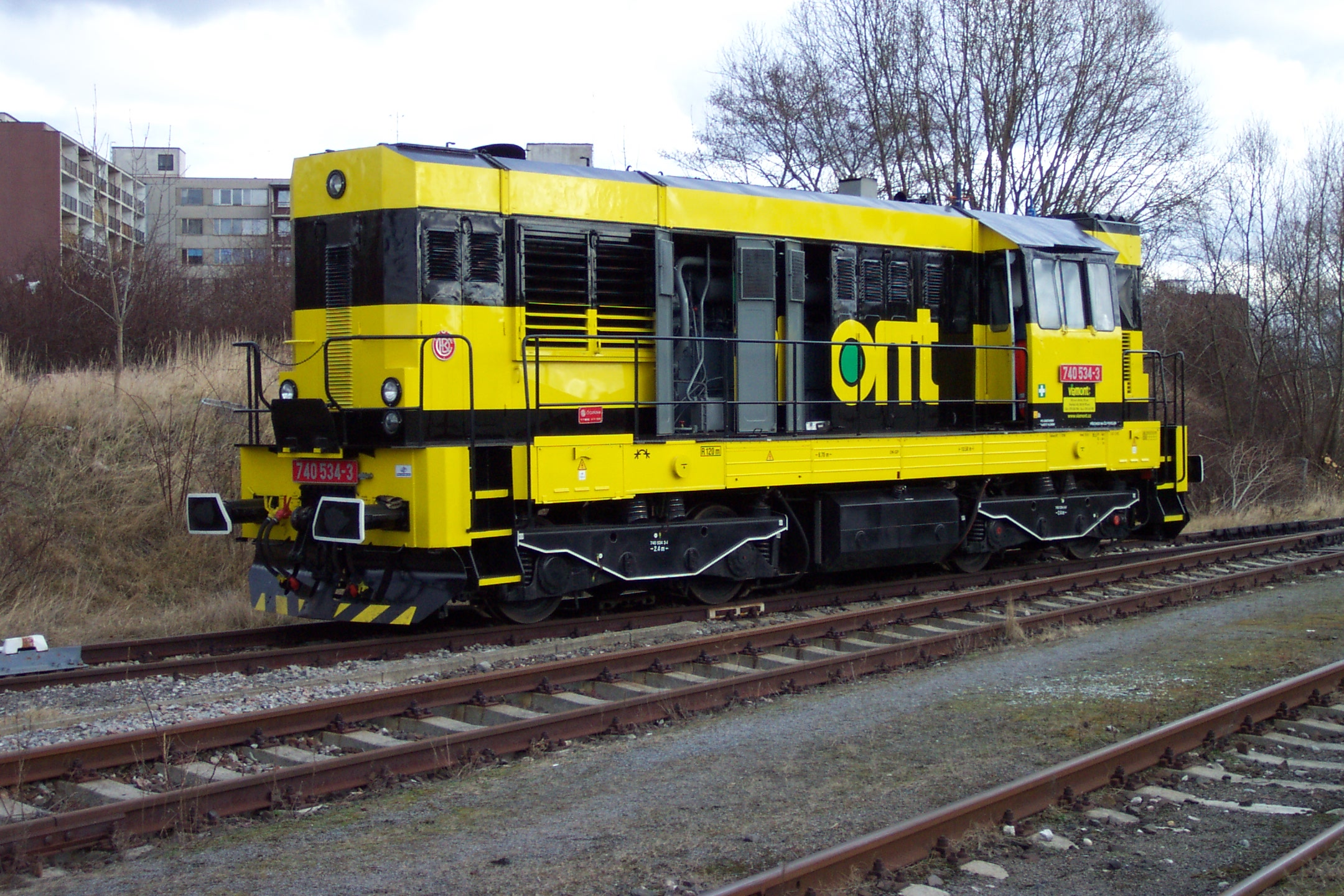
740 534 in Viamont livery in 2007.

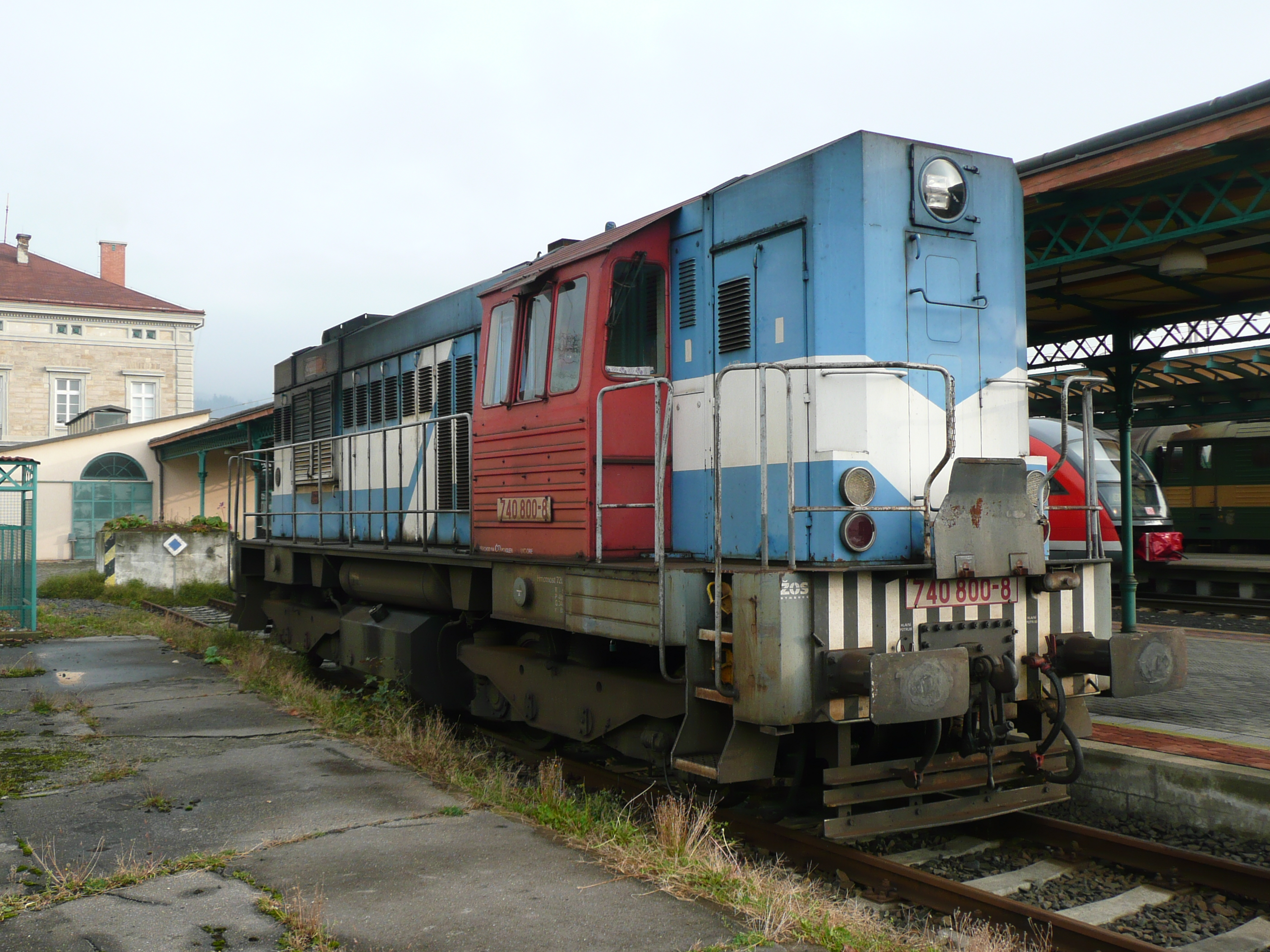
740 800 in Decin in 2012.

The first series of T 448.0 production consisted of eight test units subsequently supplemented by a further sixteen machines, built in late 1973 and early 1974. In order to simplify and improve maintenance, some adjustments were made to the design before production of the second series began; 60 units were built for Czechoslovak industrial operations in 1975-76. Production continued steadily thereafter, with occasional design changes being made as needed, until production of the T 448-class locomotives ended in 1989. 459 units were delivered inside Czechoslovakia, both to the ČSD and to industrial operations; of these, 118 went to industries in Slovakia. The last two units were originally destined for Iran, but ended up delivered to Czech industry. T 446.2037 had the distinction of being the 10,000th locomotive manufactured by ČKD Praha.

Due to the termination of locomotive production at the factory in Martin, the Czechoslovak Ministry of Transport requested the expedited delivery of four-axle locomotives with a power output of 880 kilowatts (1,180 hp) for shunting and light freight service. ČKD modified the T 448.0 design to meet the needs of the ČSD. This resulted in a lightweight universal locomotive, Class T 466.2, which conceptually and dimensionally was identical to the T 448.0.

== Poland ==
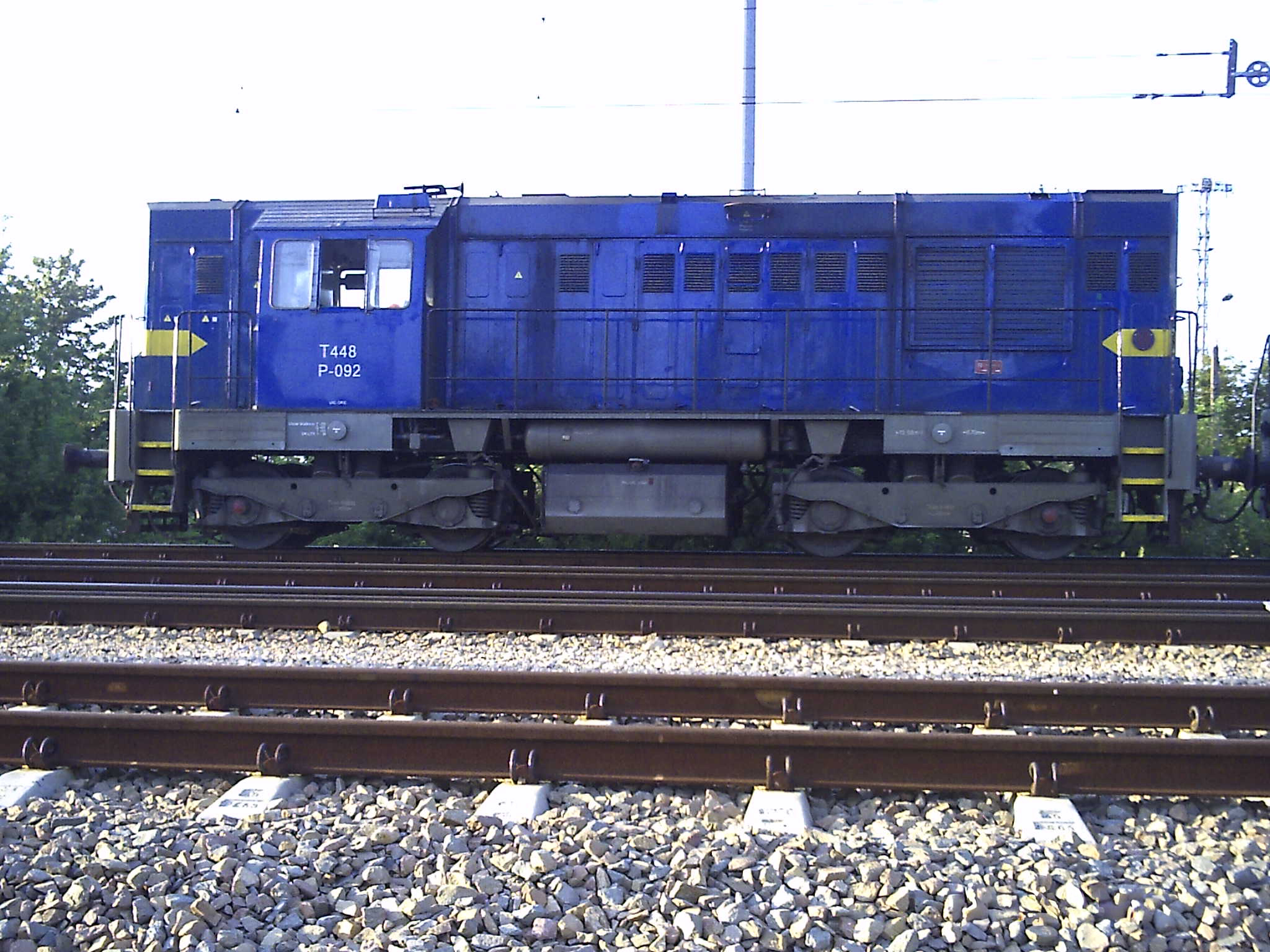
T448P-092 in Poland.

Deliveries of the Polish variant, called Class T 448P, began in 1976, when 32 units were delivered to mining, metallurgical and chemical plants in Poland. These differed from the Czechoslovak units only by the addition of fire detectors and orange marker lights. In total, 161 units were delivered to Polish industry.

Originally delivered to industrial operations, they belong to private carriers such as DB Schenker Rail Rybnik, PTK Holding Zabrze, DB Schenker Rail Polska, PKN Orlen KolTrans, STK Wroclaw and Euronaft Trzebinia. 42 are operated by DBS Rail Polska of a total of 120 still in use in Poland; some have been sold to Czech and Slovak buyers, while five have been sold to North Korea and 2017 and 2018 twice locomotives sold to Continental Railway Solution Kft Hungary.

== Cuba ==
Two locomotives of this type were reportedly delivered second-hand to Ferrocarriles de Cuba.

== North Korea ==
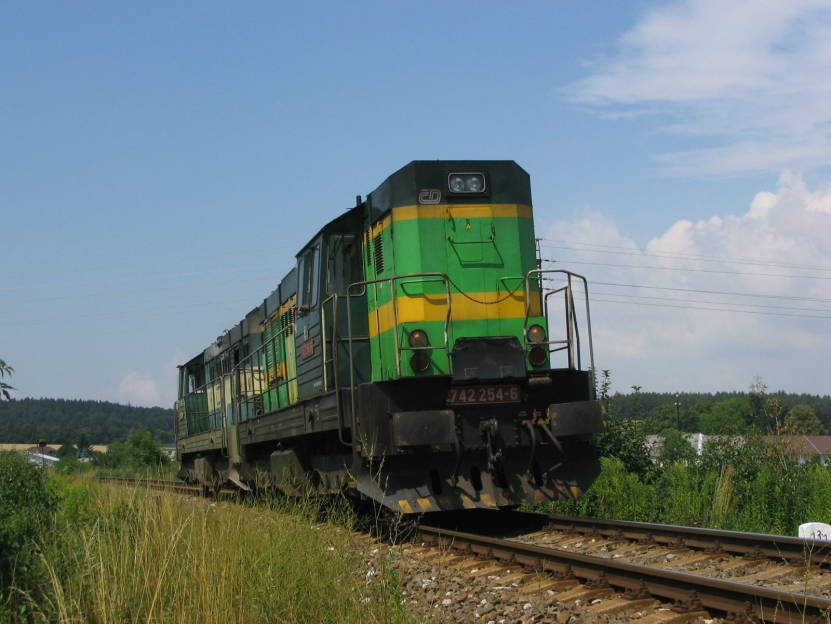
A ČD 742 in paint nearly identical to that found on DPRK locos.

A total of eleven locomotives of this type are in service with the Korean State Railway, for shunting work around P'yŏngyang and light branchline work. These are numbered in the 내연401 to 내연411 range.

After the first unit was delivered on 10 November 2001, the Slovak firm ZŤS - Koľajové vozidlá of Dubnica nad Váhom rebuilt a total of ten T 448.0 locomotives for operation in North Korea, with the first five being shipped on 30 October 2004 via the port of Koper, Slovenia. The second batch of five were shipped on 17 January 2005 by the same routing. All ten were painted in a dark blue, light green and yellow livery with polyurethane paint.

Of the eleven units delivered to the Korean State Railway, five were of the T 448P variant, bought from industrial operations in Poland, while the other six were of the standard version - three from Slovak industries, two from Czech industries, and one from the Czech Railways. These were:

Original number	Build Year	Serial number	Original owner
T 448.0610	1977	9929	ČD 740.610
T 448.0620	1978	10381	Bucina Zvolen, Slovakia
T 448.0637	1978		industrial, Czech Republic
T 448.0646	1978		industrial, Slovakia
T 448-P061	1979		industrial, Poland
T 448-P085	1979	11295	Jasło refinery, Poland
T 448.0817	1984	12812	Slovak Sugar, Rimavská Sobota, Slovakia
T 448-P123	1985		industrial, Poland
T 448-P124	1985		industrial, Poland
T 448.0928	1987		industrial, Czech Republic
T 448-P156	1989	15316	Czechowice refinery, Poland

== Italy ==
Nineteen T 448.0 locomotives have been sold to various Italian companies. Most of these have gone to various railway construction firms, while one was sent to the Sarpom Refinery.

== Uruguay ==
One locomotive (number 740-505-3) was sold in 2015 to the State Railways Administration of Uruguay to work in infrastructure and track maintenance trains. In 2016, the locomotive suffered an accident, but was later repaired and returned to service.

== Serbia ==
Kombinovani Prevoz of Serbia owns seven locomotives of this type, of which some have been leased out to Serbian Railways for use as shunters at Pančevo main station, and on local passenger and freight trains between Pančevo and Vršac.
