= DB Cargo Polska =

Polish rail freight operator

DB Cargo Polska Spółka Akcyjna
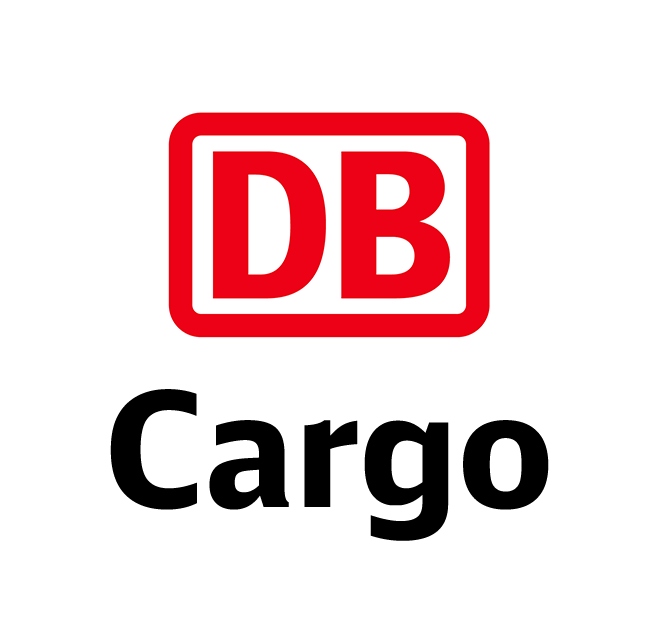
- Company type: Ltd.
- Industry: Rail transport
- Founded: 2001
- Headquarters: Zabrze, Poland
- Key people: Steffen Bobsien; CEO
- Products: Rail transport, Cargo
- Revenue: 440 million € (2008)
- Number of employees: 6000 (2008)
- Website: pl.dbcargo.com

DB Cargo Polska (formerly DB Schenker Rail Polska and PCC Rail) is a Polish company operating mainly in rail freight transportation. It is presently owned by the German state railway company Deutsche Bahn (DB).

The primary materials transported by the company have traditionally been coal, gas, oil products and sand. In 2008, the volume of freight handled by the company amounted to in excess of 90 million tons.

== History ==
PCC Rail Szczakowa emerged from a local mining-transport company of the Sand Mine Szczakowa (Kopalnia Piasku Szczakowa), having operated as such for over 50 years. During 2000, it was acquired by German chemicals and logistics company PCC SE. On 16 November 2006, the company's name was shortened to PCC Rail. By the end of 2008, PCC Rail reportedly had a market share in the Polish rail freight sector of 8%.

During January 2009, PCC announced the sale of its Polish rail logistics subsidiary to the German state railway company Deutsche Bahn (DB); at the time of the transaction, PCC Rail was the largest privately owned railway company operating in Poland. The acquisition of the company, which was initially rebranded as DB Schenker Rail Poland, was one part of a wider trend towards consolidation that was occurring across Europe at that time.

By mid-2012, it was reported that almost half of all rail freight in Poland was being carried by one of several open-access operators, the largest being DB Schenker Rail Poland, having proved to be highly competitive with the nation's incumbent operator PKP Cargo. DB's share of the market was reportedly 20.9%. Nevertheless, Hans Georg Werner, the CEO of DB Schenker Rail Poland publicly accused PKP Cargo of conducting anti-competitive practices, specifically that it had unreasonably prevented the company from accessing its terminal outside Lublin, and thus hampering rivals from running their own intermodal freight services; the accusation was disputed by PKP Cargo's management. Three years later, the heads of DB Schenker Rail Polska, Freightliner PL, and CTL Logistics jointly voiced their concerns that high charges for track access and the poor quality of some infrastructure were hindering the development of the rail freight sector in Poland; specifically, there was little modernisation work, a shortage of suitable sidings for loading/unloading, a lack of facilities to handle intermodal freight, and allegations of monopolistic practices by PKP Cargo.

During March 2020, DB Cargo Polska transported thousands of tonnes of humanitarian aid from across Europe to neighbouring Ukraine as a part of the international response to the outbreak of the 2022 Russian invasion of Ukraine. By August 2020, the company was one of several rail freight companies actively participating in the land shipment of grain out of Ukraine and across Europe; traditionally it would have been transported by ship via the nation's ports on the Black Sea, but this route had been blockaded by the Russian Navy.

== Rolling stock ==
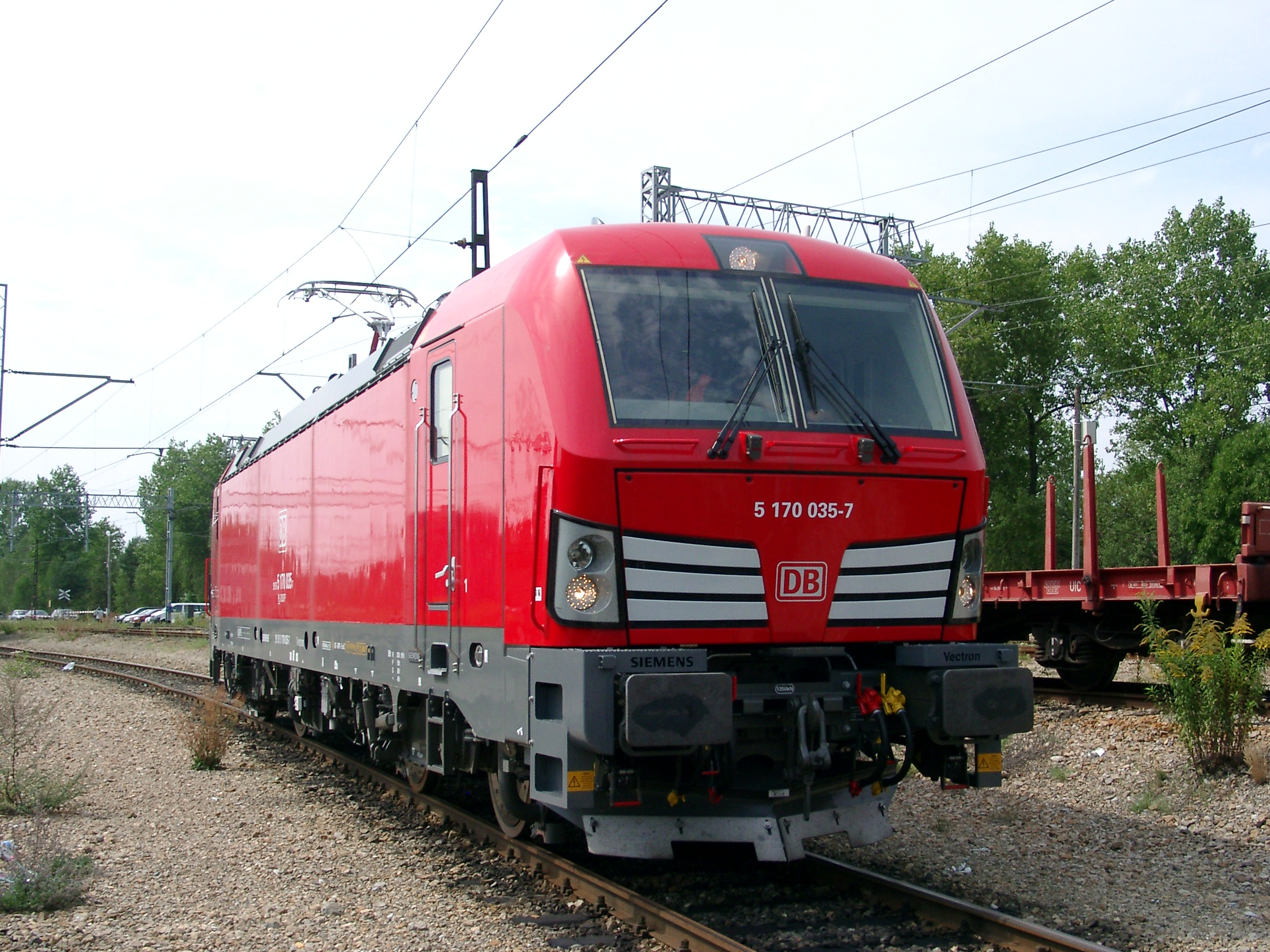
Siemens Vectron

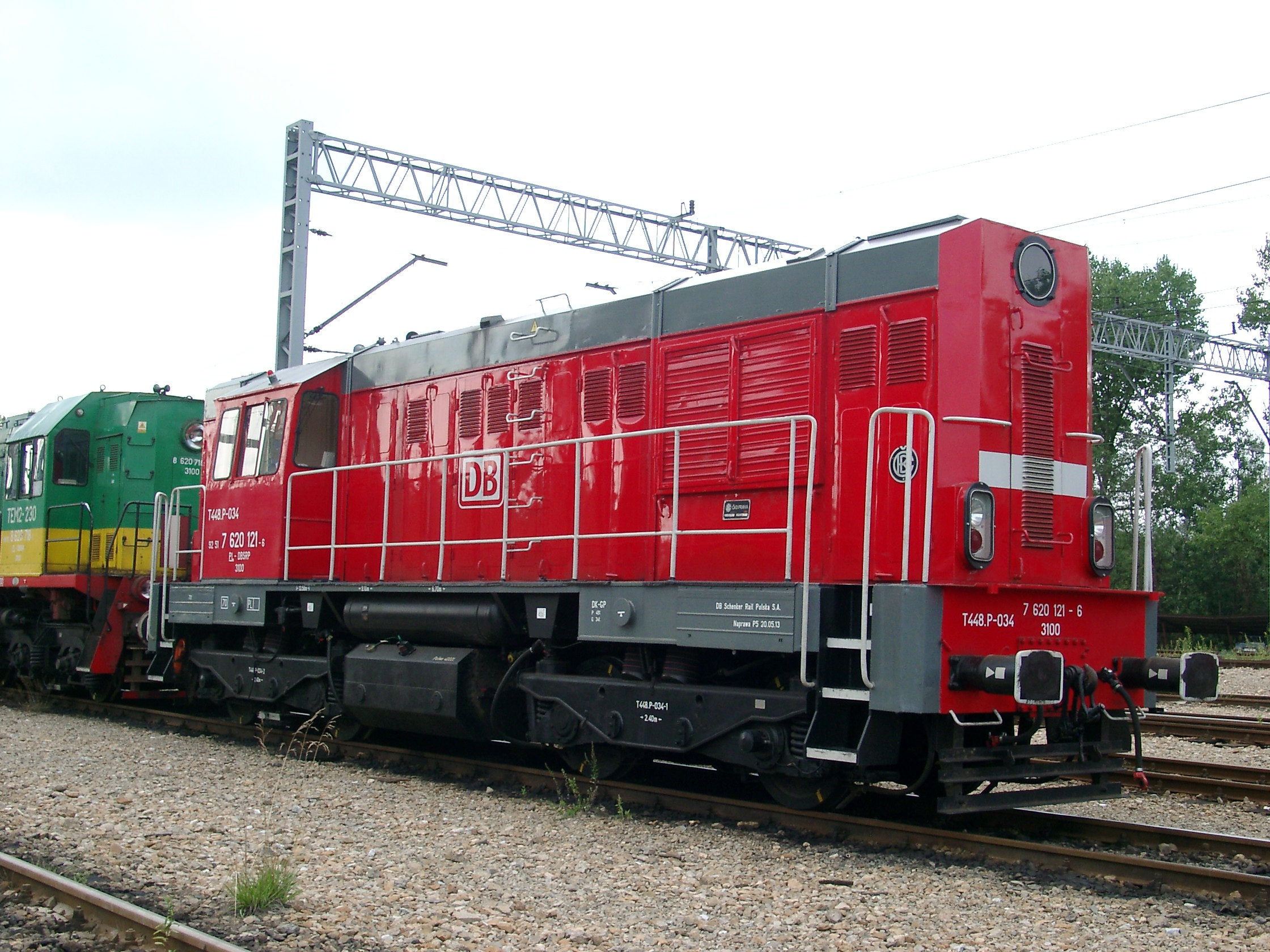
ČSD Class T 448.0

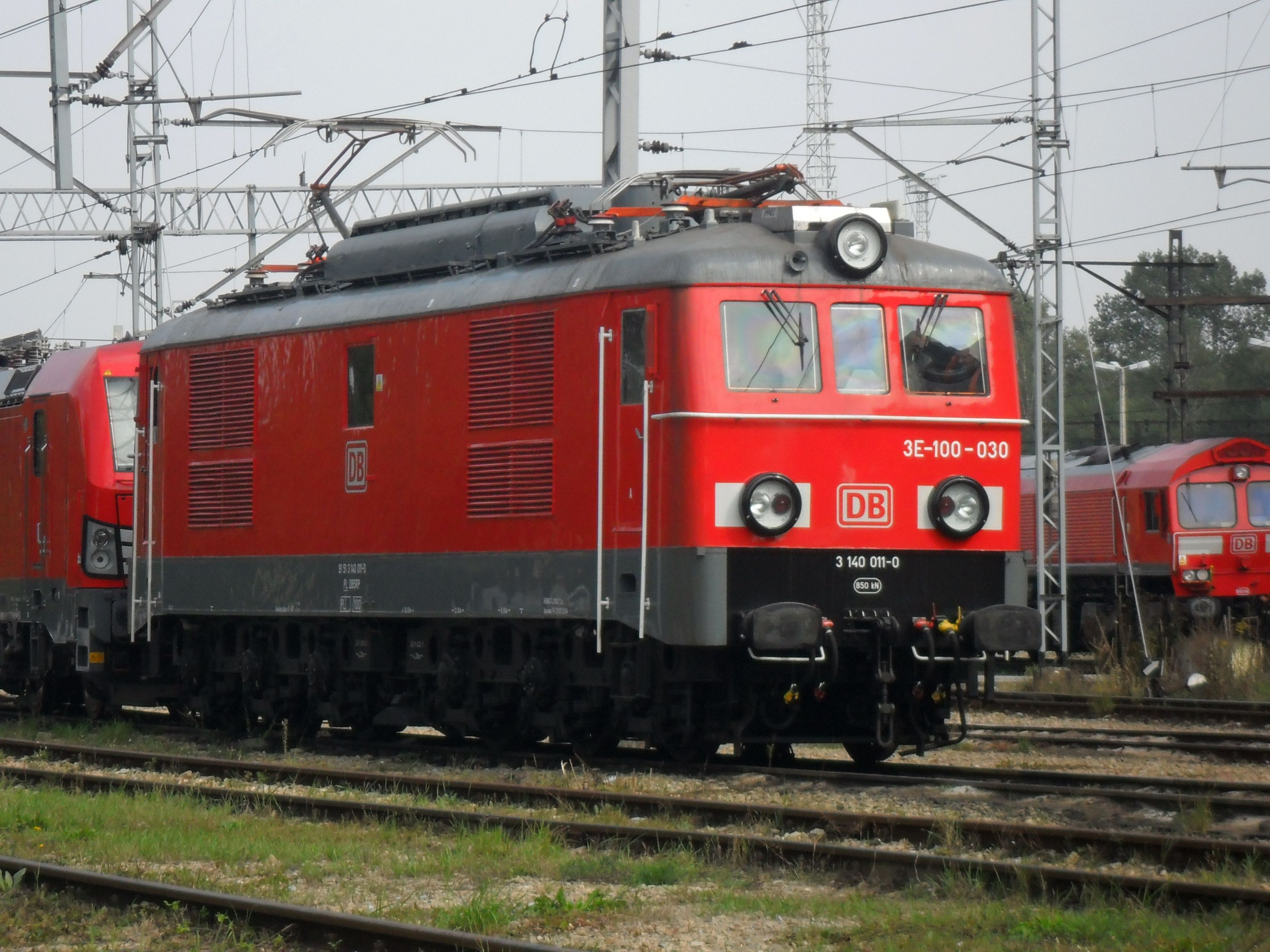
ET21

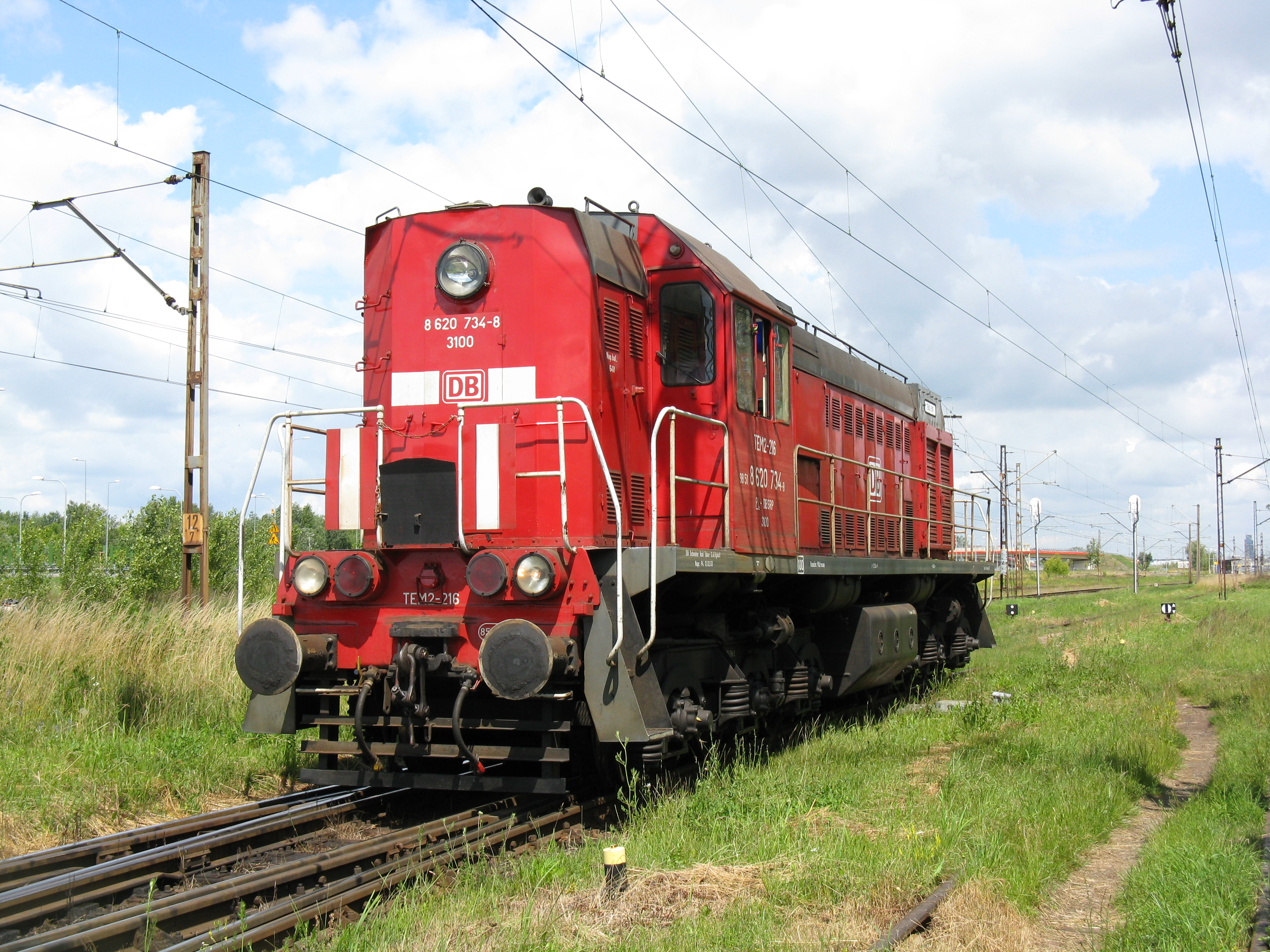
TEM2

In 2010, DB Cargo Polska owned 360 locomotives along with 7,700 wagons and other forms of rolling stock.

During December 2012, following a reportedly successful trial, DB Cargo Polska placed an order for 23 Siemens Vectron electric locomotives; these units, which were assembled at Siemens' Munich plant, were delivered by the end of 2015. The contract includes an option for an additional 13 locomotives. The Vectron was the first locomotive designed to conform with the Technical Specification for Interoperability, facilitating the easier operation of cross-border services.

Model	In stock
BR232	10
311D	12
M62	4
SM42	5
SM31	1
Ls1000	1
T448p	42
TEM2	63
Class 66	15
BR170	15
182	9
ET21	23
E189	1
MaK DE 6400	7
Total	201

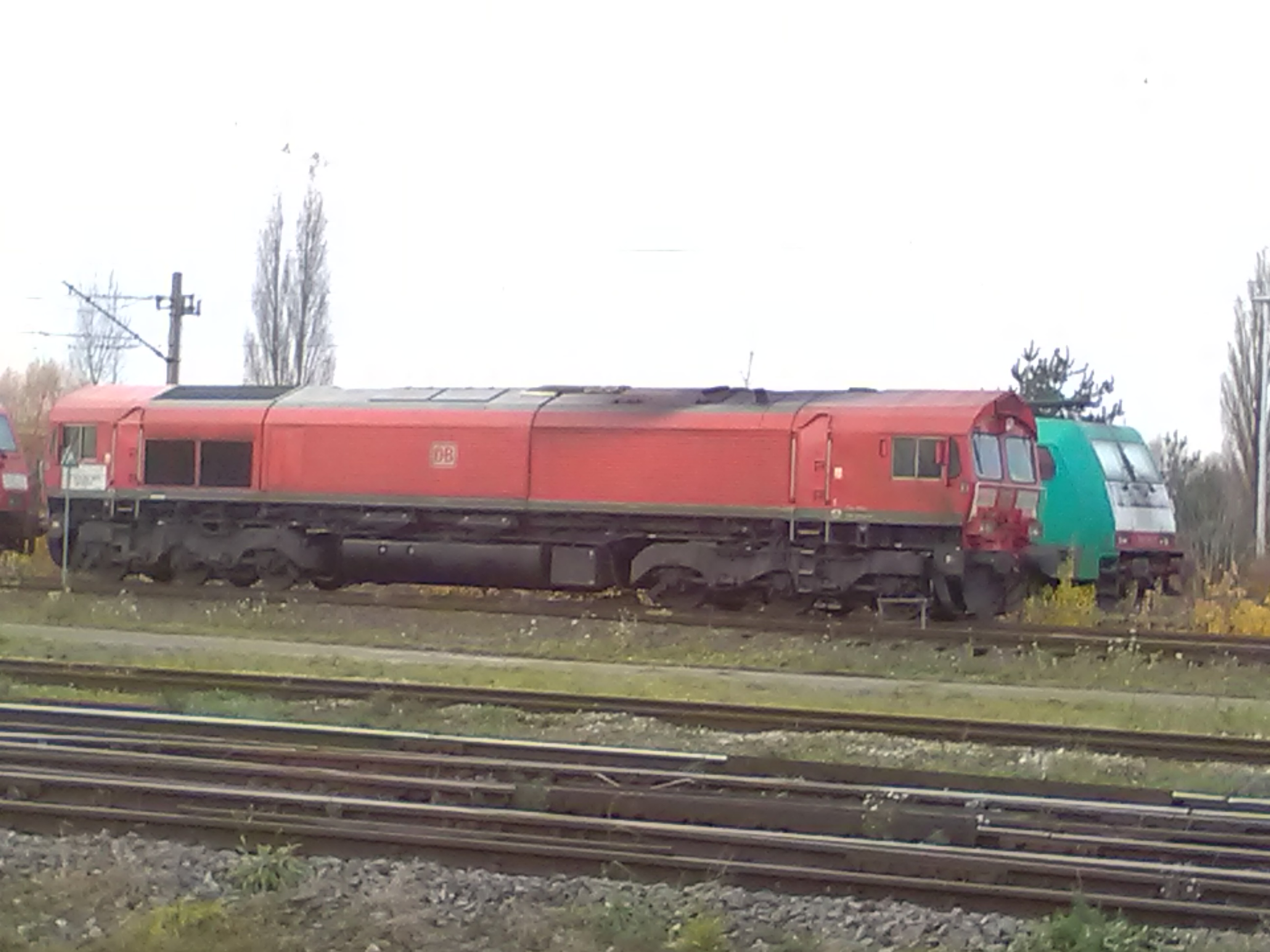
Class 66

== Dependent companies ==
- DB Port Szczecin Sp. z o.o., Szczecin (Poland) – 93,40%
- Infra SILESIA S.A., Rybnik (Poland) – 100%
- DB Cargo Spedkol Sp. z o.o., Kędzierzyn-Koźle (Poland) – 100%

== See also ==
- Transportation in Poland
- List of railway companies
- Polish locomotives designation
