= PCC SE =

Chemicals multinational, based in Germany

- Company type: Societas Europaea
- Industry: Chemicals, silicon, logistics,
- Founded: October 1993; 32 years ago in Duisburg, Germany
- Founder: Waldemar Preussner
- Headquarters: Duisburg-Homberg, Germany
- Key people: Dr. Peter Wenzel (CEO/Chairman of the Executive Board); Riccardo Koppe (Executive Board Member); Dr. rer. oec. (BY) Alfred Pelzer (Executive Board Member); Waldemar Preussner (Chairman of the Supervisory Board)
- Products: Chemicals, polyols, surfactants, chlorine, MCAA, silicon, specialty chemicals including phosphorus derivatives and alkylphenols, consumer products, raw materials, quartzite, logistics and intermodal transport
- Revenue: ▼€960.0 million (2024)
- Operating income: ▼€1.9 million (2024)
- Net income: ▼€-48.0 million (2024)
- Number of employees: 3,295 (31 December 2024)
- Website: www.pcc.eu

PCC SE is an international chemicals, silicon and logistics corporation. Headquartered in Duisburg, Germany, the PCC Group has about 3,300 employees worldwide. It comprises 68 subsidiaries located at 41 sites in 18 countries, with production facilities in Europe, Asia and the United States. The sole shareholder of the group's parent and holding company PCC SE is Waldemar Preussner, chairman of the supervisory board.

== History ==
In October 1993, Waldemar Preussner and partners established Petro Carbo Chem Rohstoffhandelsgesellschaft mbH (today PCC Trade & Services GmbH), a commodity trading company, in Duisburg. In 1998, PCC AG was formed as a spin-off and in February 2007, converted into a Societas Europaea (SE). In 1998, PCC SE was one of the first medium-sized German companies to start issuing bonds directly, independently of banks. Since then, corporate bonds have formed the main financing instrument of the group holding company.

The PCC group has expanded and diversified through acquisitions and project investments. Particularly in Poland and elsewhere in Central and Eastern Europe, PCC acquired various previously state-owned companies, which it then modernized and expanded. In 2010, PCC completed the takeover of a Polish chemicals producer, known today as PCC Rokita SA, the largest group subsidiary.

PCC SE has placed minority stakes of two Polish chemical companies on the Warsaw Stock Exchange, PCC Rokita SA (initial public offering in 2014) and PCC Exol SA (2012). Logistics company PCC Intermodal S.A. (IPO in 2009) was delisted from the Warsaw Stock Exchange in 2018. As a major divestiture, in 2009, PCC sold its Polish subgroup PCC Logistics to Deutsche Bahn AG (today DB Cargo Polska).

Investments further afield include US specialty surfactants developer PCC Chemax, Inc. Activities are also being pursued in Asia through the acquisition of a total of 50% of Thai polyols and polyurethane producer IRPC Polyol Company Ltd. In Iceland, PCC commissioned, in 2018, a silicon metal production plant at a cost of around US$300 million powered by geothermal energy.

In 2024, PCC generated consolidated revenue of €960.0 million. Earnings before interest and other financial items, taxes, depreciation and amortization (EBITDA) amounted to €88.0 million, and earnings before taxes (EBT) were €-29.5 million.

== Segments ==
The group annual report for 2024 lists 49 material portfolio companies as affiliated entities of PCC SE, allocated to the seven segments: Polyols & Derivatives, Surfactants & Derivatives, Chlorine & Derivatives, Silicon & Derivatives, Trading & Services, Logistics, and Holding & Projects.

=== Chemical segments ===
The group's main revenue generator are the three Chemicals segments Polyols & Derivatives, Surfactants & Derivatives and Chlorine & Derivatives. Its production activities are located primarily in Poland. The largest company is PCC Rokita SA, headquartered in Brzeg Dolny. Among its products are polyether polyols, a feedstock used in the manufacture of PU foams for items such as mattresses. It is also a chlorine producer. PCC Exol SA, Brzeg Dolny, is a Polish manufacturer of surfactants.

=== Silicon and derivatives segment ===
In the silicon and derivatives segment, PCC operates a silicon metal production facility in Húsavík, Iceland, which is powered by 100% electricity from renewable energy sources. The plant obtains the quartzite raw material from the PCC quarry in Poland.

=== Logistics segment ===
The logistics segment is dominated by PCC Intermodal S.A., a combined road and rail logistics services provider in Eastern Europe with five wholly owned container transshipment terminals in Poland and Germany. The company operates container block train services between the Polish inland terminals of PCC, seaports located in Germany, and the Benelux countries, among other destinations.

=== Holding and projects segment ===
This segment manages major projects such as the construction of a production plant for Oxyalkylates in Malaysia in a joint venture with Petronas Chemicals Group which was commissioned in 2023.

== Corporate citizenship ==
The company is the name sponsor of the PCC Stadium in Duisburg, the home venue of local soccer teams. PCC SE supports the homeless relief association Gemeinsam gegen Kälte Duisburg e.V., German children's rights organization Deutscher Kinderschutzbund in Duisburg and the Amani Orphans' Home Mbigili (AOHM), a Tanzanian non-governmental organization that cares for AIDS orphans in the region. Group companies PCC Rokita SA and PCC Exol SA received a silver and a gold medal, respectively, from the international collaborative sustainability platform, EcoVadis, for their reporting on corporate social responsibility. From 2016 to 2019, PCC Rokita SA was included in the Respect Index, the social responsibility index of companies listed on the Warsaw Stock Exchange.

== See also ==
- List of German companies
