= ZNTK Poznań Regio Tramp =

Polish railbus family

SA105, SA108
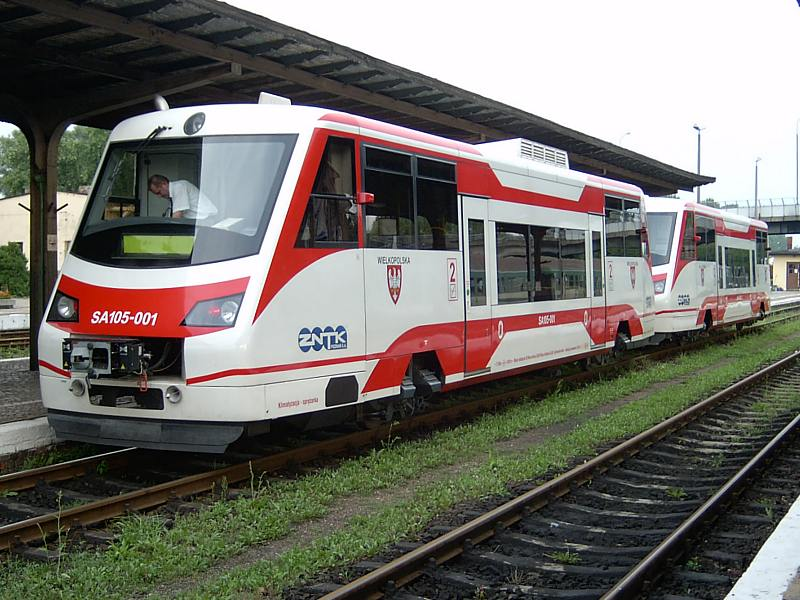
- SA105-001 and SA105-002 at Wolsztyn railway station
- Manufacturer: ZNTK Poznań
- Assembly: Poznań, Poland
- Constructed: 2002–2007
- Number built: 17

Specifications
- Width: 2,900 mm (110 in)
- Height: 3,800 mm (150 in)
- Wheel diameter: 840 mm (33 in)
- Maximum speed: 100 km/h (62 mph)
- Engine type: MAN
- Transmission: Voith 863.3p torque converter

ZNTK Poznań Regio Tramp is a family of standard-gauge railbuses manufactured by ZNTK Poznań. Seven one-unit vehicles (types 213M and 213Ma, series SA105) and ten two-unit vehicles (type 215M, series SA108) were built between 2002 and 2007. A three-unit version (type 216M) was planned but never produced. The railbuses are operated by Greater Poland Railways, who own six units, and Polregio, who own eleven units.

== History ==
=== Background ===
By the mid-1990s, the PKP Group owned six railbuses manufactured by Kolzam (SN81 and SA104) and six produced by ZNTK Poznań (SA101 and SA102). In the 1990s, PKP planned to make significant purchases of new rolling stock: sixteen Pendolino trainsets, fifty EU11/EU43 locomotives from Adtranz-Pafawag, and several hundred railbuses for local routes. The tender for the Pendolino trains was cancelled in 2000 following an audit by the Supreme Audit Office. Although the tender for the locomotives was not cancelled, none of them entered service in Poland due to PKP's financial situation, and all were sold to Ferrovie dello Stato Italiane, the Italian national railway company, in 2002.

The adoption of the PKP Restructuring Act in 2000 changed the way regional transport was financed, establishing PKP Przewozy Regionalne (later Polregio) and requiring local governments to allocate a portion of their funds toward the purchase of rolling stock. Drawing on experience from earlier preparations, ZNTK Poznań proposed to local governments the Regio Tramp family of railbuses in one-, two-, and three-unit versions. In addition to ZNTK Poznań, Kolzam also participated in the tenders with its RegioVan, as did Pesa (formerly ZNTK Bydgoszcz) with its Partner.

The first order for the Regio Tramp came from the Marshal's Office of the Greater Poland Voivodeship, which ordered two single-unit vehicles. The first of these began testing in April 2002 at the Railway Scientific and Technical Center in Warsaw.

== Design ==
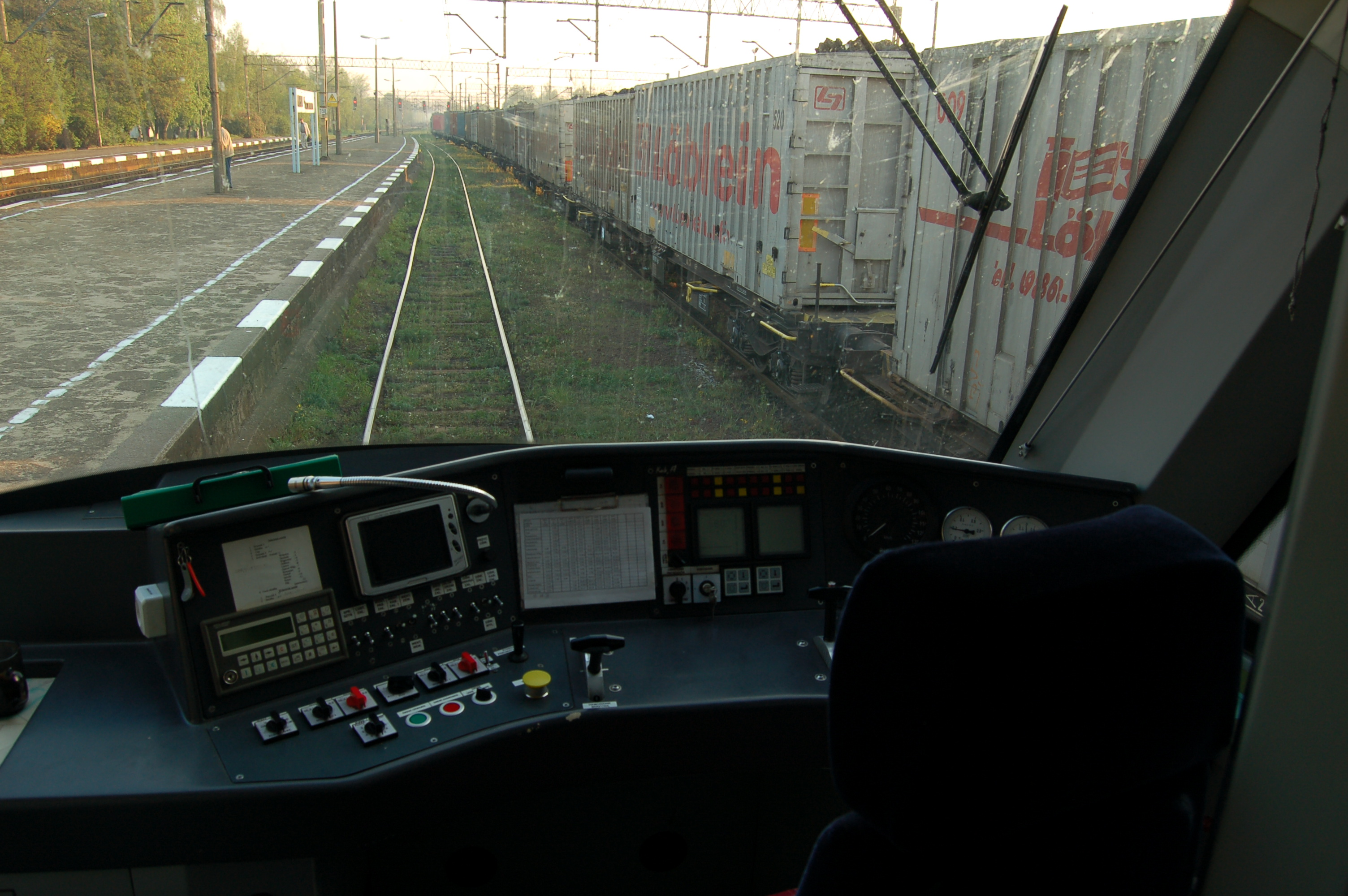
Driver's cab

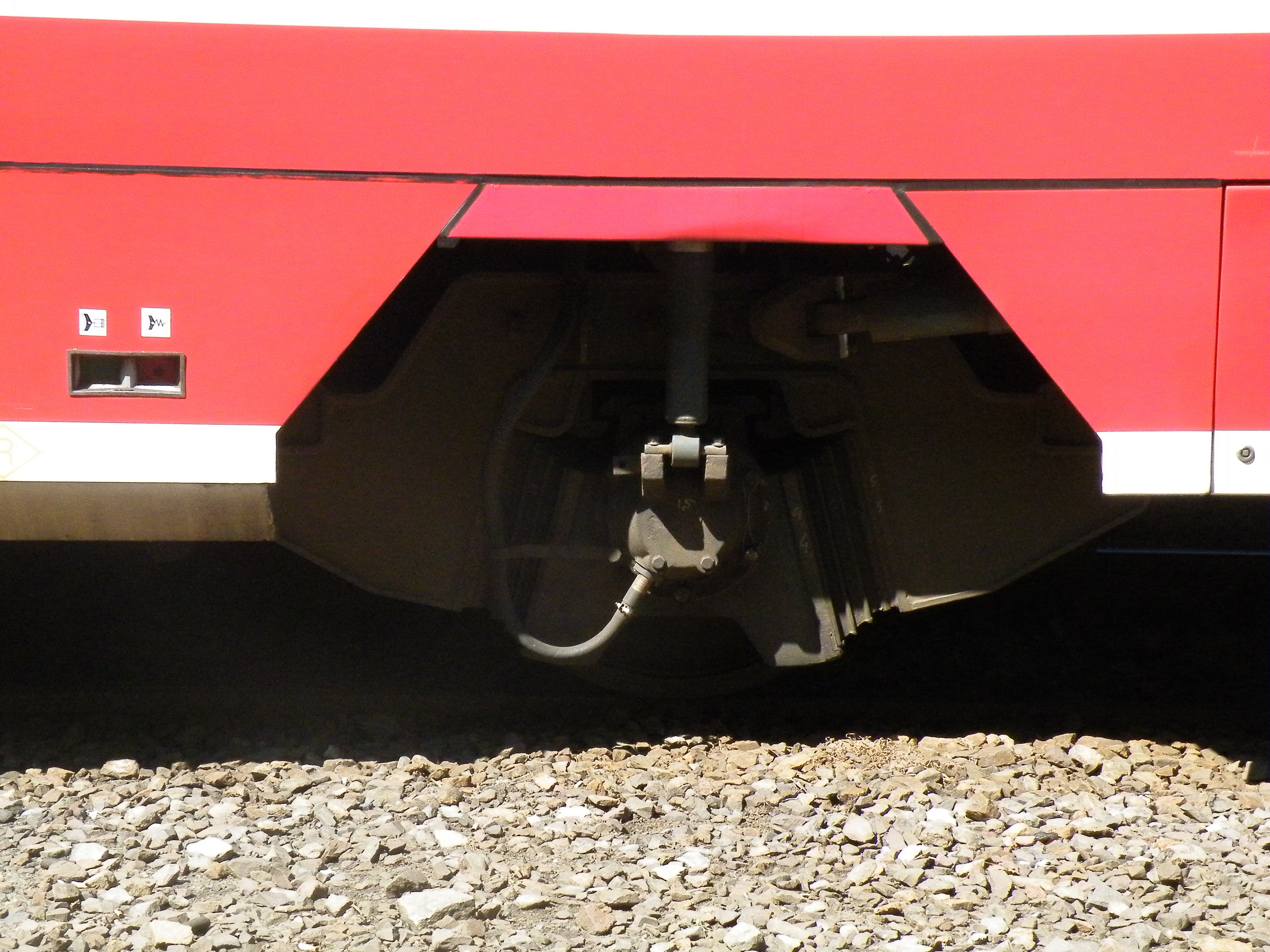
Bogie

Regio Tramps are single-space, partially low-floor railbuses designed for regional passenger service on less-busy, mainly non-electrified lines. They were produced in one- and two-unit versions. Although plans for a three-unit configuration existed, it was never built.

Regio Tramps have a lightweight, modular body design with a lowered floor in the entrance area, down to 600 mm above rail level. There is a designated area for wheelchair users and for transporting bicycles. Three steps lead up to the raised sections.

The bodies are mounted on bogies using a two-stage suspension system. The first stage consists of chevron metallic-rubber springs, and the second consists of pneumatic and metallic-rubber springs – the latter serve as a backup in the event of a loss of air pressure in the airbags.

Both the 213M car and each 215M unit are equipped with one single-axle motor bogie (type 19MN) and one single-axle trailer bogie (type 32AN), both fitted with wheelsets with disc brakes. In the planned three-unit version, the middle unit was to be detachable. The power unit – a diesel engine integrated with a torque converter and a hydrodynamic brake – is located under the floor beneath the motor bogie in a power-pack arrangement.

The vehicles are equipped with standard train protection systems: vigilance control, automatic train braking, and Radio-Stop.

=== Variants ===
Type	Number of units	Wheel arrangement	Service weight	Length	Number and power of engines	Engine type	Seated capacity	Total capacity	Number built	Sources
213M	1	A'1'	28 tn	17,000 mm	1 × 257 kW	MAN D2866 LUH21	36+7	90	2	
213Ma	1	A'1'	24 tn	17,720 mm	1 × 257 kW	MAN D2866 LUH21	35–44	90	5	
215M	2	A'1'+1'A'	56 tn	34,720 mm	2 × 257 kW	MAN D2866 LUH21; MAN D2876 LUE21	100+10; 90+8; 82+16	205; 198 –	10	
216M	3	A'1'+1'1'+1'A'		52,320 mm	2 × 257 kW	—	137	292	0	

==== 213M and 213Ma ====
The 213M vehicles are equipped with two pairs of single-leaf doors with an 800 mm clearance, while the 213Ma have one pair of double-leaf doors. The 213M models have Scharfenberg automatic couplings (allowing both 213M units to operate in double-unit formation), while the 213Ma have screw couplings and buffers. The 213M models are equipped with cameras instead of side mirrors. Originally, the first 213M (SA105-001) did not have a restroom.

==== 215M ====
The 215M vehicles are equipped with two pairs of double-leaf doors with a clearance of 1,300 mm, as well as screw couplings and buffers. In the low-floor sections, one unit has a space designated for transporting bicycles, while the other has a restroom. Some vehicles have a larger restroom and slightly fewer seats.

=== Modernizations ===
In 2009, both of Greater Poland's 213M vehicles (SA105-001 and 002) were modernized by Pesa in Bydgoszcz. The first vehicle was fitted with a restroom, and air conditioning was installed in both vehicles. In August 2015, the Marshal's Office of Greater Poland Voivodeship announced a tender for the next modernization of SA105-001.

On 13 August 2013, the Greater Poland Marshal's Office placed an order with Pesa for the modernisation of two 215M-type vehicles, which included the installation of a front-view camera system, the modernization of the passenger information system, and the installation of a battery power supply system for the second unit in the event of an engine failure. On 30 June 2014, the Marshal's Office signed a contract with Pesa extending the scope of the order to include one additional 215M-type vehicle (SA108-001). In September 2016, it was decided to expand the order to include the modernization of unit SA108-008.

On 26 May 2014, the Lubusz Marshal's Office placed an order with Pesa for the modernisation and major overhaul of one 213Ma (SA105-105) and one 215M (SA108-006) vehicle. As part of this modernization, the vehicles were equipped with, among other things, a front-view camera system, an upgraded passenger information system, and an automatic passenger counting system. In the 215M vehicle, one of the two restroom compartments was removed, and a battery power supply system for the second unit was installed to be used in the event of an engine failure. On 16 June 2015, the Marshal's Office awarded a contract to H. Cegielski – Fabryka Pojazdów Szynowych for the modernization of SA105-101 (the scope of this modernization was similar to that of unit No. 105), and in August 2015 for the modernization of SA105-102; the work on SA105-101 was completed in early 2015. In January 2016, the Marshal's Office announced a tender for the modernization of SA105-104. The only bid in this tender was submitted by H. Cegielski, and a contract was signed. The repair was completed in July.

On 1 July 2019, the Podlaskie branch of Polregio signed a contract with a consortium of Serwis Pojazdów Szynowych Lisi Ogon and Piotr Mieczkowski Autoryzowany Serwis Pojazdów Szynowych Trzeciewnica for the modernization of SA105-103 and SA108-007, including, among other things, the replacement of passenger seats, the installation of a ticket machine, a passenger counting system, wireless internet, USB chargers, a new passenger information system, and a monitoring system. In May 2020, the work on SA105-103 was completed.

In 2019, the Marshal's Office of Greater Poland Voivodeship conducted a tender for the modernization of SA108-010, but it did not take place, since the only bid exceeded the planned budget. In February 2020, the tender was reopened and 3 bids were submitted. The modernization included the replacement of passenger seats, surveillance systems, passenger information displays, a 230 V external power supply, a power supply for the second unit, passenger blinds, separation of the heating system from the exhaust system, improved lighting, and the addition of bins.

=== Naming issue ===
According to PKP classifications, SA105 and SA108 are railbuses (Polish: autobusy szynowe); however, the SA105 could also be classified as a diesel railcar, and the SA108 as a diesel multiple unit. The criterion for classifying a vehicle as a railbus is the imprecisely defined "lightness" of the rolling stock. Ultimately, the decision to classify the Regio Tramp vehicles as railbuses was influenced by preferential infrastructure access rates for this type of vehicle. Additional confusion is introduced by the national infrastructure manager – PKP Polskie Linie Kolejowe – which uses the colloquial term "szynobus" in its train route allocation regulations.

== Operations ==
Ownership	Type	Series	No.	Unit numbers	Operator	Ref.
Lubusz Voivodeship	213Ma	SA105	4	101–102, 104–105	Polregio	
Lubusz Voivodeship	215M	SA108	1	006	Polregio	
Podlaskie Voivodeship	213Ma	SA105	1	103	Polregio	
Podlaskie Voivodeship	215M	SA108	2	007, 009	Polregio	
Greater Poland Voivodeship	213M	SA105	2	001–002	Greater Poland Railways	
Greater Poland Voivodeship	215M	SA108	7	001–003, 010	Greater Poland Railways	
Greater Poland Voivodeship	215M	SA108	7	004–005, 008	Polregio	

=== Greater Poland Voivodeship ===
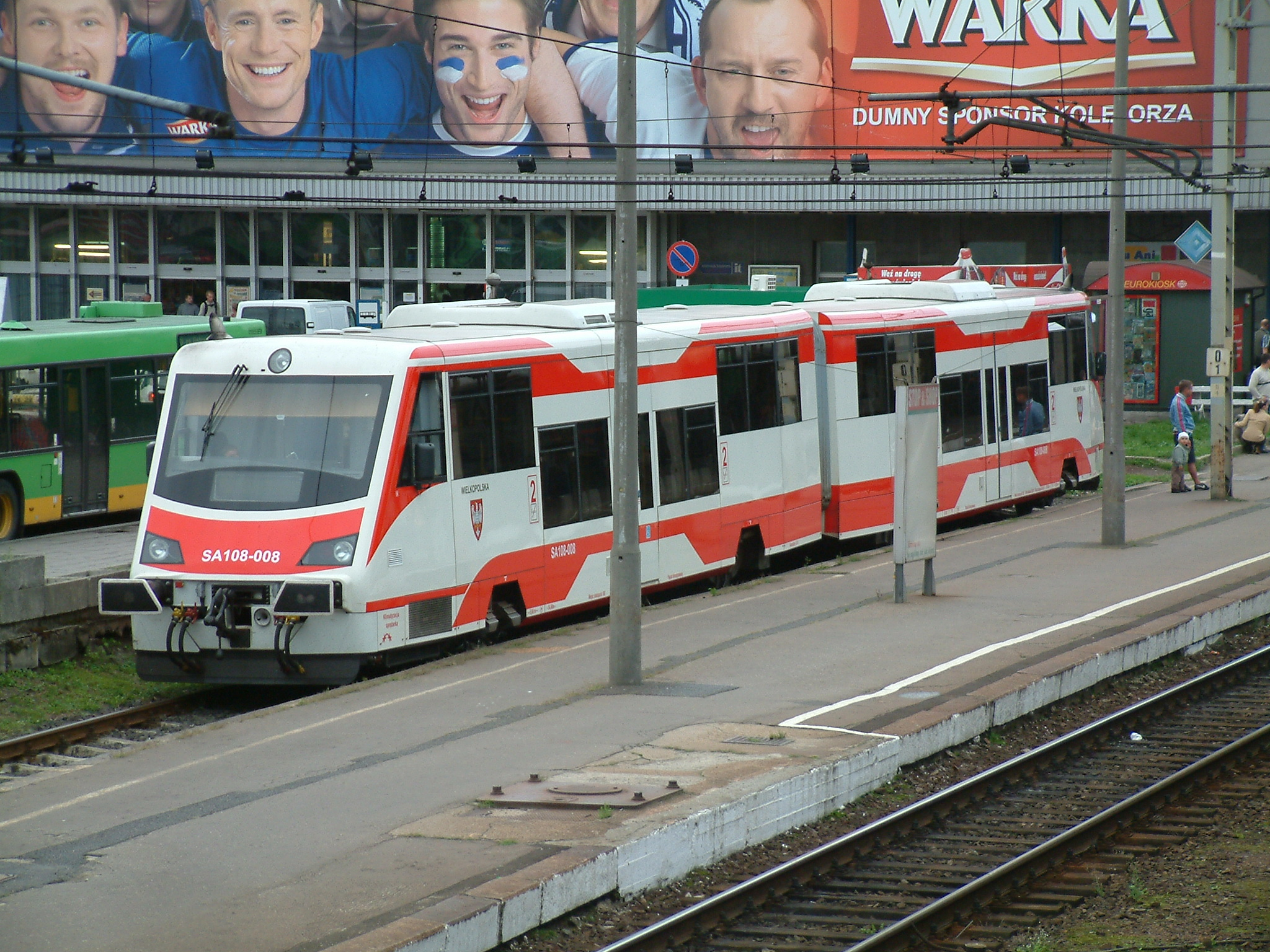
SA108 at Poznań Główny

On 1 August 2002, two 213Ms began service on the routes from Poznań to Wągrowiec and Grodzisk Wielkopolski. In November 2002, the local government of the Greater Poland Voivodeship signed a contract for the delivery of five two-unit 215M vehicles, the first of which began service in 2003 on the route from Leszno to Ostrów Wielkopolski, replacing a train set hauled by an SU45 locomotive. By the end of the year, three more 215Ms had been delivered, and the fifth unit was delivered in 2004.

In 2005, SA108-003 (type 215M) was presented at the Trako trade fair in Gdańsk's Oliwa. In 2006, SA108-008 (type 215M) was delivered, and in 2007, SA108-010, which was the last vehicle produced in the Regio Tramp family.

Until 31 May 2011, all trainsets were operated exclusively by Polregio; from 1 June, SA105-001 and SA108-001–003 and SA108-010 were transferred to Greater Poland Railways. On 12 March 2014, SA108-002 collided with a bus, resulting in one death and serious damage to the vehicle. On 13 December 2015, the Marshal's Office of the Greater Poland Voivodeship terminated the lease of SA105-001 to Greater Poland Railways and leased it to Polregio for 5 years. However, it and SA105-002 were transferred to Greater Poland Railways on 8 May 2018.

=== Lubusz Voivodeship ===
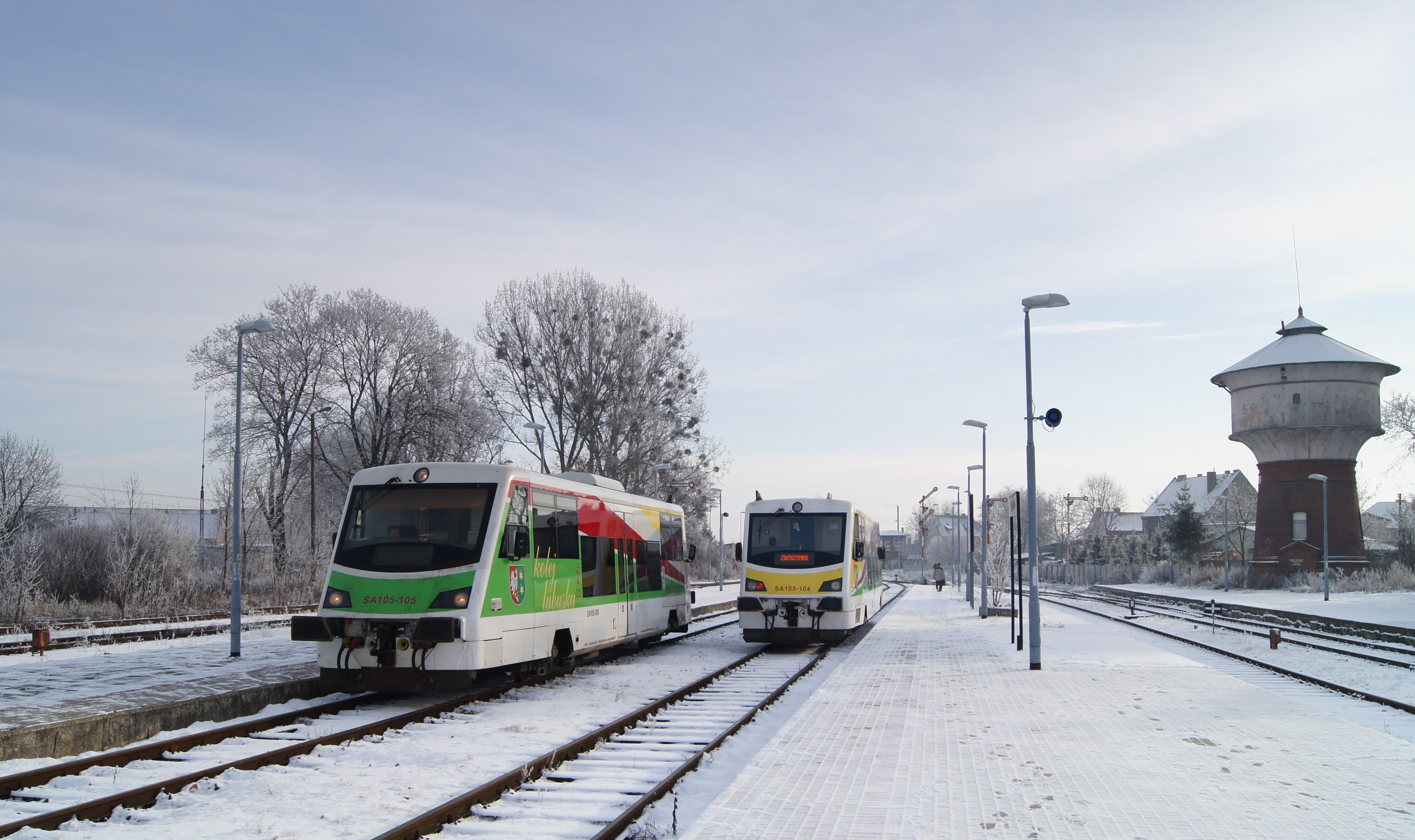
SA105 at Międzyrzecz railway station

In September 2002, the government of Lubusz Voivodeship signed a contract for the delivery of four 213Ma railbuses. On 1 September 2003, the first, SA105-101, began service on the reintroduced route between Gorzów Wielkopolski and Międzyrzecz. On 2 August 2004, the second 213Ma vehicle (SA105-102) commenced operating on the route between Zielona Góra and Żagań. In 2005, the remaining two 213Ma vehicles (SA105-104 and 105) were delivered. On 9 January 2006, the only 215M vehicle, SA108-006, came into service.

On 9 December 2007, one of the 213Ma vehicles was assigned to serve the reintroduced route between Międzyrzecz and Rzepin. At the end of 2012, two vehicles were sent for a general overhaul to Tabor Szynowy Opole. In mid-2019, the trainsets were operating the route between Gorzów Wielkopolski and Zielona Góra. The 213Ma vehicles are authorized to enter the German rail network up to Forst (Lausitz) station.

=== Podlaskie Voivodeship ===
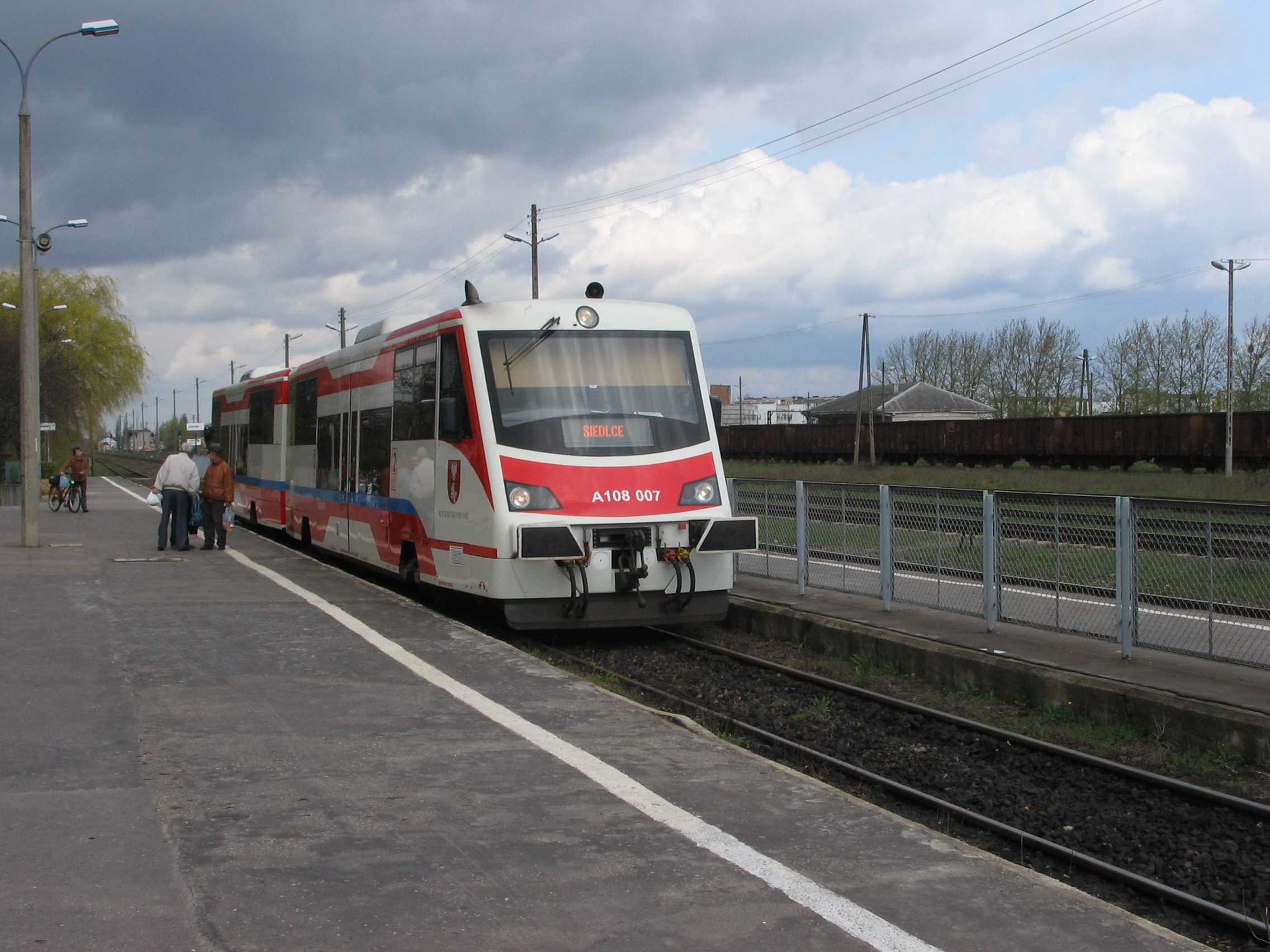
SA108 at Hajnówka railway station

On 25 November 2005, the first 215M vehicle was delivered to the Podlaskie Voivodeship, and a second one in 2006. However, these were not the first railbuses operated by the Podlasie branch of PKP Przewozy Regionalne, as SN81 units owned by PKP Przewozy Regionalne had already been in service there.

In 2007, the vehicles were used on the Białystok–Czeremcha–Siedlce route, and on the Hajnówka–Czeremcha–Siedlce route in 2008.
