= Open-air museum of the Forest Railway in Janów Lubelski =

Railway museum in Poland

Coordinates: 50.6906°N 22.4190°E

- Skansen Kolei Leśnej w Janowie Lubelskim
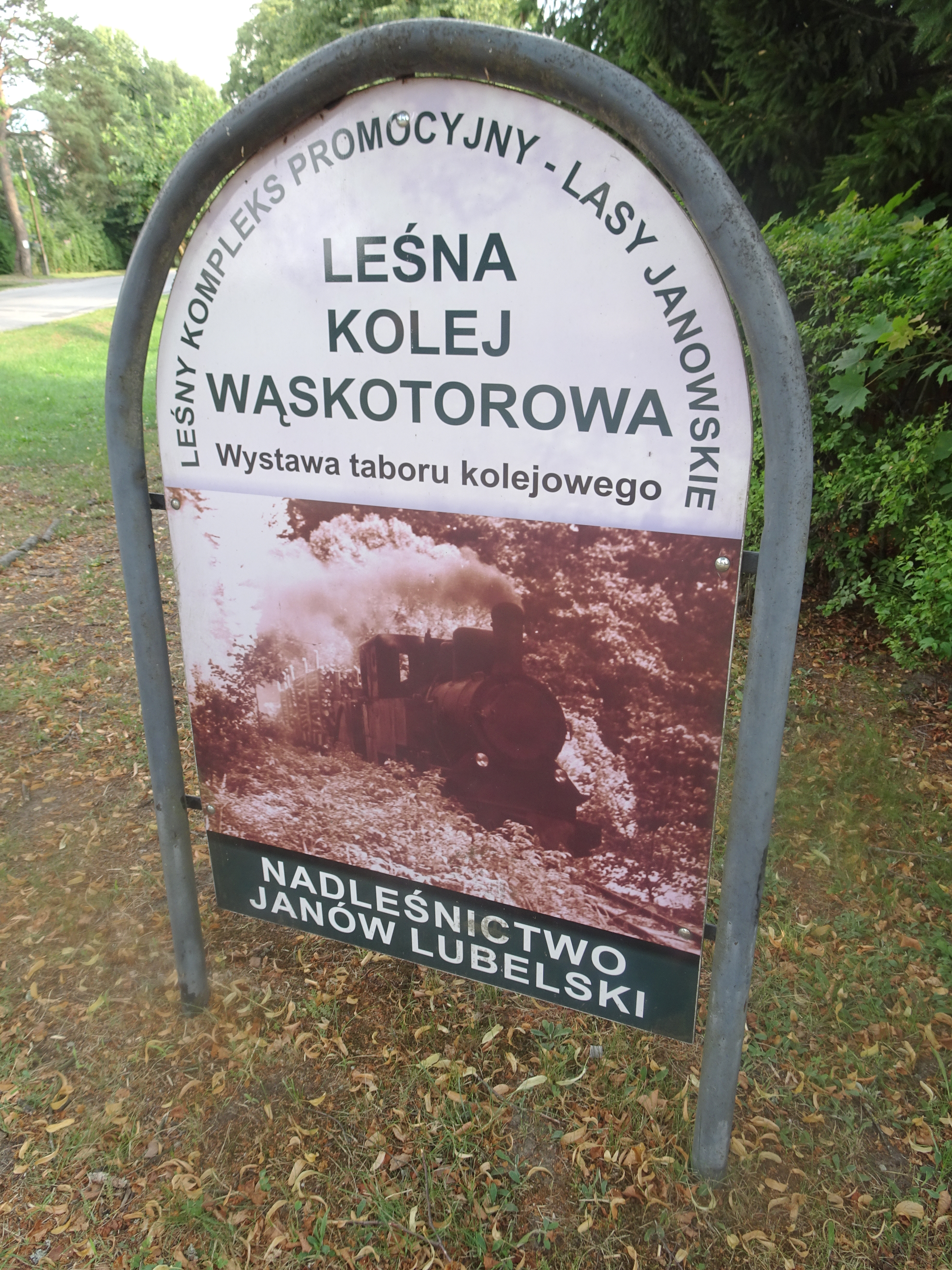

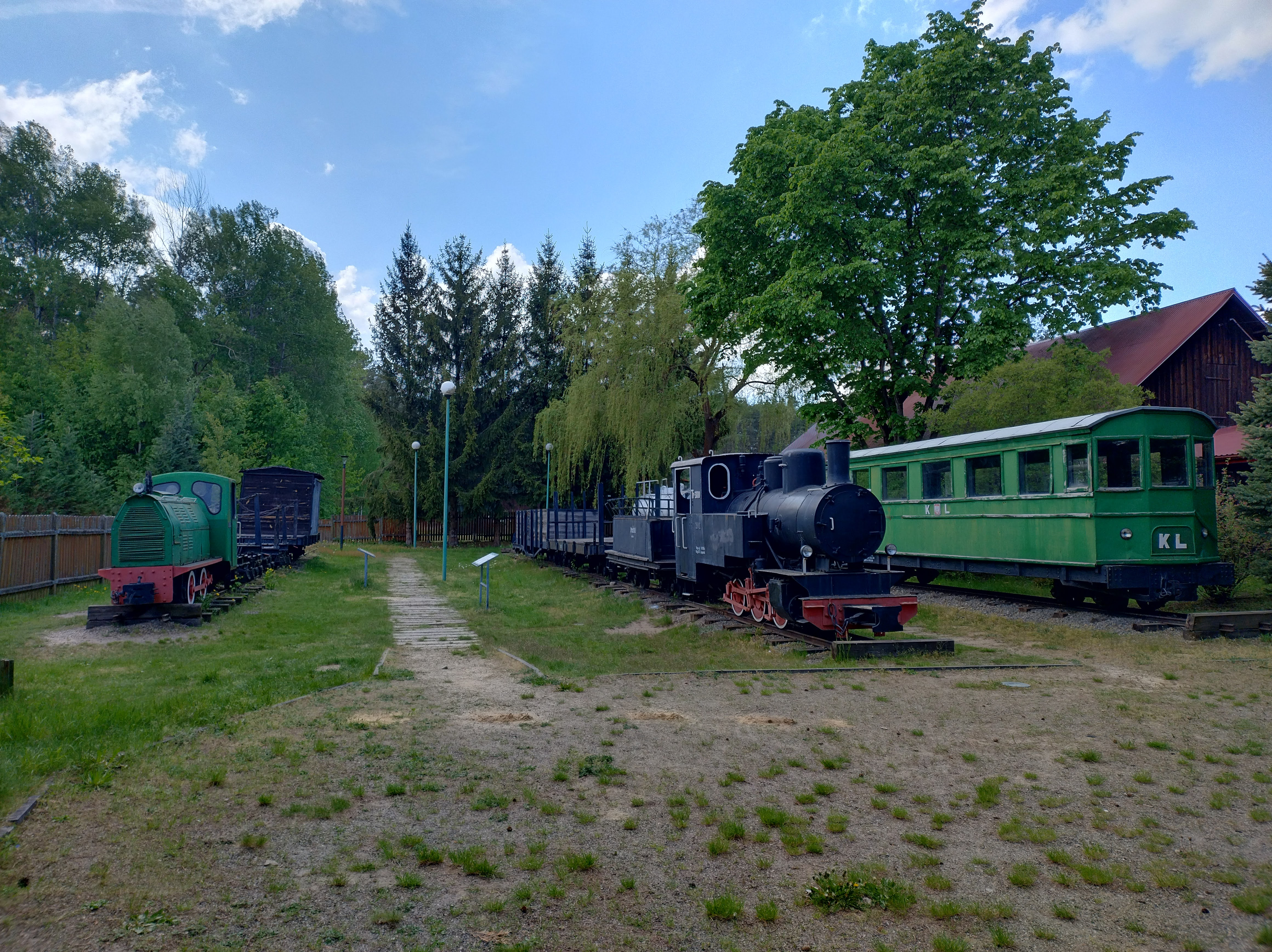
- A Fablok type Las (centre) and a WLs50 (left) on display at the museum
- Established: 2000
- Location: Lesser Poland
- Type: Open-air museum

The Open-air Museum of the Forest Railway in Janów Lubelski (Polish: Skansen Kolei Leśnej w Janowie Lubelskim) is an open-air museum of technology based in the suburbs of Janów Lubelski. The facility is operated by the local State Forests.

The facility opened in October 2000. It collects historical items related to the functioning of the Forest Railway in the Janów Forests, operating from 1941 to 1984, on the route between Biłgoraj and the village of Lipa (gauge 600 mm). The railway ceased operation in 1984 and The tracks on the last section (Lipa - Szklarnia) were dismantled in 1988. After the railway ceased to function, part of the rolling stock was exhibited in the area of the former loading space in the village of Szklarnia, where deterioration took place due to the lack of supervision. In 1999 the rolling stock was moved to Janów Lubelski, where it was renovated by the Foundation of Polish Narrow-Gauge Railways.

The open-air museum's exhibition includes a Las47 steam locomotive (no. Ty3810) and a WLs50 diesel engine (no. 2105/1970). It also had asstanchion wagons for transporting logs, a platform, passenger wagons (for transporting workers), a tender, a tanker, a platform with a snow plough and a tipper.

The museum is a year-round facility, open daily. Admission is free.
