= WLs75 =

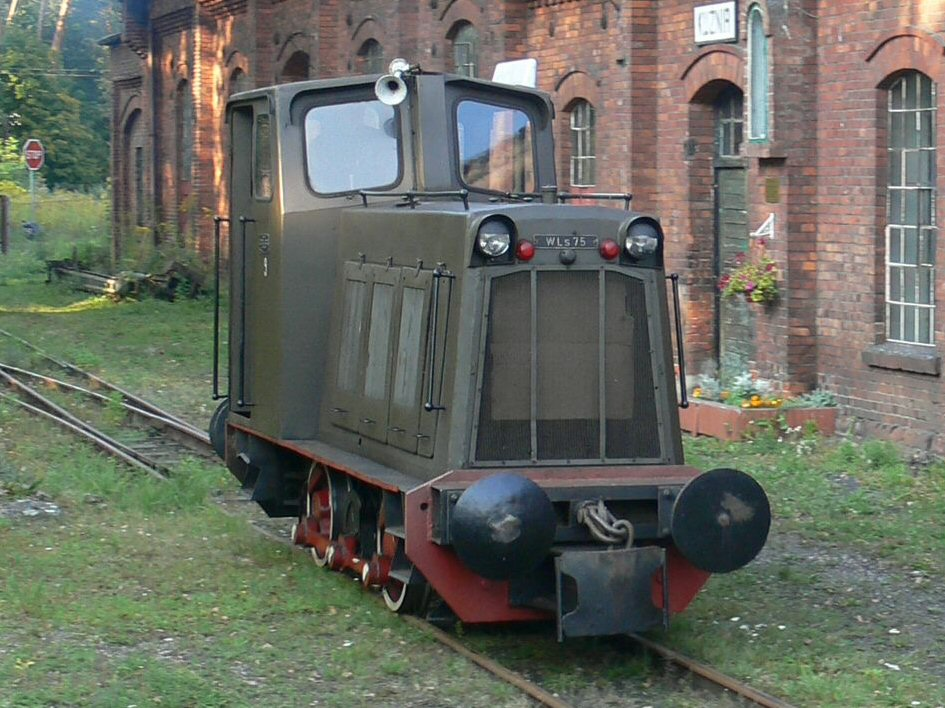
- WLs75-38 in a museal station in Rudy
Type and origin
- Power type: Diesel mechanical
- Builder: ZNTK, Poznań
- Build date: 1965 - 1975
- Total produced: 86
Specifications
- Configuration
  - Whyte: 0-4-0DM
  - UIC: B
- Gauge: 750 mm (2 ft 5 1/2 in); 785 mm (2 ft 6 29/32 in); 900 mm (2 ft 11 7/16 in)
- Driver dia.: 670 mm
- Minimum curve: 25 m
- Wheelbase: 1550 mm
- Length: 5110 mm
- Width: 1550 mm
- Height: 2650 mm
- Adhesive weight: 5 t
- Loco weight: 10 t
- Fuel capacity: 140 l
- Transmission: mechanical
Performance figures
- Maximum speed: 18.5 km/h
- Power output: 75 HP
- Tractive effort: 2400 kg
Career
- Operators: industry

The WLs75 is a small narrow gauge diesel locomotive built in Poland, at the ZNTK in Poznań. It was used mostly on industrial railways.

== History ==
The locomotive's design was started at the CBKPTK (Central Design Bureau of Railway Stock Industry) in Poznań. The design was finally made in 1961 by the ZNTK Poznań (Railway Stock Repair Works). It was powered by 75 hp diesel engine and had a mechanical transmission, driving two axles by cranks and connecting rods.

WLs75s were first built in 1965. (WLs stood for Wąskotorowa - narrow-gauge, lokomotywa - locomotive, spalinowa - internal combustion engine). In total, 86 were built with the last shipped in 1975. They were built for 750 mm (2 ft 5 1/2 in) and 785 mm (2 ft 6 29/32 in) gauge. Two locomotives were made for 900 mm (2 ft 11 7/16 in) for a park railway in Silesian Park.

The locomotives were only used in Poland. It was hoped thatthey would be acquired by Polish State Railways (PKP), but the railways found them under-powered. As a result, they were manufactured for the industry, mostly sugar works, smelters and steelworks. Two were used by the Polish Army. Production was relatively low, because most buyers preferred the cheaper 50 hp 2WLs50 locomotives.

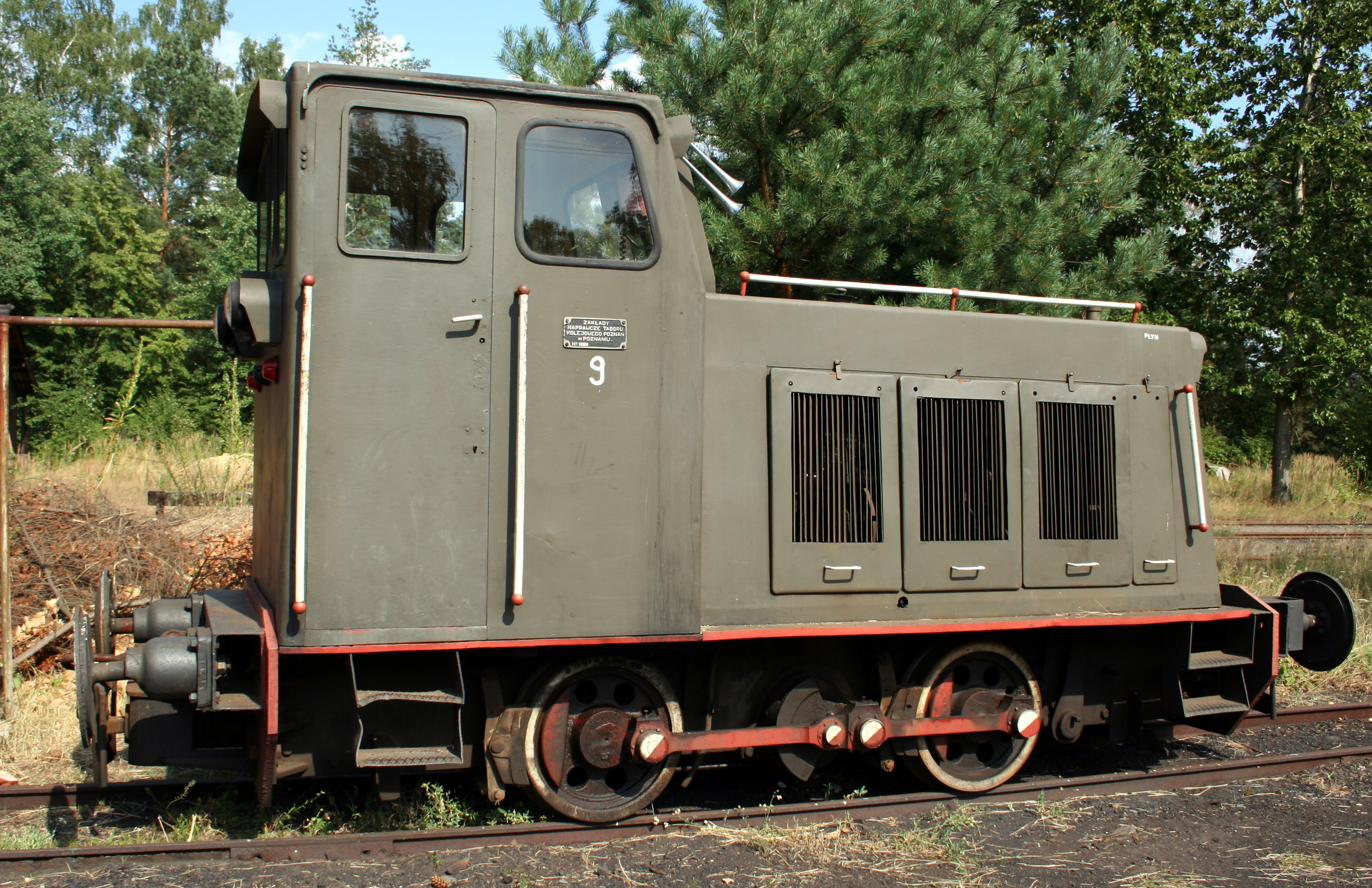
WLs75-38

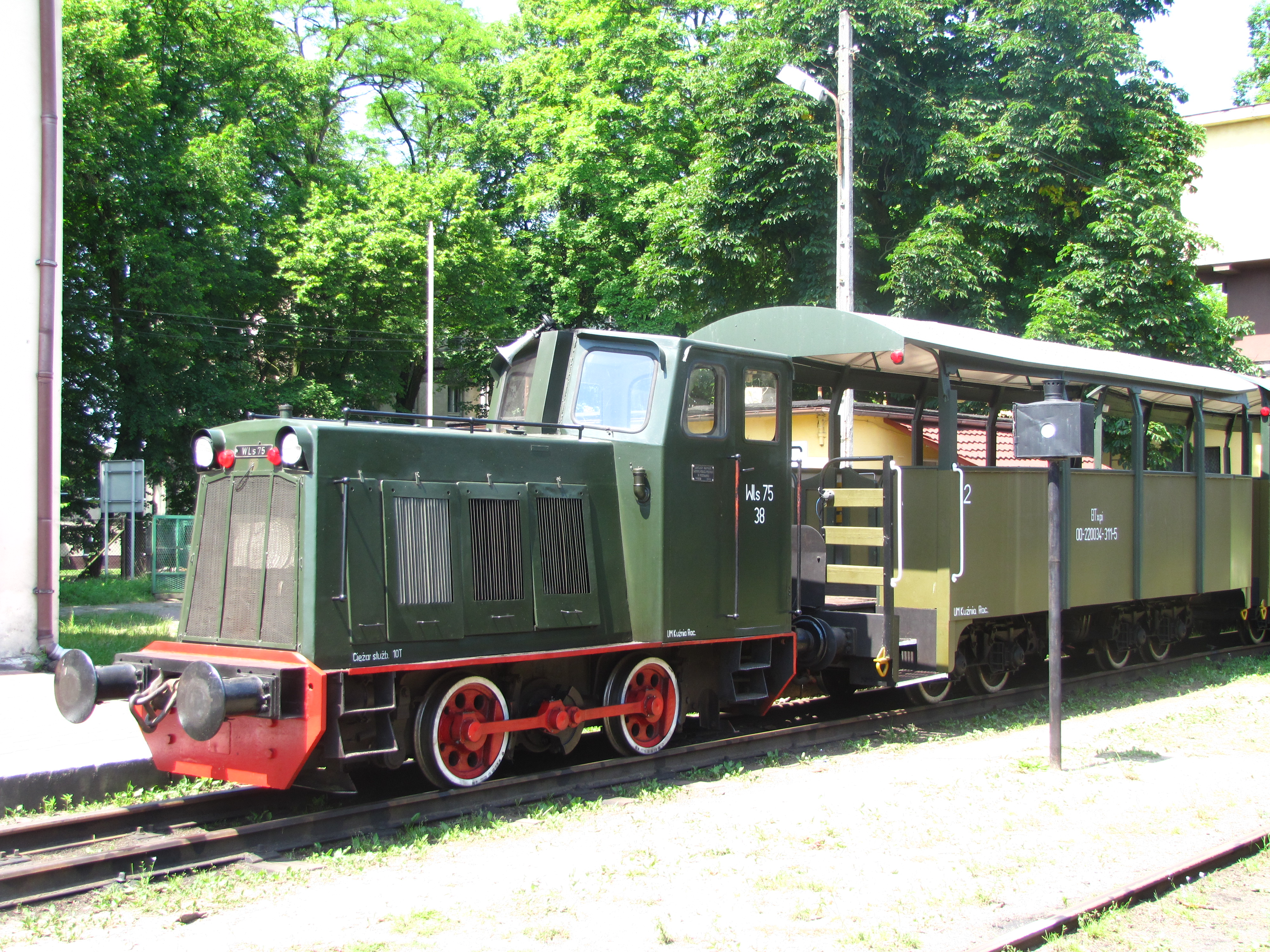
WLs75-38
