= Kolzam RegioVan =

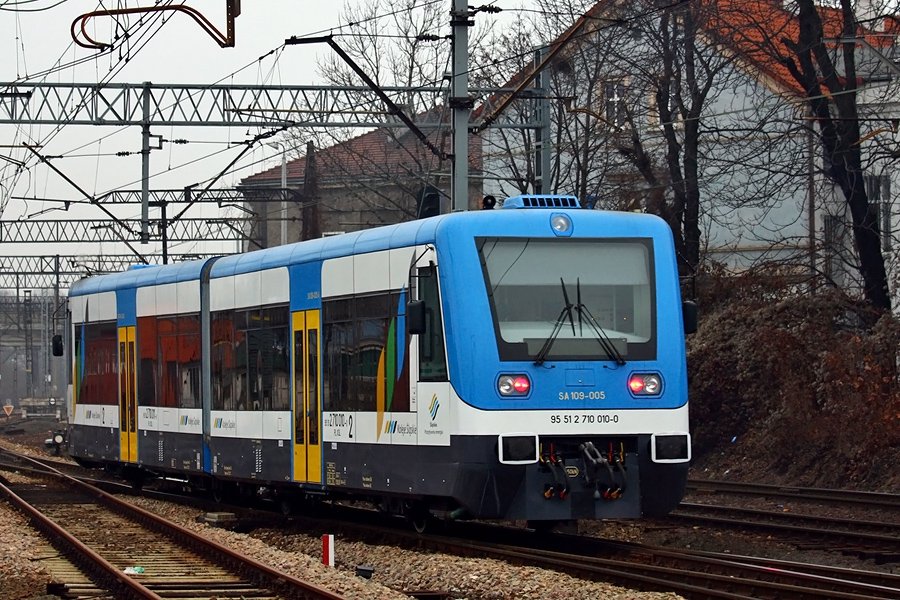
- SA109-005 of Silesian Railways
- Manufacturers: Kolzam, Fablok
- Number built: 13

Specifications
- Width: 2900 mm
- Height: 3800 mm
- Maximum speed: 120 km/h (75 mph)
- Weight: Mini 23.3 t (22.9 long tons; 25.7 short tons); Midi 45 t (44 long tons; 50 short tons); Maxi 60 t (59 long tons; 66 short tons)

Kolzam RegioVan is a series of railcars produced in Poland, produced by Kolzam in Racibórz in 2003–2005 and by Fablok in Chrzanów in between 2011 and 2012. Kolzam jointly produced: two single units (SA107 – 211M type) and 10 double units (SA109 – 212M type), the eleventh railcar was produced by Fablok. There have never been any triple units produced.

== History ==
=== Origin ===
In the 1990s, the PKP Group owned 6 railcars produced by Kolzam (SN81) and 6 by ZNTK Poznań (Class 207M).

The PKP planned a rolling stock renewal programme in the 1990s in which they were to receive the 16 ordered Pendolino ETR 460s, 50 EU11/EU43 from Bombardier Transportation Polska and a few hundred railcars for local connections. The order for the Pendolinos was cancelled in 2000 after the Supreme Audit Office identified serious shortcomings in their tender processes, and also due to the precarious financial situation PKP was in. In 2002 all of the delivered EU11 locomotives were sold to the Italian passenger transportation company Ferrovie dello Stato Italiane.

The order for the latter railcars never happened. But both Kolzam and ZNTK Poznań had drawn up plans and began a full structural project to create the railcar, and built the high-floor Kolzam 208M (SA104 and SA122) which was commercially used from 1996–2013.

By the end of 2000 after the restructure of the financing of the PKP for regional transportation, which created the Polregio which allowed the company to use finances for rolling stock. Which meant the company chose to order one, two and three unit railcars.

Together with Kolzam ZNTK Poznań built the ZNTK Poznań Regio Tramp and Pesa with the Pesa 214M.

=== Bankruptcy of Kolzam ===
After the declaration of bankruptcy by the manufacturer in August 2005, the documentation and the right to produce of the RegioVan was bought by Fablok. Kolzam itself was bought by the Hungarian company MAVEX-Record in 2007.

== Construction ==
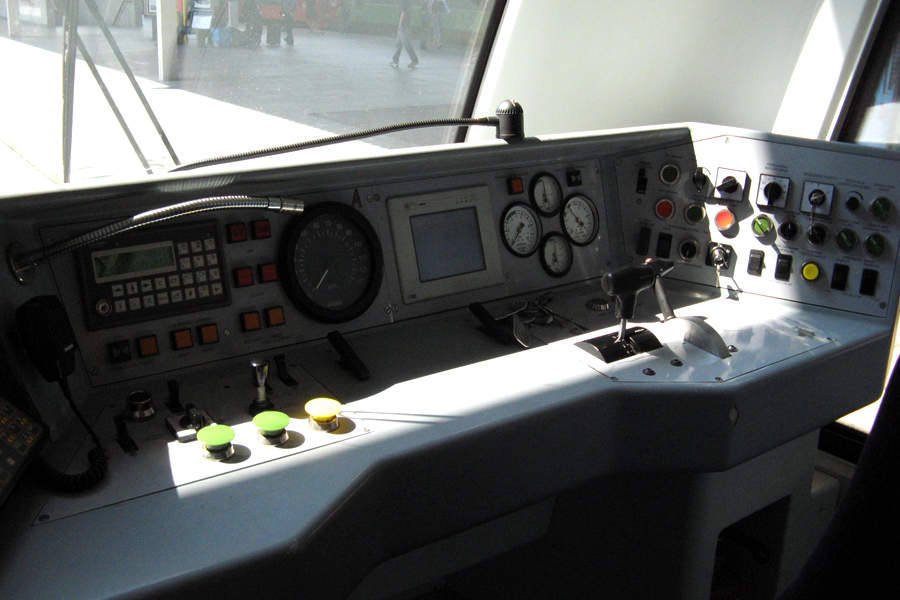
Cabin in the Kolzam RegioVan.

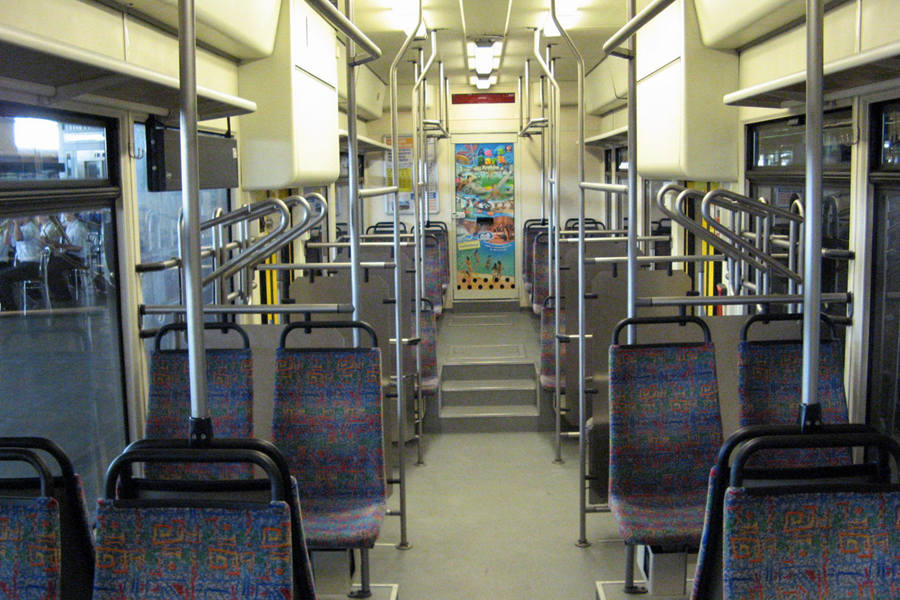
Interior of the Kolzam RegioVan.

The RegioVan is a single-level, partly low-floor railcar for regional passenger service on less busy, mostly non-electrified railway lines. Produced in single and double units. The triple unit although being a project did not become realised.

In contrast to the previous designs of the Kolzam SN81 and SA104/122, the RegioVans have a modular lightweight body structure with a low floor in the entrance area. The height of the floor in the lower level is 575–600 mm and in the partly high level with steps and a ramp the height is 1090 mm.

The units have double slide doors on both sides with a width of 1300 mm, located in the low floor area. Under each door there is a sliding step for easy boarding and access to the vehicle.

Both the 211M unit, the 212M one-axle unit (18MNb) and the (31ANb) are a one-axle unit. The planned three-axle unit, was to have had a third unit. The drive unit had an integrated engine with a power transmission and reverse shuttle which was placed under the floor in the power-pack engine system.

The units are equipped with standard safety automation equipment: automatic train braking and Radio-Stop.

=== Variants ===
Type	Name	Number of units	Axle formation	Service weight	Length	Number and power of engines	Number of seated places	Number of places	Number of units
211M	Mini	1	A'1'	23,3 t	14 645 mm	1 × 190 kW	42 / 39	84	2
212M	Midi	2	A'1'+1'A'	45 t	26 630 mm	2 × 190 kW	62+11 / 64+9	180	11
210M	Maxi	3	A'1'+1'1'+1'A'	60 t	38 350 mm	2 × 275 – 315 kW	114	270	0
