= Janów Lubelski =

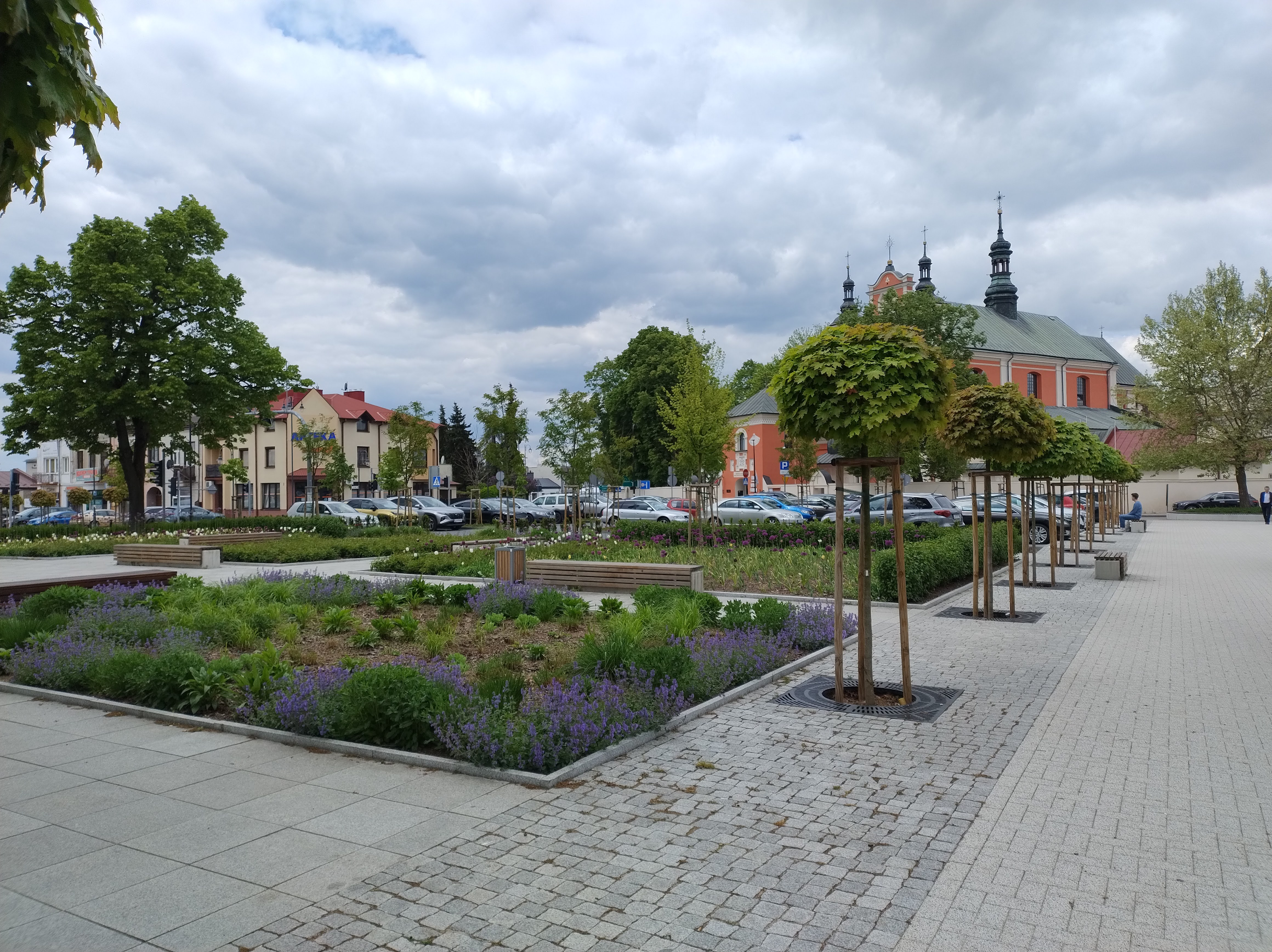
- Market Square, 2025

- Coat of arms
- Interactive map of Janów Lubelski
- Location within Poland
- Coordinates: 50°43′N 22°25′E
- Country: Poland
- Voivodeship: Lublin
- County: Janów
- Gmina: Janów Lubelski
- Town rights: 1640
- Named for: Jan Zamoyski

Government
  - Mayor: Krzysztof Adam Kołtyś (PiS)

Area
  - Total: 14.84 km^{2} (5.73 sq mi)

Population (2013)
  - Total: 12,092
  - Density: 814.8/km^{2} (2,110/sq mi)
- Time zone: UTC+1 (CET)
  - Summer (DST): UTC+2 (CEST)
- Postal code: 23-300
- Vehicle registration: LJA
- Car plates: LJA
- Website: www.janowlubelski.pl

Janów Lubelski [ˈjanuf luˈbɛlskʲi] is a town in southeastern Poland. It has 11,938 inhabitants (2006). Historically part of Lesser Poland, it is presently situated in the Lublin Voivodeship and is the capital of Janów County. The town lies on the edge of a hilly region called Roztocze, on the Białka River, and its area is approximately 14.80 square kilometers. South of Janów there is the extensive Solska Forest. It is also home to the Open-air museum of the Forest Railway.

The town is located at the intersection of two national roads: the 19th (Rzeszów – Lublin – Białystok – Grodno), and the 74th (Hrubieszów – Zamość – Kraśnik – Kielce – Piotrków Trybunalski). The distance to Lublin is 70 kilometers, and to Rzeszów, 90 kilometers.

== History ==
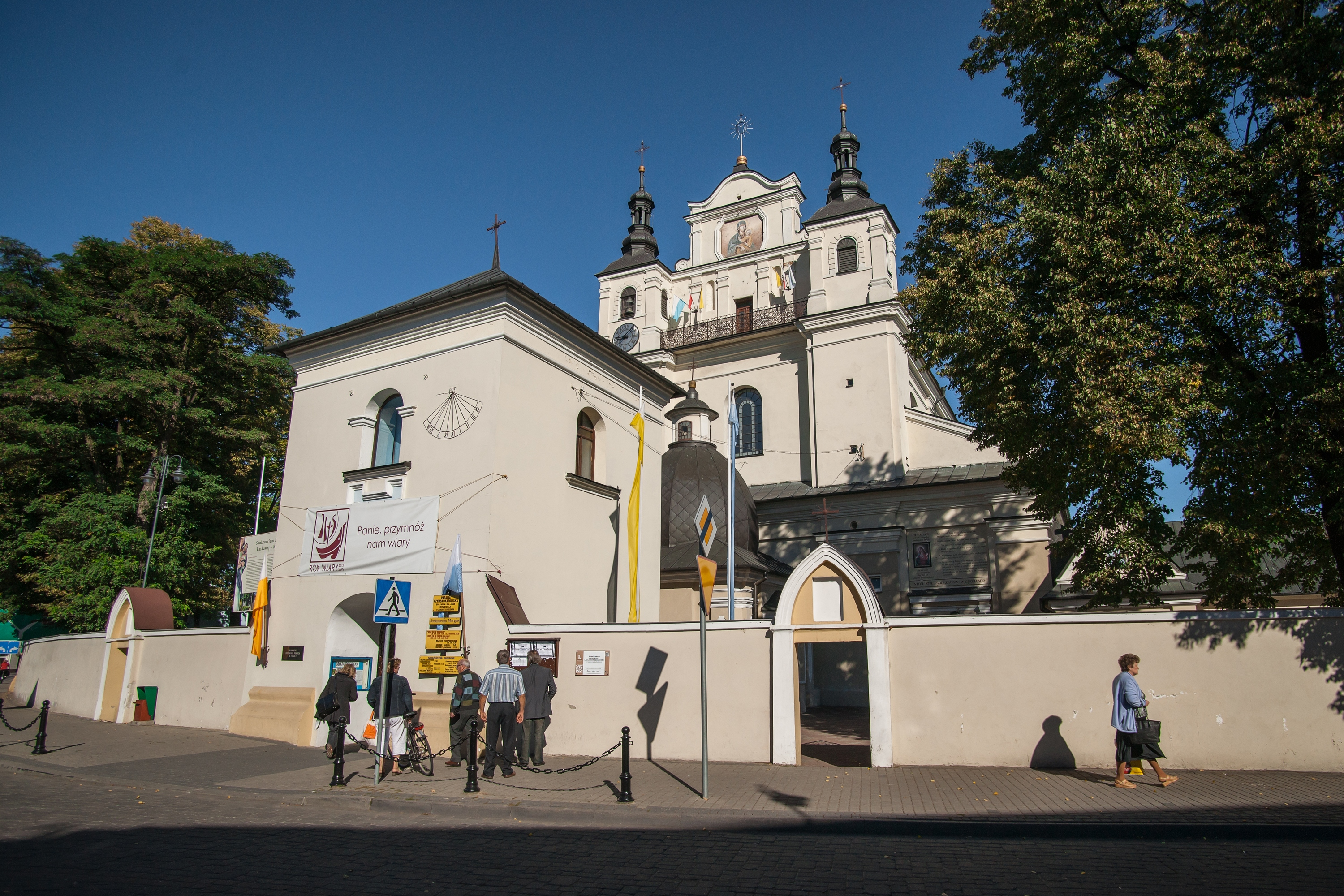
Baroque Saint John's Catholic Church

The history of Janów Lubelski dates back to the 12th century, when first human settlements appeared in Sandomierz Forest. Over time, the number of villages grew, and a busy merchant road was constructed from Zamość to Sandomierz. In the first half of the 17th century, local noblewoman Katarzyna Zamoyska (see: Zamoyski family) decided to found a town along the road. On July 21, 1640, King Władysław IV Vasa issued a royal privilege, agreeing to found the town of Biała with Magdeburg Rights. The coat of arms of the new town presented Saint Mary, and to build houses, the area located southwest of the Biała river was chosen. The name Janów appeared a few years later. It comes from the first name Jan (John), and commemorates Jan Zamoyski, the son of Katarzyna Zamoyska. In a similar fashion, the towns of Klemensów (now a district of Szczebrzeszyn) and Tomaszów Lubelski were named.

In 1648 Janów was captured and burned by the Cossacks of Bohdan Khmelnytsky. Four years later, the population was decimated by diseases. As a result, Jan Zamoyski, who wanted to rebuild Janów, allowed the first Jewish settlers in the town (1652). In 1653, Tatars loyal to Poland came to Janów and decided to settle here as well. In 1660, Dominicans were invited to Janów, to a church and a monastery which had been funded by the Zamoyski family. The boundaries of the town were soon extended, and in the late 17th century, Janów had ca. 1,000 residents, with several artisans. After the Third Partition of Poland (1795), Janów was annexed by Austria. In 1807 it was regained by Poles and included within the short-lived Polish Duchy of Warsaw, and after its dissolution, in 1815, it was transferred to Russian-controlled Congress Poland. At that time it had some 2,000 residents, and in 1804, a great fire destroyed 71 houses. The number of residents declined, so the Zamoyski family decided to bring cloth makers from Silesia, who settled in a district called Sukiennia. After the November Uprising, the border between Austria and the Russian Empire was closed, which resulted in the collapse of cloth-making enterprises.

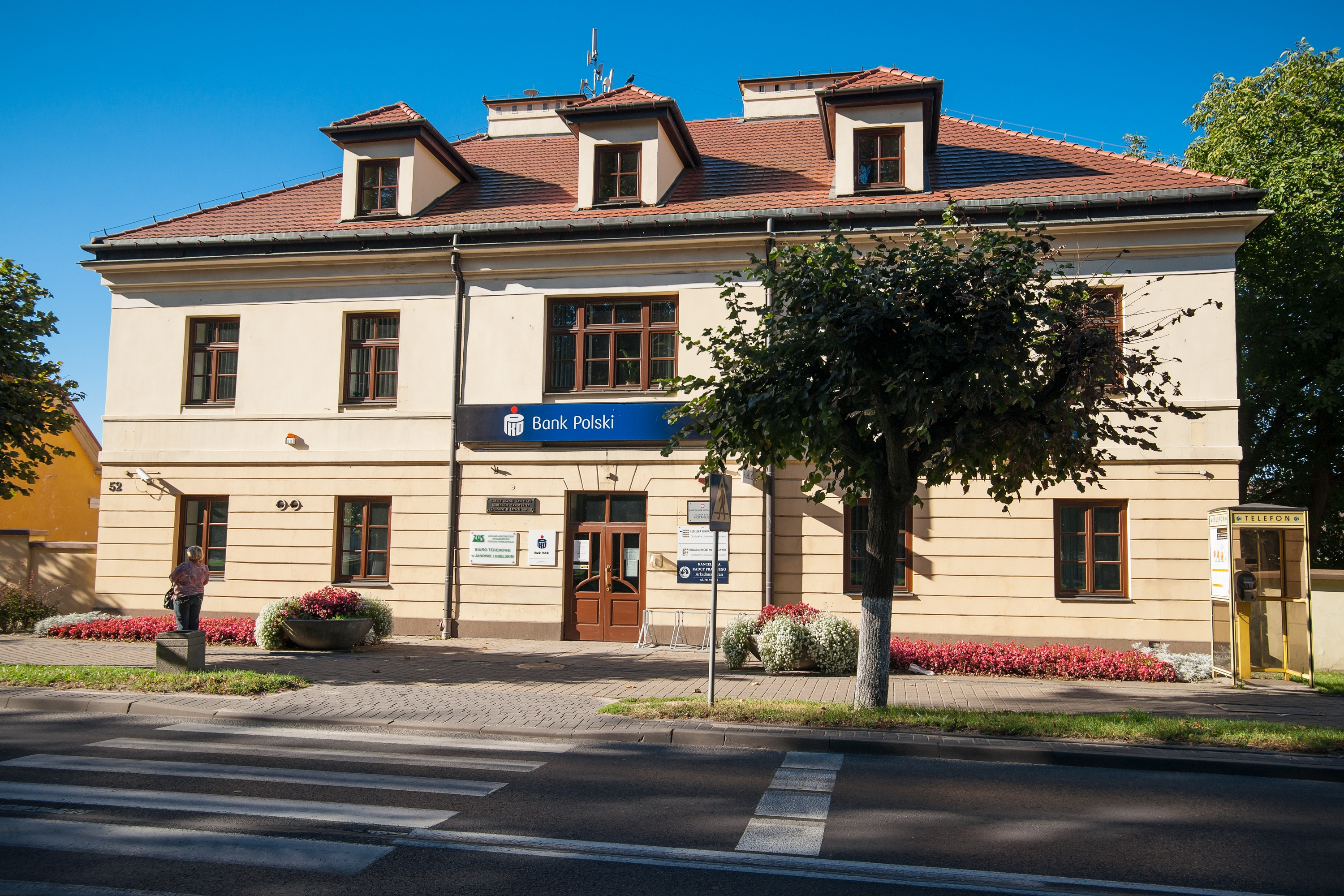
Former Zamoyski chancellery (1818-1823)

In the early 19th century, Russian authorities created Zamość County, with the capital in Zamość. Soon afterwards, however, Grand Duke Constantine Pavlovich of Russia demanded that Zamość should remain a militarized city (see Zamość Fortress), and civilian authorities (police, courts, criminal prison) moved between 1817 and 1827 to Janów. Due to this fact, the town quickly grew; the so-called New Town was founded, and in 1820, a municipal park was opened. In 1834 Janów was divided into three parts: Stare Miasto (Old Town), Nowe Miasto (New Town), and Przedmieście Zaolszynie (The Suburb of Zaolszynie). In 1841, an Eastern Orthodox church was built for Russian troops stationed in Janów, and by the mid-19th century, the population grew to 3,500. In 1860, Janów had 2 hotels, a pharmacy, 4 inns, a school, a number of cloth-making enterprises, and 12 public houses. Main streets and the market square were paved; there was a hospital (1867) and a tannery. After the January Uprising, many residents of the town and the county were sent to katorga in Siberia, and the Dominican monastery was appropriated by Russian authorities.

Historical population
Year	Pop.	±%
1921	6,426	—
1931	7,067	+10.0%
2010	11,904	+68.4%

At the beginning of the 20th century Janów had 8,000 inhabitants. During World War I, the town was the area of heavy fighting, and in 1922, after Poland had regained independence, almost half of houses burned in a fire. Janów began to grow after 1925, when additional streets were paved, 7 bridges were built, and a middle school was completed. In 1934 it had two saw mills, a mill, a brewery, and a slaughterhouse. A local power plant provided electricity, there were 339 artisans, a hospital, a senior citizen center and several civic organizations, such as Riflemen's Association.

During the joint German-Soviet invasion of Poland, which started World War II, in September 1939, Janów was three times bombed by the Luftwaffe, which killed 350 people and destroyed 85% of the town. The town was afterwards occupied by Germany. At least 17 Poles from the county were murdered by the Russians in the large Katyn massacre in April–May 1940, while in June 1940, the Germans carried out mass arrests of local Poles during the AB-Aktion. Arrested Poles were imprisoned in Lublin, and then often deported to the Sachsenhausen and Auschwitz concentration camps, while some were murdered during large massacres of Poles committed in Rury, Lublin. A forced labour camp was opened in 1940, and the town's Jewish population was persecuted by the occupiers. Several Jewish partisan groups operated in the Janów forests for the duration of the war. Despite this, only around 20 Jews from the town survived the Holocaust out of 3,500 to 5,000 Jews who lived in the town before the war.

Soviet and Polish troops captured Janów on July 26, 1944, and afterwards the town was restored to Poland, although with a Soviet-installed communist regime, which remained in power until the Fall of Communism in the 1980s. In April 1945, units of the Home Army attacked the local prison, freeing resistance fighters from Warsaw, who were kept there. Near Janów, the Battle of Porytowe Wzgórze took place.

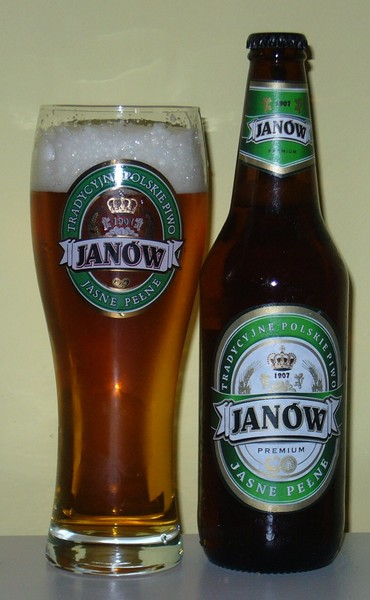
Beer from the local brewery

In 1956 Janów County was re-created, and in the 1960s the town grew, due to several new factories built there. The number of inhabitants grew, new districts were created, a new hospital was opened, as well as kindergartens, post office, and a municipal stadium.

From 1975 to 1998, Janów belonged to Tarnobrzeg Voivodeship.

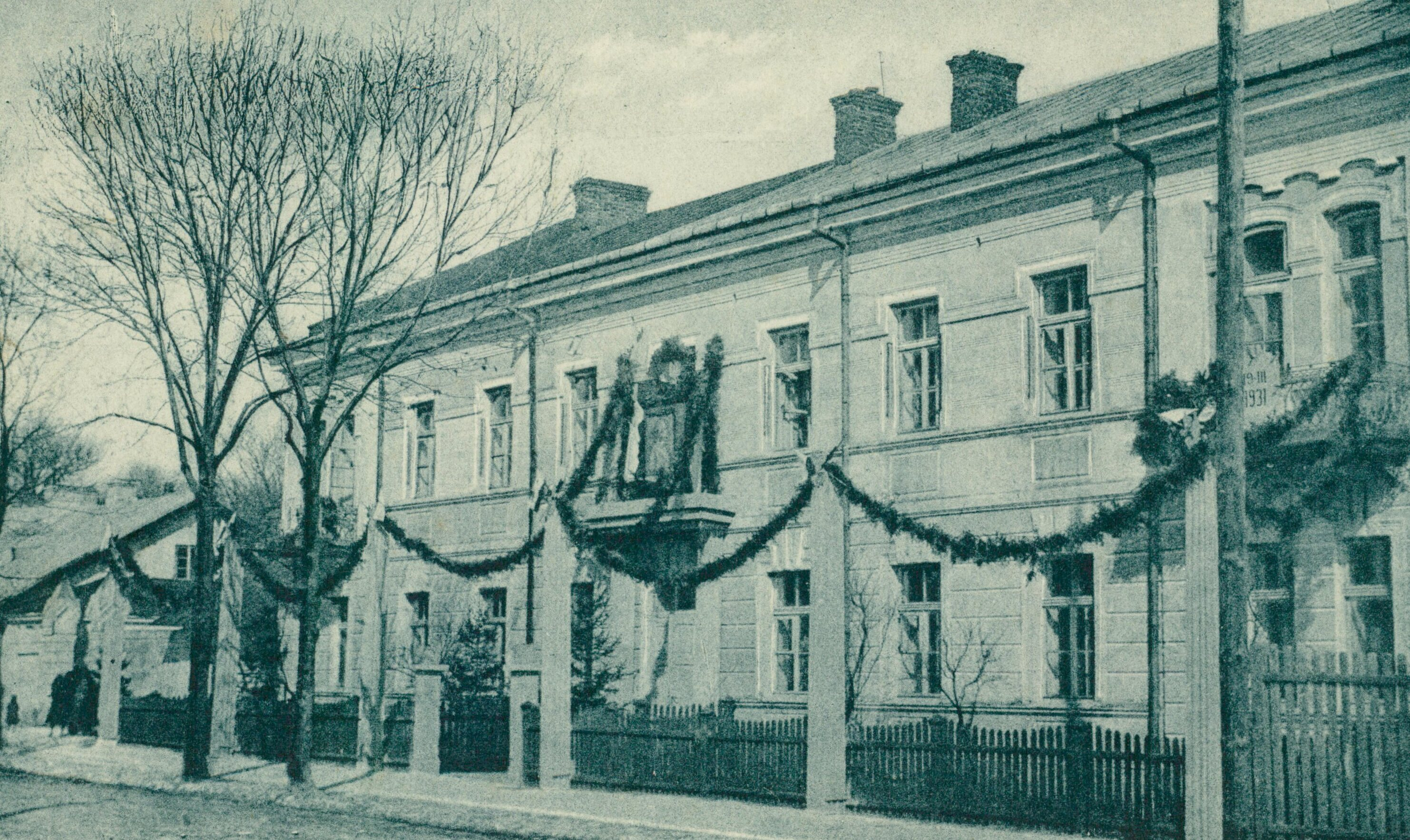
County Administration, 1932

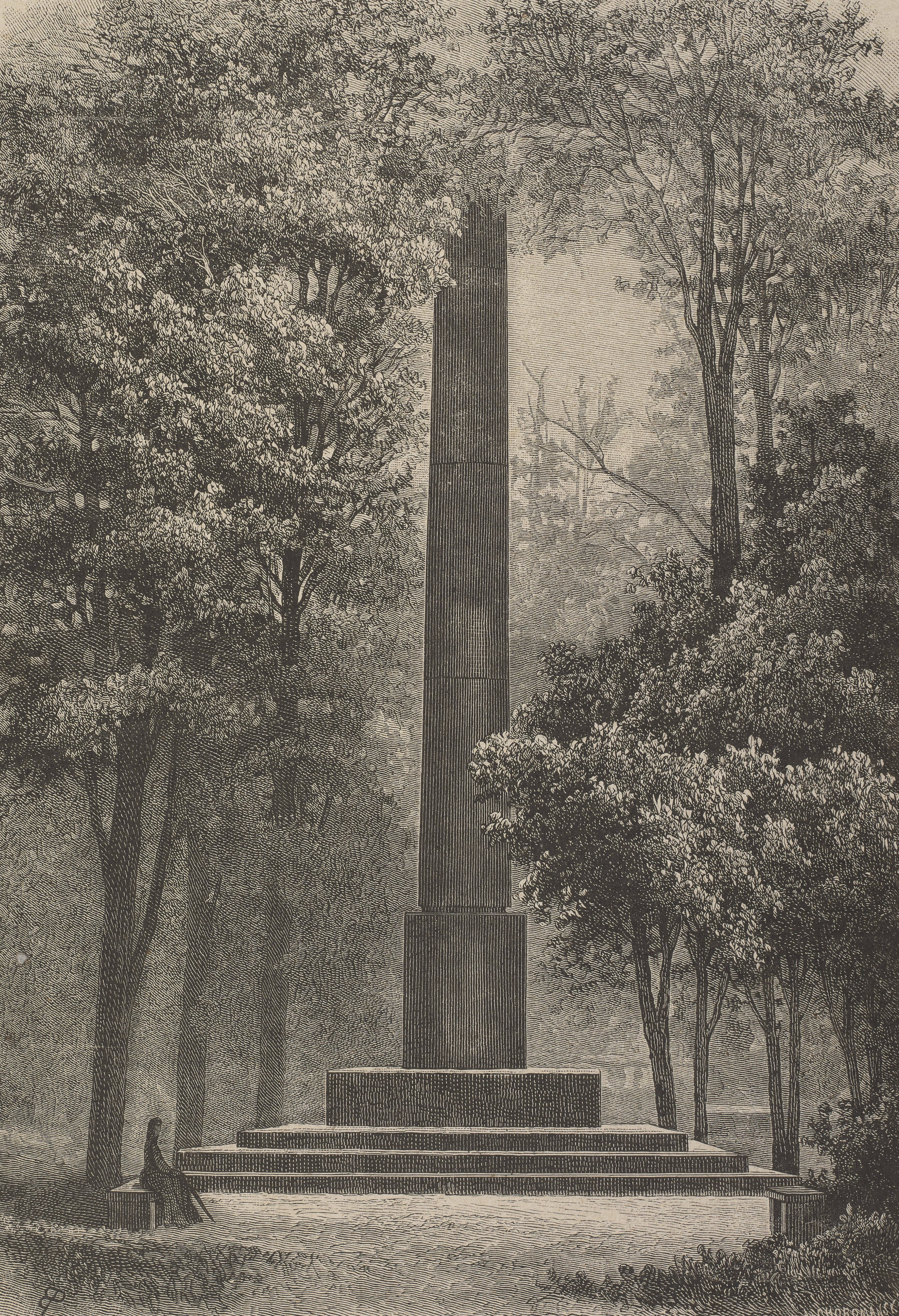
Tadeusz Kościuszko monument, 1880

== Sights and culture ==
Janów is home to two local museums and the Baroque Saint Mary of Rosary Sanctuary, located in the former Dominican monastery (1694–1769). The world's oldest monument dedicated to Tadeusz Kościuszko, dating back to 1818, is located in the town. The town is surrounded by forests.

=== Cuisine ===
Janów Lubelski with its surroundings is known for its traditional foods and drinks, often based on honey, buckwheat, cereals and potatoes, traditionally grown and produced in the region. Among those foods and drinks are gryczak janowski, buckwheat honey and honey nalewka, all of which are protected traditional regional foods, as designated by the Ministry of Agriculture and Rural Development of Poland.

Gryczak janowski is a traditional local cake made of buckwheat and millet kasza with cheese and smetana. It is served hot or cold, and is considered a dish of high nutritional, medicinal and dietetic values.

Buckwheat honey is popular throughout the Lublin Region, including Janów Lubelski. Rich in magnesium, iron, vitamin C and protein, it is used to treat a wide range of diseases.

Janowska nalewka miodowa (honey nalewka of Janów) is a local type of nalewka, a traditional Polish alcoholic drink. It is of 50% alcohol by volume.

== Economy ==
The Browar Janów Lubelski brewery is located in the town.
