= Kolzam =

Kolzam S.A.
- Industry: Rail vehicle manufacturer
- Founded: 1858
- Headquarters: Racibórz, Poland
- Total assets: 750.000,00 zł
- Website: mavex-rekord.pl

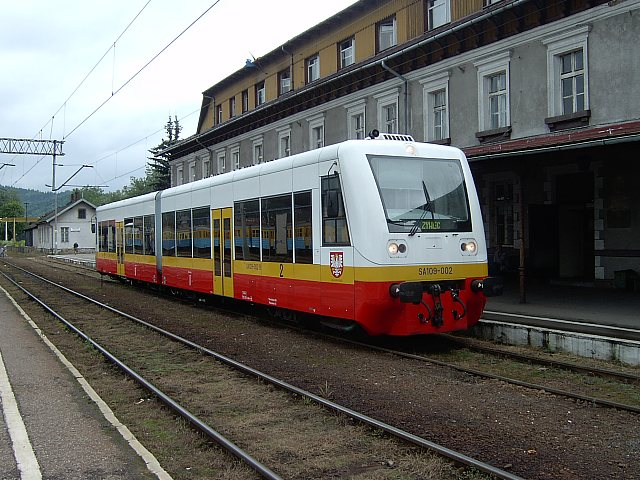
Railcar Kolzam Regiovan.

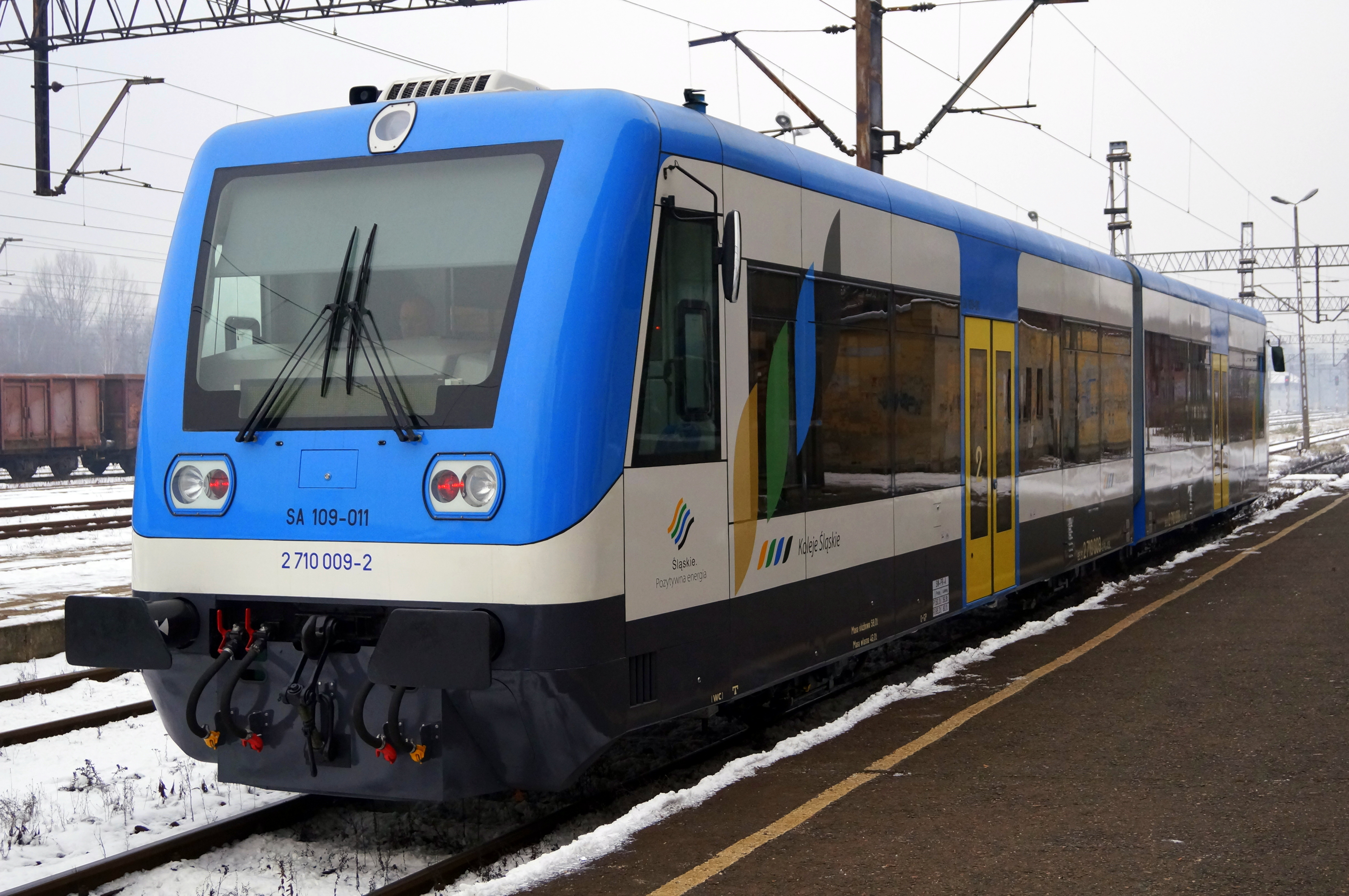
Kolzam SA109 part of Koleje Śląskie.

Kolzam is a Polish company, based in Racibórz, specialising in the production, maintenance, and modernisation of railway rolling stock. The company's products include the Kolzam RegioVan, SPA-66, 208M, electric multiple units; and has been producing railway maintenance vehicles including the Kolzam MS-W-01. Currently, the company is part of Mavex Record, which is a Hungarian company specialising in railway vehicles and components.

== History ==
Kolzam was part of the Zakłady Naprawcze Taboru Kolejowego, which was a network of railway factories in Poland, which was based close by to the Racibórz railway station in 1858. From 1895 the factory was taken over by the Directory of Railway in Katowice. After the Second World War, the company introduced sheet metal, forging, welding and machinery repair to their products. In 1973 the company introduced machinery for railways and rolling stock, and in 1984 the company had produced mini buses and railcars. The products have been exported across Europe and Asia.

== Products ==
The most popular company products:

- Diesel draisine WM-10 and the modified versions.
- Micro railcar MS-W-01.
- Railcars:
  - SN81
  - SA104
  - RegioVan
    - SA107
    - SA109.
