= Poznańskie Zakłady Naprawcze Taboru Kolejowego =

Company in Poznań, Poland

- Type: Private
- Founded: 1870
- Headquarters: 4 Robocza Street; Poznań, Poland
- Key people: President: Janusz Koczorowski
- Total equity: 3,197,780 PLN

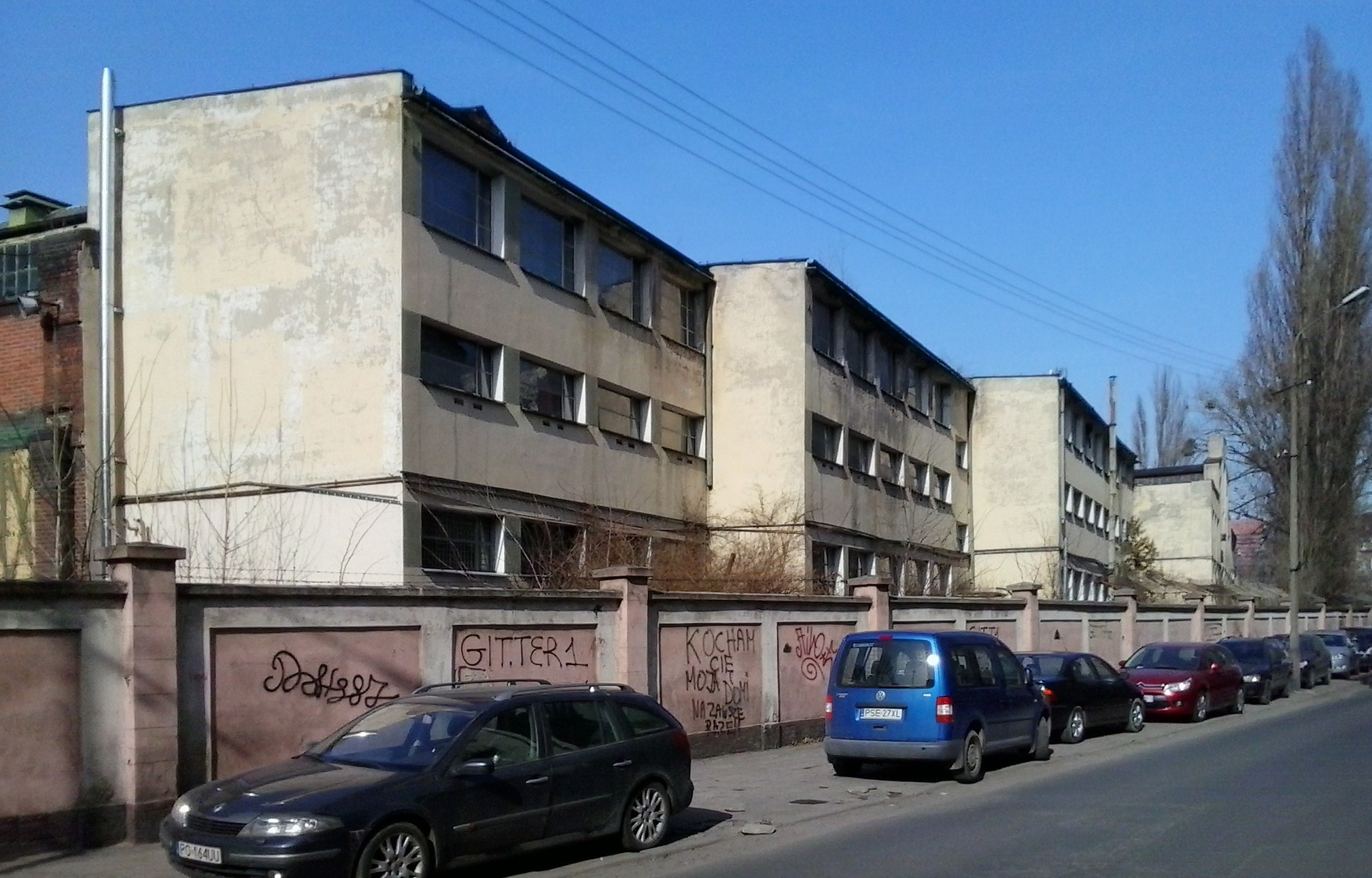
ZNTK Poznań buildings at Robocza Street

Poznańskie Zakłady Naprawcze Taboru Kolejowego (abbreviated ZNTK Poznań, English: Poznań Rail Rolling Stock Repair Workshops) is a company in Poznań engaged in the production, modernization, and repair of railway vehicles and their components, as well as providing other services in the railway industry. Its origins date back to 1870, when the first of three railway workshops was established, which were merged into a single facility in the late 1880s and early 1890s. During the Polish People's Republic, it operated as a state-owned enterprise, the Rail Rolling Stock Repair Workshops in Poznań. In 1995, it was transformed into a joint-stock company, and in 2005, it was acquired by the Sigma company. Since 2018, it has been in bankruptcy.

== History ==
=== Origins and early operations (1870–1920) ===
The history of the workshops dates back to 1870. In that year, the Marchian-Poznań Railway Company established the first railway workshops. In 1872 and 1873, the Upper Silesian Railway Company opened additional workshops to repair rolling stock for its Poznań-Bydgoszcz-Toruń Railway, and in 1875, further workshops were opened by the Poznań-Kluczbork Railway Company. None of these facilities performed major repairs, and after the construction of Poznań Główny railway station in 1879 for all lines converging in Poznań, these workshops were located in its immediate vicinity.

In 1885, all railways converging in the city came under the state administration of the Kingdom of Prussia, and shortly thereafter, the Poznań railway workshops were organizationally merged and transformed into main workshops, subordinate from 1895 to the Poznań Railway Directorate. They were named Königlich-Preußische Eisenbahn-Hauptwerkstätte Posen (English: Royal Prussian Railway Main Workshops Poznań).

In the years following the merger, the workshops began to expand. In 1908 and 1913, the most intensive modernization of technical equipment took place. New halls for repairing steam locomotives and wagons, a copper forge, a boiler room, and workshops for sheet metal work, machine tool repairs, and apprentice training were built. After the expansion, the workshops performed major repairs of steam locomotives, passenger, and freight wagons.

=== Acquisition by the Polish State Railways and World War II (1920–1945) ===
In 1920, the workshops were taken over by Polish State Railways and renamed PKP – Main Steam Locomotive and Wagon Workshops in Poznań. At that time, they occupied an area of about 200,000 m², with approximately 50,000 m² dedicated to buildings. They were equipped with 459 repair stations, including 73 for steam locomotives, 16 for locomotive tenders, 118 for passenger and covered freight wagons, 240 for open freight wagons, and 12 in the paint shop. The workshops did not specialize in repairing steam locomotive boilers, so a temporary workshop was initially organized, and between 1923 and 1924, a new hall with an area of 6,120 m² and 40 repair stations was built. In 1927, the workshops adopted the name PKP – First-Class Main Workshops in Poznań, and by 1928, their expansion was completed, during which halls with a total area of 14,000 m² were constructed.

During World War II, the workshops were named Reichsbahn-Ausbesserungswerk Posen and continued their pre-war activities. The workforce then numbered about 4,000, of which 90% were Poles. In 1944, British and American forces bombed the workshops, which were 40% destroyed. The freight wagon repair hall and the old steam locomotive repair hall were completely destroyed. During the enemy's retreat, most machine tools and other equipment were stolen.

=== State-owned enterprise period (1945–1995) ===
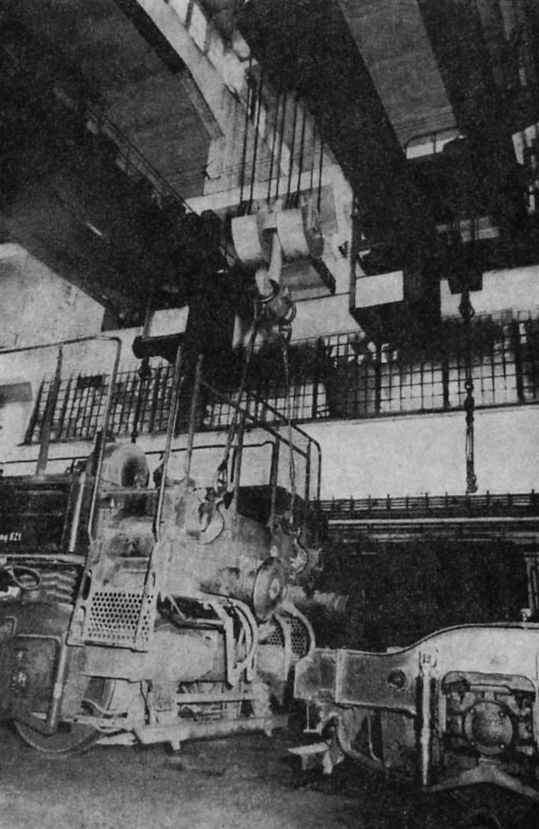
Diesel rolling stock repair in the workshop halls

On 12 February 1945, the workshops resumed repair activities for the Polish State Railways rolling stock under their pre-war name, and over the next two years, they were rebuilt. The workshops then operated as a state-owned enterprise. In 1950, they were renamed State Railways Mechanical Workshops No. 12 in Poznań, and in 1951, Steam Locomotive and Wagon Repair Works No. 12 in Poznań. In the same year, freight wagon repairs were discontinued, and in the following year, serial production of narrow-gauge diesel locomotives began, leading to another name change to Rail Rolling Stock Repair Workshops in Poznań (abbreviated ZNTK Poznań). In 1957, ZNTK underwent expansion, increasing its repair capacity fivefold compared to the pre-war period, and from 1961, it became a leading center for diesel rolling stock repairs. In 1966, the last steam locomotive was repaired, and in 1968, repairs of diesel locomotives with power below 600 hp ceased. At that time, production of wheels and gear transmissions for diesel rolling stock, as well as spare parts for diesel locomotive engines from Hungarian, Romanian, and Soviet production, and Hungarian diesel wagons used by the Polish State Railways, was launched. Between 1970 and 1990, the workshop's name was supplemented with in the name of the Second Polish Army. In 1980, employment exceeded 4,400 people. In 1991, ZNTK Poznań began building railbuses.

=== Joint-stock company (from 1995) ===
On 1 February 1995, following the transformation of the state-owned enterprise, ZNTK Poznań became a sole-shareholder company of the State Treasury named Poznań Rail Rolling Stock Repair Workshops.

Railbuses produced by the company were problematic to service, which, combined with the deteriorating financial situation, led to bankruptcy. In May 2005, employees, who had last received wages for February 2005, began a strike, delaying the delivery of two vehicles then being produced for Lubusz Voivodeship and two for Podlaskie Voivodeship. In mid-July 2005, the company's management signed a preliminary agreement to sell 11% of shares to the Lubin-based Sigma company. Sigma also purchased 25% of state-owned shares. Sigma subsequently acquired a majority stake and took over ZNTK later that year. Despite the change in ownership, the company's situation did not improve. Due to delays in paying employee wages, the works lost the ability to participate in tenders. Their offerings were expanded to include modernizations of used railway vehicles and locomotive construction. In December 2005, ZNTK presented a project for a modernized locomotive ET42M, which was to be produced in cooperation with Electric Locomotive Production Works in Tbilisi.

In 2009, ZNTK employed 400 people. In February 2010, unpaid employees announced another strike. Over the next two years, strikes recurred, and in May 2012, former employees reached a settlement with the company, avoiding lawsuits. In spring 2014, plans were made to announce an architectural-urban planning competition for the redevelopment of ZNTK's land. Ultimately, these lands were put up for sale in November 2014 but did not change ownership.

The financial situation of the workshops continued to deteriorate. In 2017, enforcement proceedings led by a bailiff were discontinued due to the company's insolvency. On 16 October 2018, the court declared ZNTK Poznań bankrupt.

== Operations ==
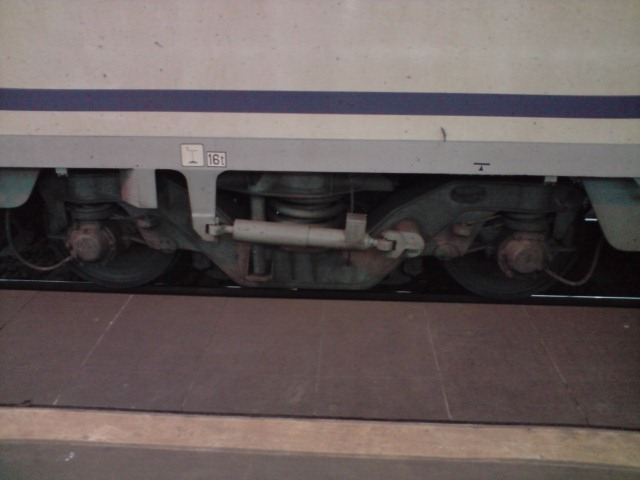
Bogie from the 25AN family

ZNTK Poznań's offerings in 2012 included:

- Production of railbuses from the ZNTK Poznań Regio Tramp family.
- Modernizations of locomotives from series SM42, ST43, ST44, SP32, and BR232.
- Scheduled, major, and emergency repairs of locomotives from the above series, as well as SU45, SU46, SM48, 401Da, S200, EU07, ET22, and 182.
- Production and repair of bogies from the 25AN/S family for passenger cars, and 4RS/N, 6RS/N, and 7RS/N for freight cars. Also production of brake discs for these bogies.
- Production of components for the automatic gauge-changing system SUW 2000.
- Repair of wheelsets and electric machines.
- Metal forming and mechanical processing.
- Rental of office, warehouse, and production spaces.

=== Rolling stock overview ===
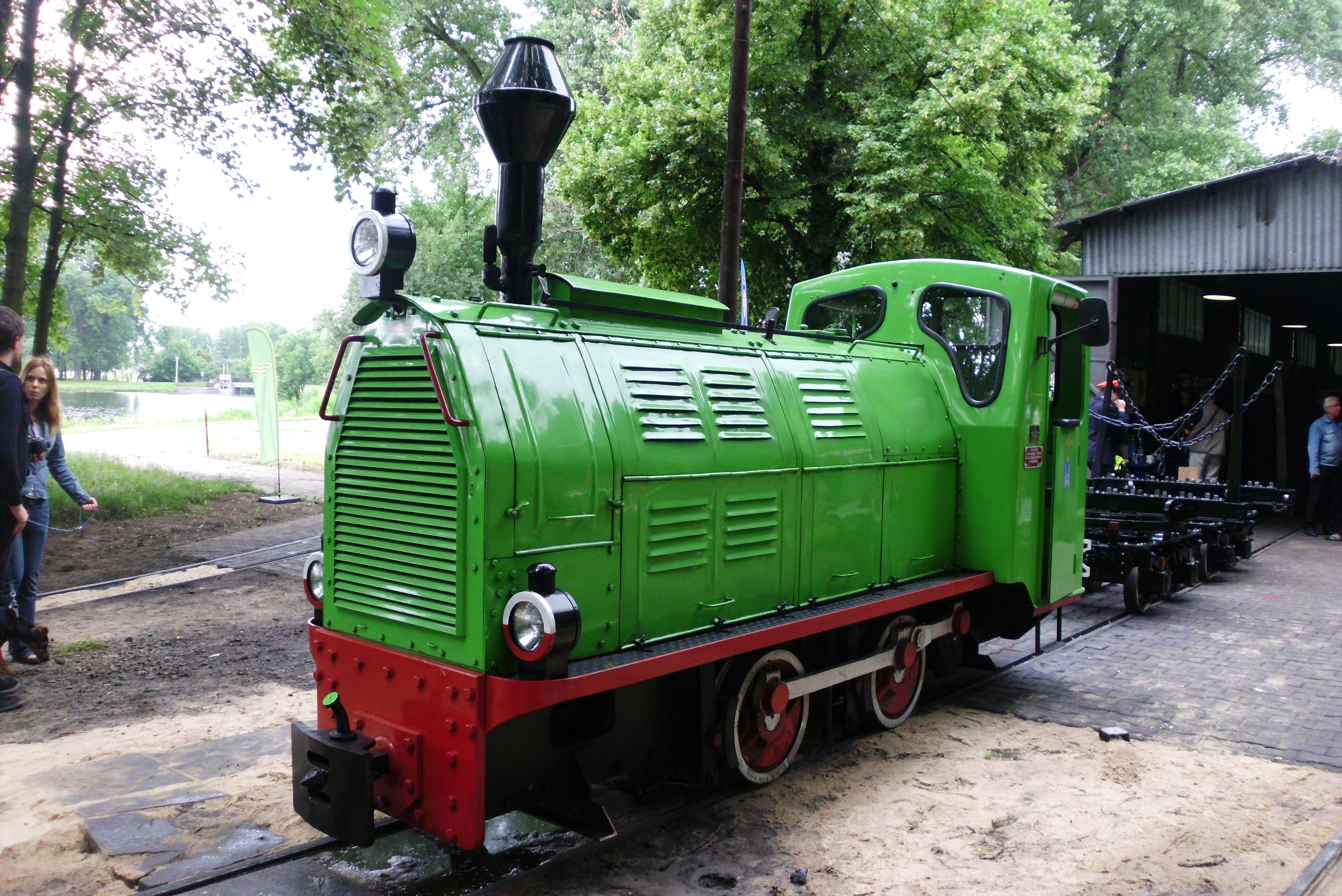
Narrow-gauge locomotive type WLs40

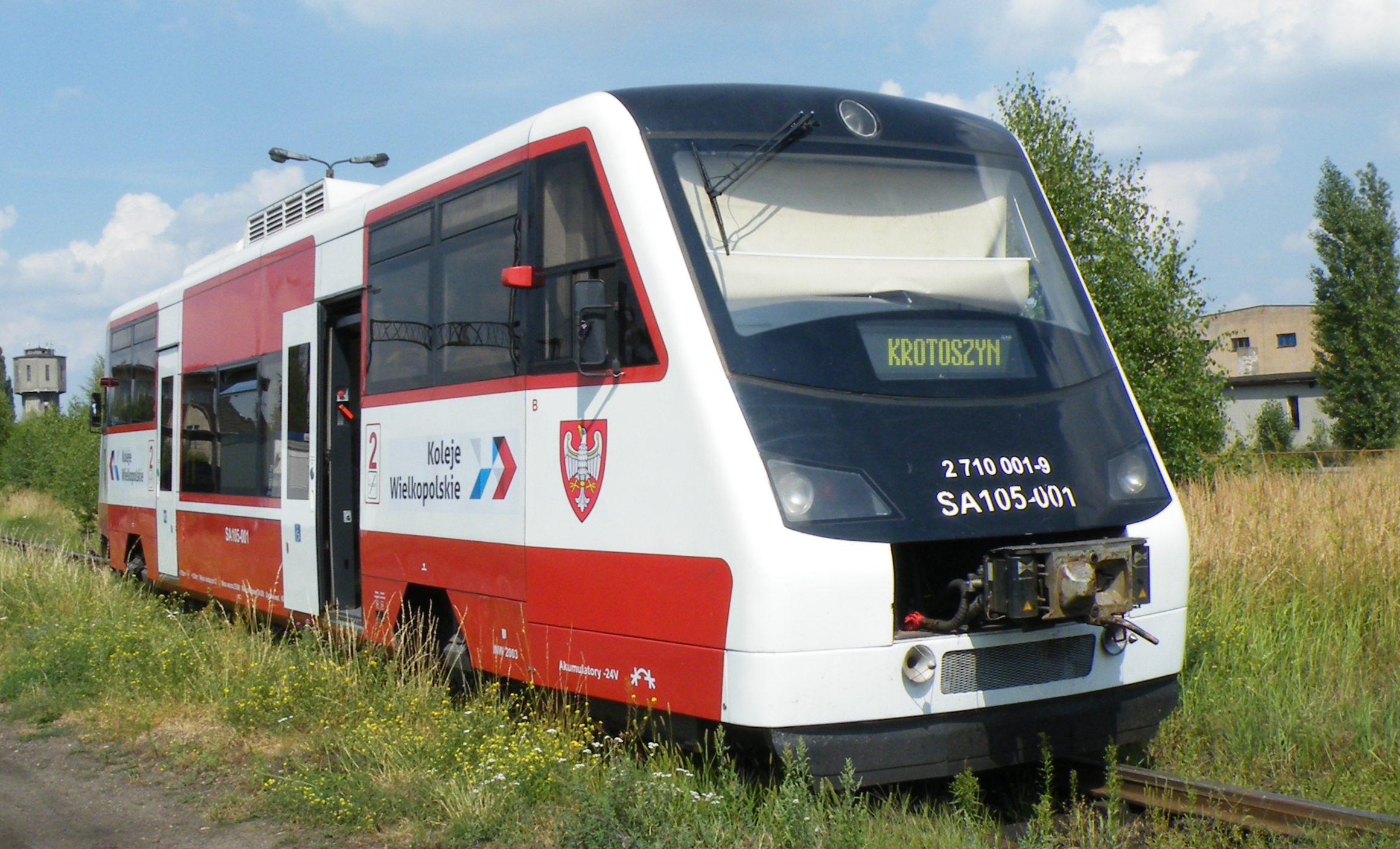
Representative of the Regio Tramp family

Type	Series	Vehicle type	Production years	Number of units	Sources
WLs40	Ld1	Narrow-gauge diesel locomotive	1952–1960	882	
2WLs40	–	Narrow-gauge diesel locomotive	1954–1960	47	
WLs50	Ld1	Narrow-gauge diesel locomotive	1961–1975	1090	
2WLs50	–	Narrow-gauge diesel locomotive	1964–1975	153	
WLs75	–	Narrow-gauge diesel locomotive	1965–1975	86	
–	SR61	Diesel measurement railcar	1985	1	
207M+207Mr	SA101+SA121	Railbus	1991–1992	3	
207Ma+207Mra+207Mb	SA102A+SA111+SA22B	Railbus	1993–1996	3	
ZNTK Poznań Regio Tramp	ZNTK Poznań Regio Tramp	Railbus	2002	2	
ZNTK Poznań Regio Tramp	SA104	Railbus	2003–2005	5	
ZNTK Poznań Regio Tramp	SA108	Railbus	2003–2007	10	
DH1	SN82	Diesel railcar	2009	1	
DH2	SN83	Diesel multiple unit	2009	3	

== Awards and honors ==
- 1999 – First prize in the Ernest Malinowski competition at the Trako 1999 fair for the bogie type 25ANa.
- 2007 – Distinction in the Ernest Malinowski competition at the Trako 2007 fair for the bogie type 6RS/N with variable gauge 1,435/1,520 mm.
