= Class 207M =

Polish train

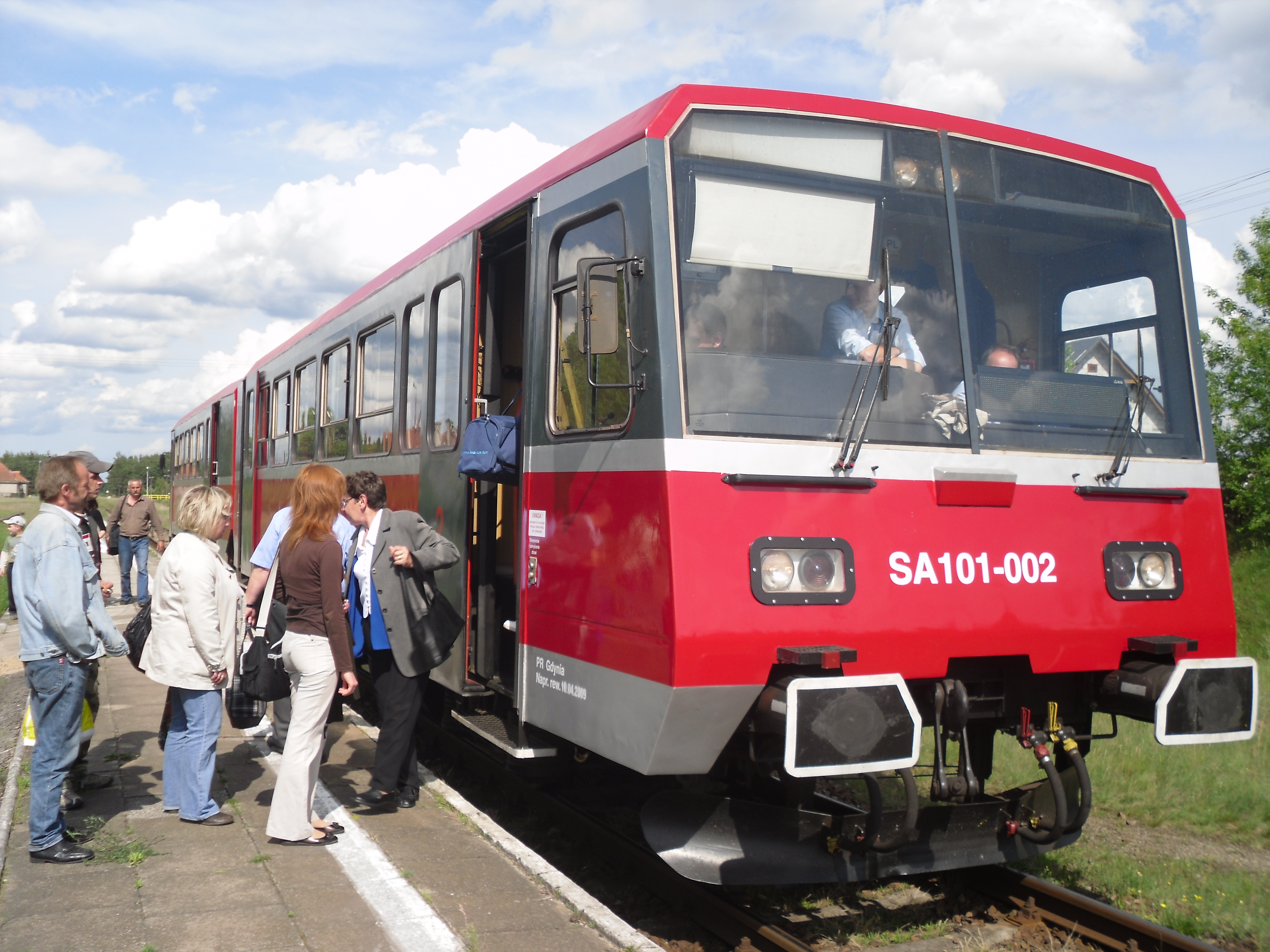
SA101

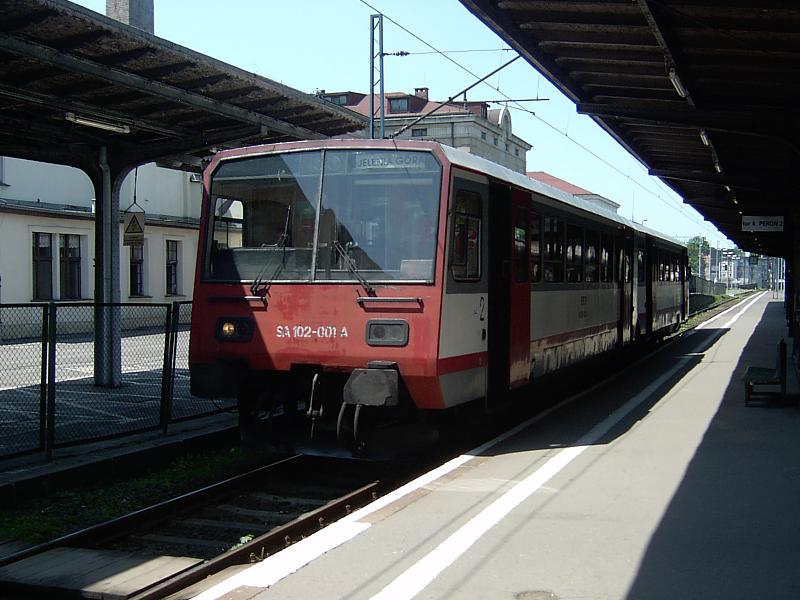
SA102

Class 207M is a prototype series of Polish light Diesel Multiple Units (a.k.a. railcars). Only six were made in following configurations:

- two cars - a set of 207M power car and 207Mr trailer-control car (PKP designation SA101+SA121)
- three cars - a set of: 207Ma power car, 207Mra trailer car, 207Mb power car (PKP designation SA102+SA111+SA102)

== History ==
By the end of the 1970s, steam traction in Poland was mostly retired. Non-electrified lines became operated with diesel locomotives. For short distance passenger traffic (mainly suburban trains) PKP was seeking a more economical solution than a heavy diesel locomotive pulling few cars. The obvious solution was the use of railcars. However, due to politics-related economical problems Poland was facing in 1980s, it wasn't until 1990 that the first cars were produced.

The class 207M was developed in ZNTK Poznań by a team led by Polish renowned rail transport engineer Ryszard Suwalski. The concept prospected trains from one up to four cars in consist. Only 2- and 3-car versions were made, three of each. Again, due to economical difficulties class 207M never went into serious production. After 2001 a larger contingent of railcars/DMUs went into production and they were based on newer projects than 207M. The last class 207M unit was retired in 2017.

== Technical data ==
	207M	207Mr	207Ma	207Mb	207Mra
PKP designation	SA101	SA121	SA102 (A)	SA102 (B)	SA111
year of production	1990–1992		1993–1996		
motor type	Deutz BF6L513RC 200 kW	—	Deutz BF6L513RC 200 kW		—
axle configuration	1'A	1'1'	1'A		1'1'
maximum speed	90 km/h				
