= Zakłady Naprawcze Taboru Kolejowego =

Network of rolling stock maintenance and construction factories in Poland

Zakłady Naprawcze Taboru Kolejowego (ZNTK, English: Rail Rolling Stock Repair Workshops) were a network of rolling stock maintenance and construction factories in Poland. It was formed during the 1950 reorganization of the state-owned Polish State Railways out of previously-operating "Main Mechanical Workshops". The network included yards in most larger towns of Poland and was headed by the largest of workshops, the ZNTK Ostrów in Ostrów Wielkopolski. Despite its name, some of the ZNTK also manufactured rolling stock, like diesel locomotives and diesel multiple units (ZNTK Poznań).

In 1991 the ZNTK network was excluded from within the Polish State Railways holding. Since then most of them were either privatized or liquidated. The most important companies founded on the basis of former ZNTK workshops are:

- ZNTK Bydgoszcz - PESA SA
- ZNTK Mińsk Mazowiecki - PESA Mińsk Mazowiecki, part of PESA SA
- ZNTK Gliwice & ZNTK Nowy Sącz - Newag
- ZNTK Gorzów Wielkopolski - PKP Cargotabor Zakład Napraw Taboru
- ZNTK Ostróda - GATX Rail Poland, part of GATX
- ZNTK Ostrów - Polski Tabor Szynowy - Wagon
- ZNTK Poznań - Poznańskie Zakłady Naprawcze Taboru Kolejowego – liquidated in 2018
- ZNTK Stargard - Zakład Pojazdów Szynowych (MTR-ZPS Sp. z o.o.)
