= Trako =

International railway trade fair held in Gdańsk, Poland

Trako trade fair logo

Trako (officially Trako International Railway Fair) is the largest railway trade fair in Poland and the second largest in Europe.

The exhibition was held in Gdynia in 1996, 1998, and 1999, and since 2001, it has taken place in Gdańsk every two years as part of the Gdańsk International Fair. Since 2013, the event has been hosted at the AmberExpo exhibition and office complex, located at 11 Żaglowa Street in Gdańsk.

The project director is Dorota Daszkowska-Kosewska.

== History ==
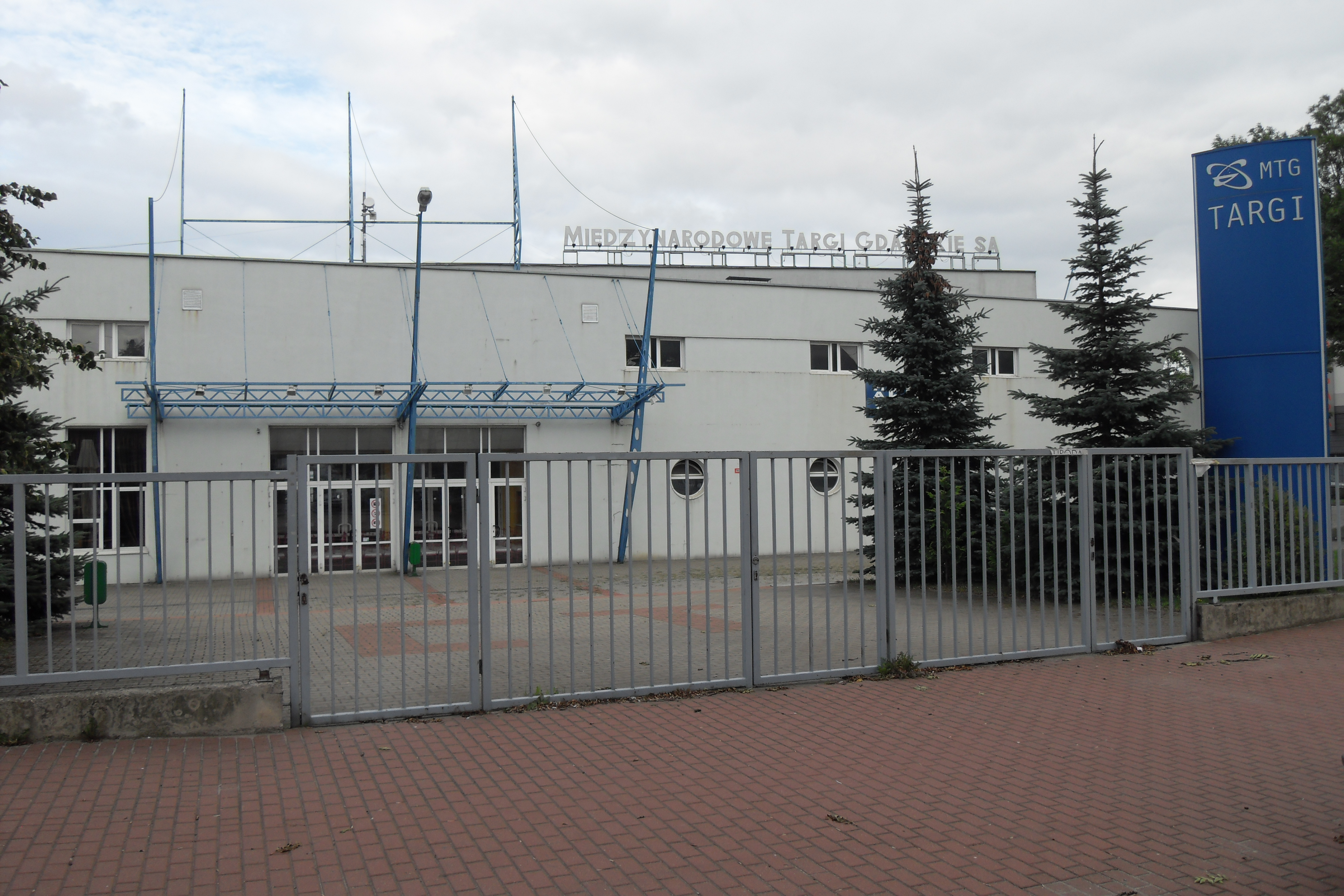
MTG Exhibition Centre, Trako's venue from 2001 to 2011

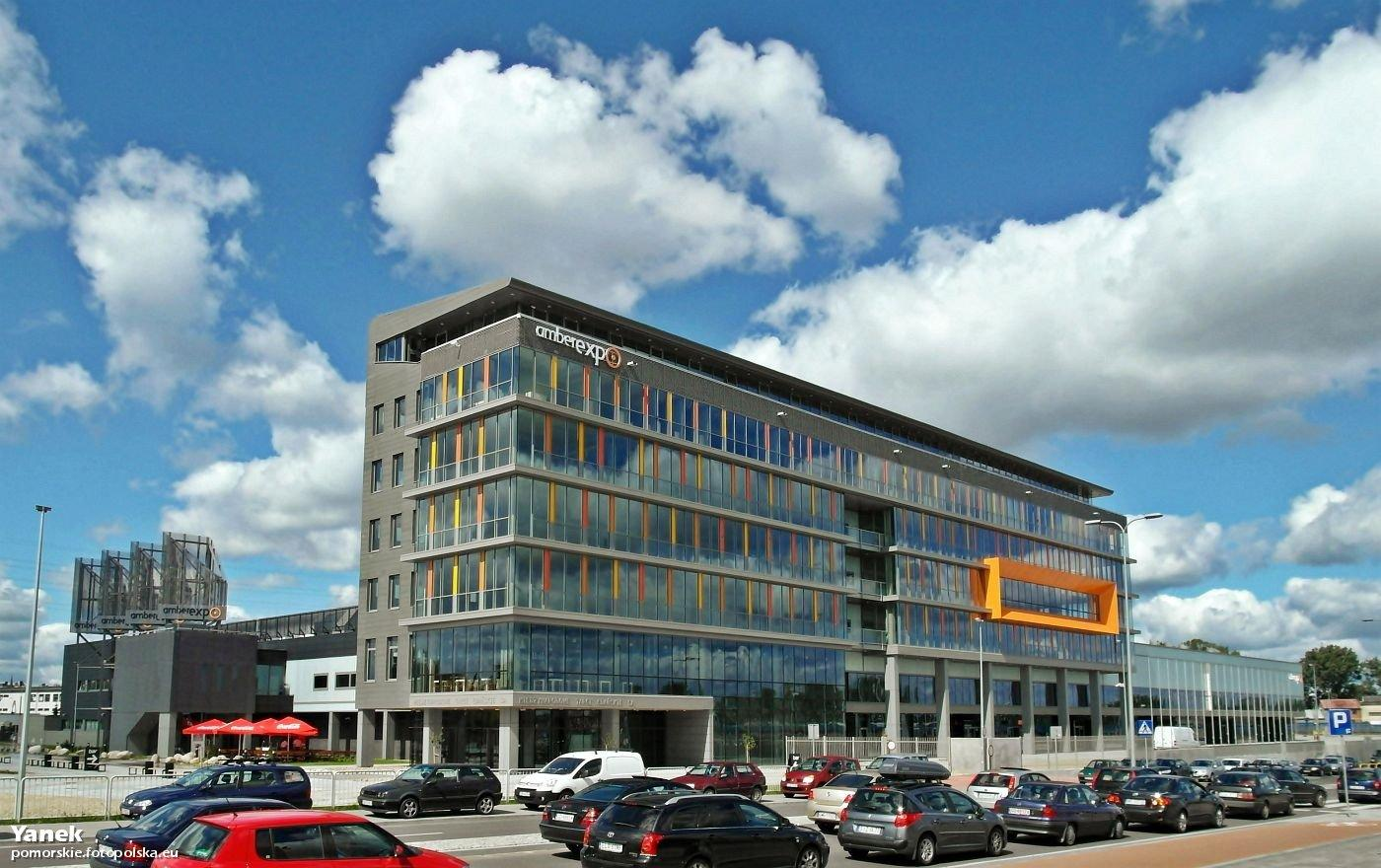
AmberExpo, Trako's venue since 2013

In the mid-1990s, Poland's economic transformations focused on advancing transportation. The only recurring national railway rolling stock exhibition at the time was part of the Poznań International Fair. In 1995, the idea of organizing a specialized railway trade fair emerged at the East European World Trade Center Gdynia Expo. The goal was to showcase technological advancements, facilitate information exchange on development trends, and review global railway industry tendencies. Gdynia was chosen as the venue, with the event planned on a biennial cycle. The first Trako was held in 1996, a collaboration between WTC Gdynia Expo, Polish State Railways, industry associations, and academics. After the 1998 edition, exhibitors' suggestions led to scheduling Trako in odd-numbered years to avoid overlapping with the Berlin-based InnoTrans fair. The first three events took place at WTC Gdynia Expo at 7/9 Tadeusz Wenda Street, pioneering the railway trade fair concept in Poland.

In March 2000, the Gdańsk International Fair acquired the rights to organize all trade fairs in the Tricity area from WTC Gdynia Expo, integrating them. The 4th Trako edition in 2001 was held at the MTG Exhibition Centre at Maurycy Beniowski Street in Gdańsk, with rolling stock displayed at the Gdańsk Oliwa railway station. This edition established Trako among the most significant transport exhibitions in Central and Eastern Europe. Exhibitor interest grew with each subsequent event.

In 2007, the rolling stock exhibition expanded to include a siding at the MTG site. The Chamber of Urban Transport became a partner, broadening the fair's scope to include tram transportation. In 2013, the 10th, jubilee edition of Trako was held at the new AmberExpo Exhibition and Congress Centre and the nearby Gdańsk Stadion Expo railway station, close to the Gdańsk Stadium in Letnica district. Since then, Trako has been recognized as Poland's largest and Europe's second-largest railway trade fair.

== Editions ==
Edition	Date	Organizers	Exhibition venue	Rolling stock display	Exhibitors	Countries	Visitors	Sources
I	1–4 October 1996	Polish State Railways and WTC Gdynia Expo	WTC Gdynia Expo	Gdynia Główna	104	8	3,100	
II	23–25 September 1998	Polish State Railways and WTC Gdynia Expo	WTC Gdynia Expo	Gdynia Główna	104	5	3,100	
III	20–22 October 1999	Polish State Railways and WTC Gdynia Expo	WTC Gdynia Expo	Gdynia Port Centralny	108	4	3,200	
IV	17–19 October 2001	Polish State Railways and MTG	MTG Exhibition Centre	Gdańsk Oliwa	134	11	3,600	
V	15–17 October 2003	Polish State Railways and MTG	MTG Exhibition Centre	Gdańsk Oliwa	198	15	3,690	
VI	12–14 October 2005	Polish State Railways and MTG	MTG Exhibition Centre	Gdańsk Oliwa	264	17	6,003	
VII	10–12 October 2007	Polish State Railways and MTG	MTG Exhibition Centre	Gdańsk Oliwa and MTG siding	343	17	8,974	
VIII	14–16 October 2009	Polish State Railways and MTG	MTG Exhibition Centre	Gdańsk Oliwa and MTG siding	420	17	9,200	
IX	11–14 October 2011	Polish State Railways and MTG	MTG Exhibition Centre	MTG siding	461	16	9,680	
X	24–27 September 2013	Polish State Railways and MTG	AmberExpo	Gdańsk Stadion Expo	510	25	12,892	
XI	22–25 September 2015	Polish State Railways and MTG	AmberExpo	Gdańsk Stadion Expo	Over 600	20	15,473	
XII	26–29 September 2017	Polish State Railways and MTG	AmberExpo	Gdańsk Stadion Expo	700	25	16,421	
XIII	24–27 September 2019	Polish State Railways and MTG	AmberExpo	Gdańsk Stadion Expo	647	32	17,784	
XIV	21–24 September 2021	Polish State Railways and MTG	AmberExpo	Gdańsk Stadion Expo	Over 500	39	23,000	
XV	19–22 September 2023	Polish State Railways and MTG	AmberExpo	Gdańsk Stadion Expo				

=== 1996 ===
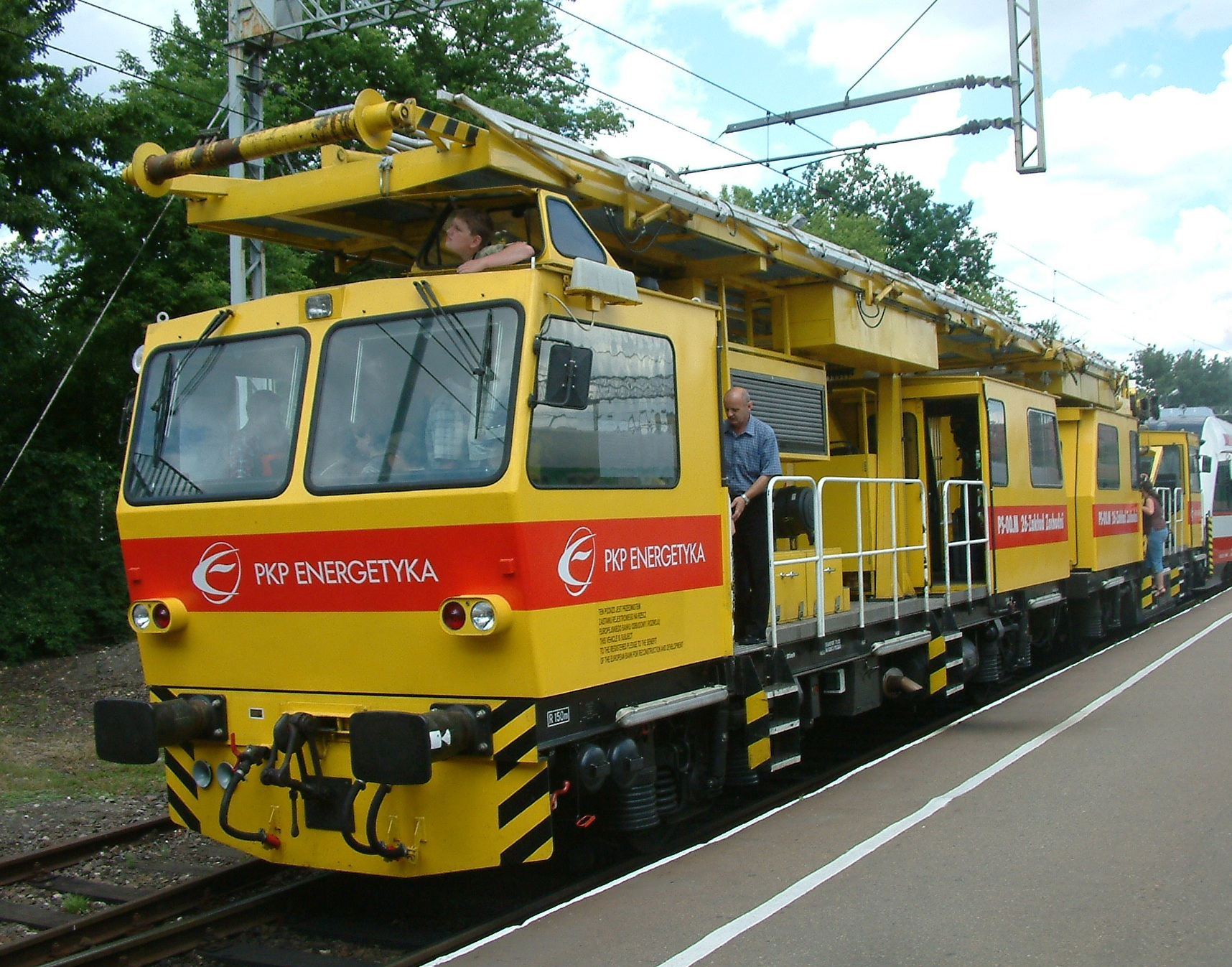
PS-00 vehicle from ZNTK Stargard

The first edition, titled 1st Trako International Railway Convention '96, took place from 1 to 4 October 1996 at the Expo hall in Gdynia. Exhibition stands, spread across two floors, featured domestic railway companies (primarily ZNTK), international firms, and trade publications. A scientific-technical conference ran concurrently, while rolling stock was displayed at Gdynia Główna railway station:

- Alstom Konstal: Tank wagon for liquid gas, tank wagon for liquid fuels
- Deutsche Waggonbau: Double-deck control car for 1st and 2nd class in push-pull train systems, two-axle wagon with sliding walls for oversized cargo
- Tabor Railway Vehicle Institute: Bimodal transport set with two tankers and one box trailer
- Zastal: Two-axle wagon with sliding walls for oversized cargo
- ZNTK Bydgoszcz and ZNTK Nowy Sącz: Sleeping car type Görlitz
- ZNTK Gniewczyna: Four-axle coal wagon type 424W, wagon with sliding hoods
- ZNTK Piła: SM42-2000
- ZNTK Stargard: Track maintenance train type PS-00

=== 1998 ===
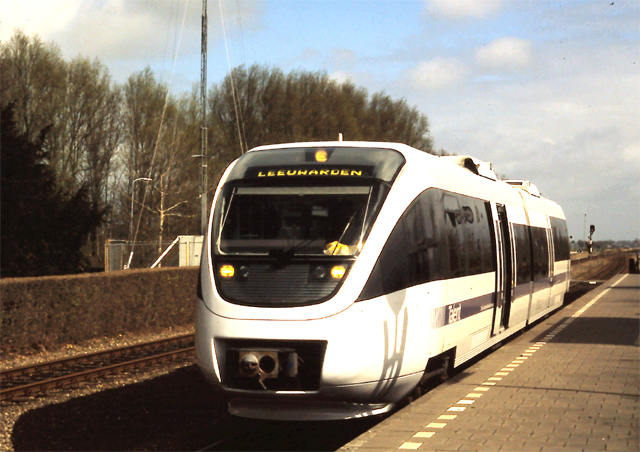
Prototype of Talent

The 2nd Trako International Railway Convention was held from 23 to 25 September 1998 in Gdynia. The main hall hosted exhibitor stands, including leading international rolling stock manufacturers and most domestic producers and repair plants. On the first day, a press conference featured Polish State Railways CEO Jan Janik, outlining the company's restructuring plans. The event included the symposium Railway into the 21st Century and the first-ever Trako awards. In the Ernest Malinowski competition for the best product, three equal distinctions were awarded to: an automated passenger information system from ZNTK Mińsk Mazowiecki, an axle counter from Frauscher Polska, and a hydraulic level crossing drive from Kombud. Six exhibitors received awards for the most interesting displays: Adtranz, Alstom, Bombardier, DGT, Taps, and Siemens. Freight wagons were displayed on tracks next to the hall, and at Gdynia Główna:

- Bombardier: Talent
- ZNTK Nowy Sącz: Modernized dining car, modernized technical wagon for track surface inspection

=== 1999 ===
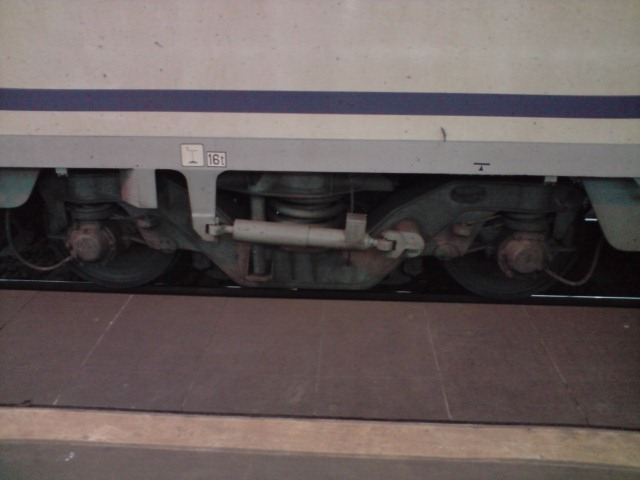
Bogie 25ANa, winner of the Ernest Malinowski award

The 3rd edition, renamed Trako International Railway Fair 1999, was held from 20 to 22 October 1999, exceptionally a year after the previous event to avoid overlapping with Berlin's InnoTrans fair, held in even-numbered years. The Ernest Malinowski awards were given to: a bogie type 25ANa by ZNTK Poznań, a computer-based automatic block signaling system by Adtranz, and a modular electrical control cabinet for passenger cars by ZNTK Bydgoszcz. A new award named after Czesław Jaworski recognized outstanding achievements in electric traction technology. The award went to the Institute of Electrical Apparatus at Łódź University of Technology, ABB, and Woltan for a new generation of direct current circuit breakers. Distinctions were awarded to: asbestos-free modernized traction contactors by Adtranz, a static railway converter by Medcom, and a static passenger car converter by Adtranz. The best exhibition stands were recognized in categories for areas above and below 35 m². Rolling stock was displayed on sidings near the exhibition hall at Gdynia Port Centralny:

- Adtranz: Regio-Shuttle RS1
- Alstom Konstal: Self-discharging wagon Falns 121
- Tabor Polski: Self-discharging wagon Falns for bulk materials, self-discharging wagon Sis with variable wheel gauge bogie
- ZNTK Bydgoszcz: Self-discharging wagon 443V Fal

=== 2001 ===
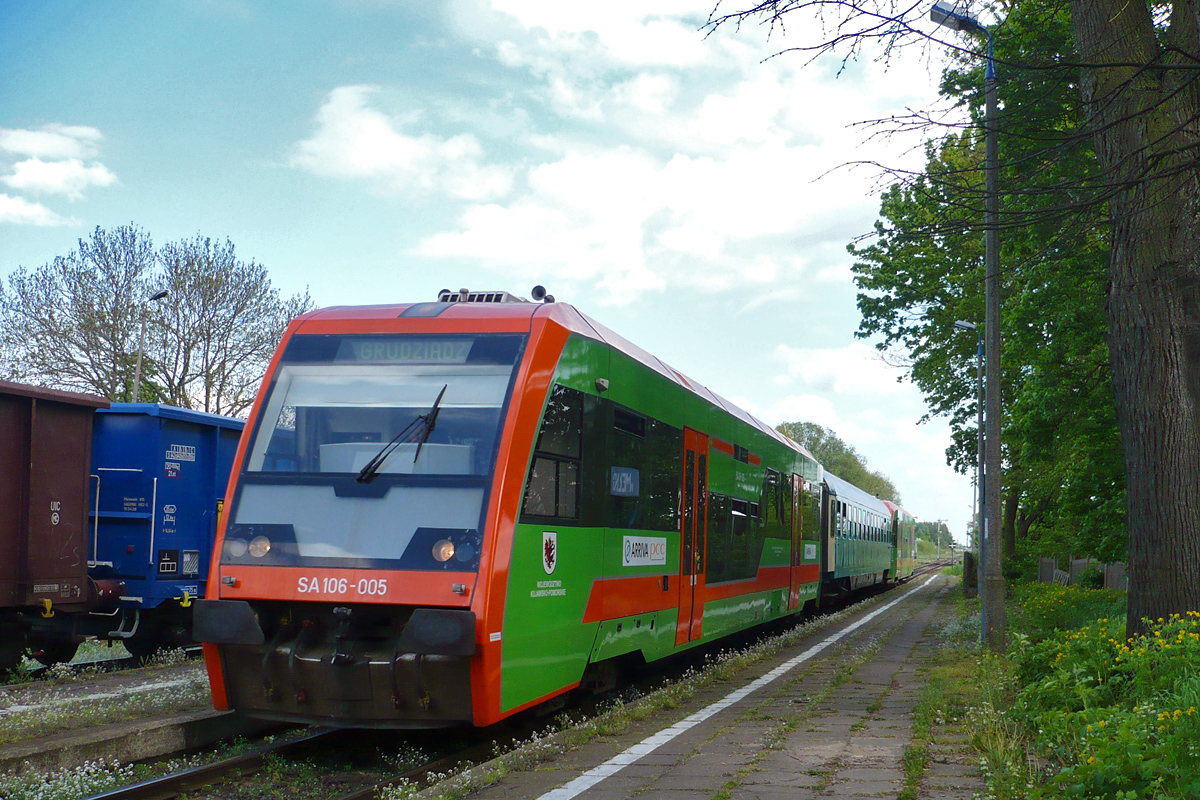
Vehicle from the Partner family by Pesa

The 4th Trako International Railway Fair was held from 17 to 19 October 2001 at the MTG and Gdańsk Oliwa. Despite a stagnant railway market, over 130 exhibitors participated, setting a record at the time. The event featured seminars, the symposium Friendly Railway Transport, and the model exhibition World of Small Railways. Several competitions were judged. Three equal Ernest Malinowski awards went to Siemens, Adtranz, and Pesa, with a distinction for Kombud. The Czesław Jaworski award was won by Enika, with distinctions for Frauscher Polska and Arex, which also received the Association of Polish Electrical Engineers President's medal. Voith won for the best stand under 20 m², while Siemens took the award for stands over 20 m². The rolling stock exhibition included:

- Alstom: Coradia LINT 41
- Fabryka Wagon: 436S Snpss
- Fabryka Wagonów Gniewczyna: 401Zp
- Pesa: Partner (competition winner)
- Railway Transport and Stone Management Company Rybnik: SM42
- Zastal: 218K Hbbins, 437Z Shmmns

=== 2003 ===
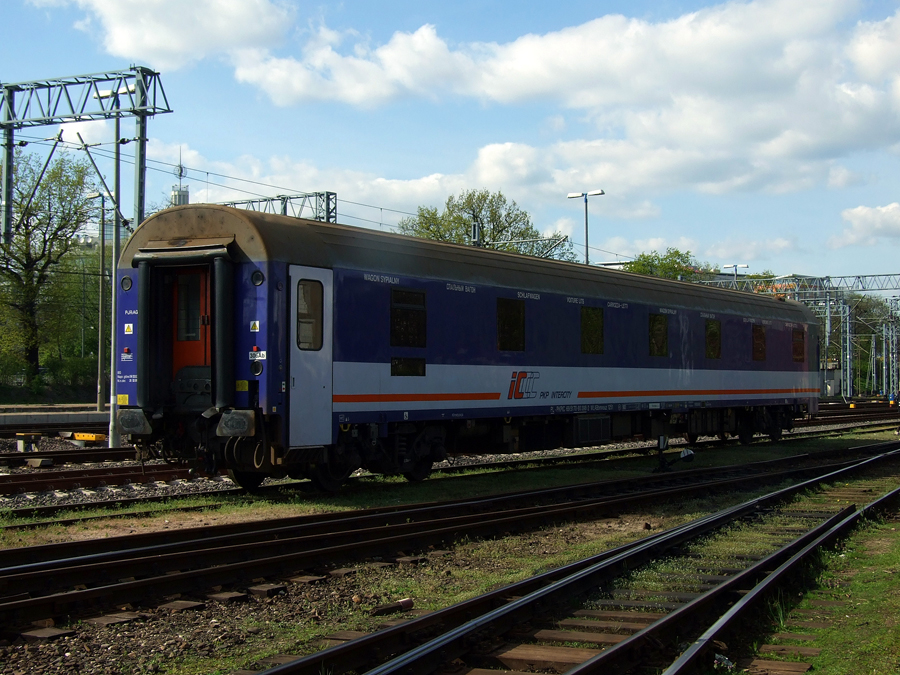
Modernized 306A wagon by Pesa, winner of the Ernest Malinowski award

The 5th Trako International Railway Fair took place from 15 to 17 October 2003. Interest exceeded the previous edition, signaling a revival in Poland's railway industry. A notable event was the signing of a contract between PKP Polskie Linie Kolejowe and Alstom Pojazdy Szynowe for the design, delivery, and installation of railway signalling devices on part of the E 30 railway. The event included the conference Railway – Integration – Europe, a Association of Polish Electrical Engineers seminar on Impact of Maintenance Quality on Electrical Safety and Passenger Security, the World of Small Railways exhibition, and the third Polish Railway Model Championships. Ernest Malinowski awards went to Kombud, Pesa, Vossloh, Communication Automation and Telecommunication Plants in Poznań, and Taps. The Czesław Jaworski special award was won by Woltan, with distinctions for Enika, Elester-PKP, and Medcom. Kamax had the most attractive stand under 20 m², and Pesa won for stands above this size. Displayed rolling stock included:

- Bombardier: Push-pull train led by locomotive 219 125
- Pesa: 306A (competition winner)
- Warsaw Commuter Railway: Lounge car
- ZNLE Gliwice: 3E/1-86

=== 2005 ===
The 6th Trako International Railway Fair was held from 12 to 14 October 2005. It saw a record number of exhibitors and a surge in the component market. Exhibitors showcased braking systems, Poland's first and one of Europe's few power inverter-based drive systems, voltage converters, current collectors, high-speed circuit breakers, interior equipment, and air conditioners.

The day before the fair, a seminar addressed Interface of 1435/1520 mm Railway Systems: Interoperability, Standardization, Certification. After the opening, a debate titled I Choose the Railway was held. On the second day, a two-session conference discussed Polish Railways in the Liberalized EU Market.

Equal Ernest Malinowski awards were given to Alstom Pojazdy Szynowe, Bumar-Fablok, and PKP Informatyka, with distinctions for EC Engineering, Graw Technical Services Company, Communication Automation and Telecommunication Plants, and Medcom. The Czesław Jaworski award went to Pesa, with distinctions for Graw, Medcom, and Enika. Pesa also received the Association of Polish Electrical Engineers President's medal. The most attractive stands were by Cargosped and Railway Transport and Stone Management Company.

Approximately 500 meters of exhibition tracks featured:

- Bumar-Fablok: ST44-3001 (competition winner)
- Masovian Railways: EN57-1920
- Newag: 14WE-02 Halny
- Pesa: EN81-001, SA131-001
- PKP Polskie Linie Kolejowe: WM-15A/PRT-00 02
- ZNLE Gliwice: ET22-2000
- Sigma Poznań: 60-1341-1, SA108-003 Regio Tramp, W 232.08
Rolling stock at Trako 2005
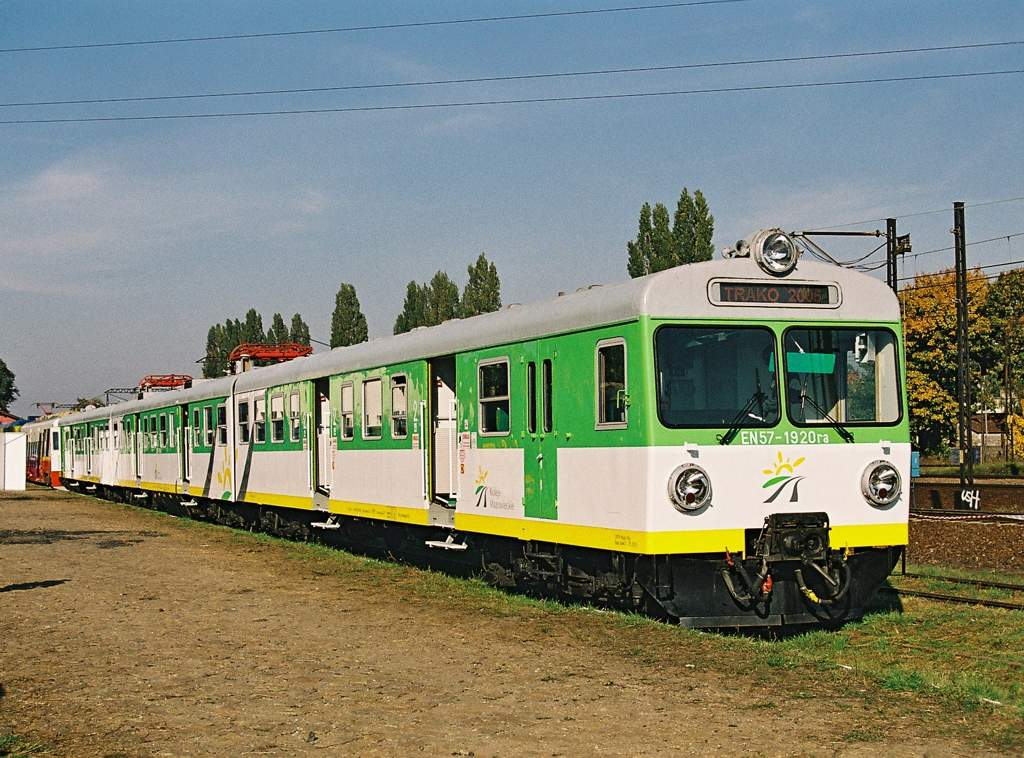
EN57-1920

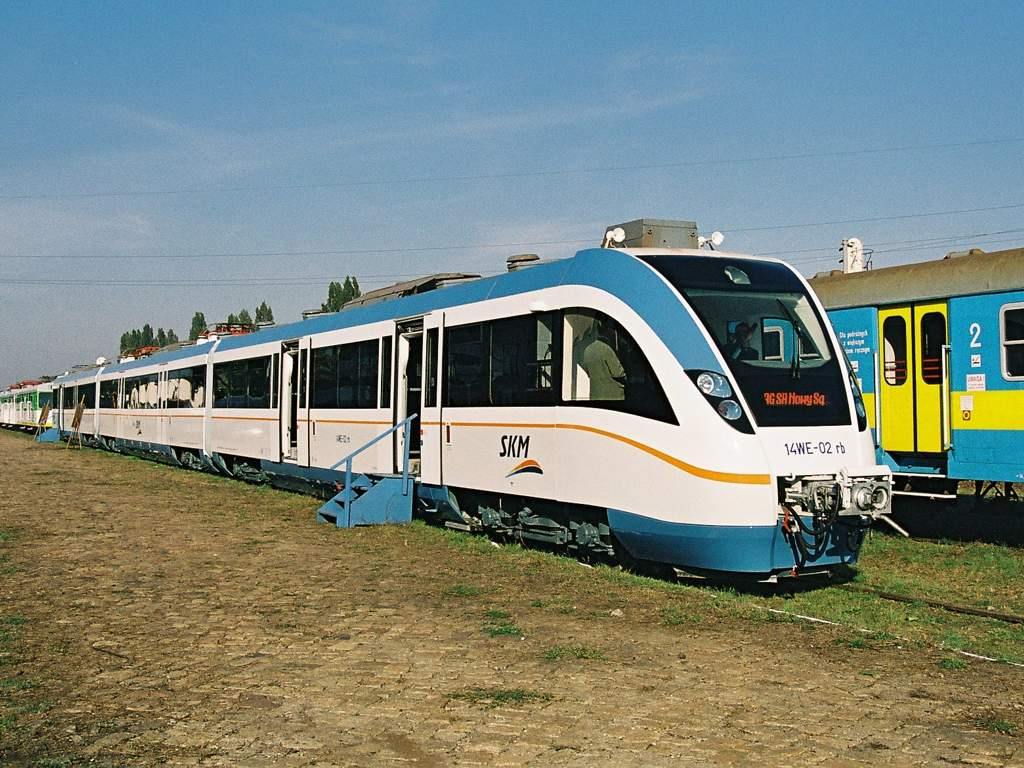
14WE-02 Halny

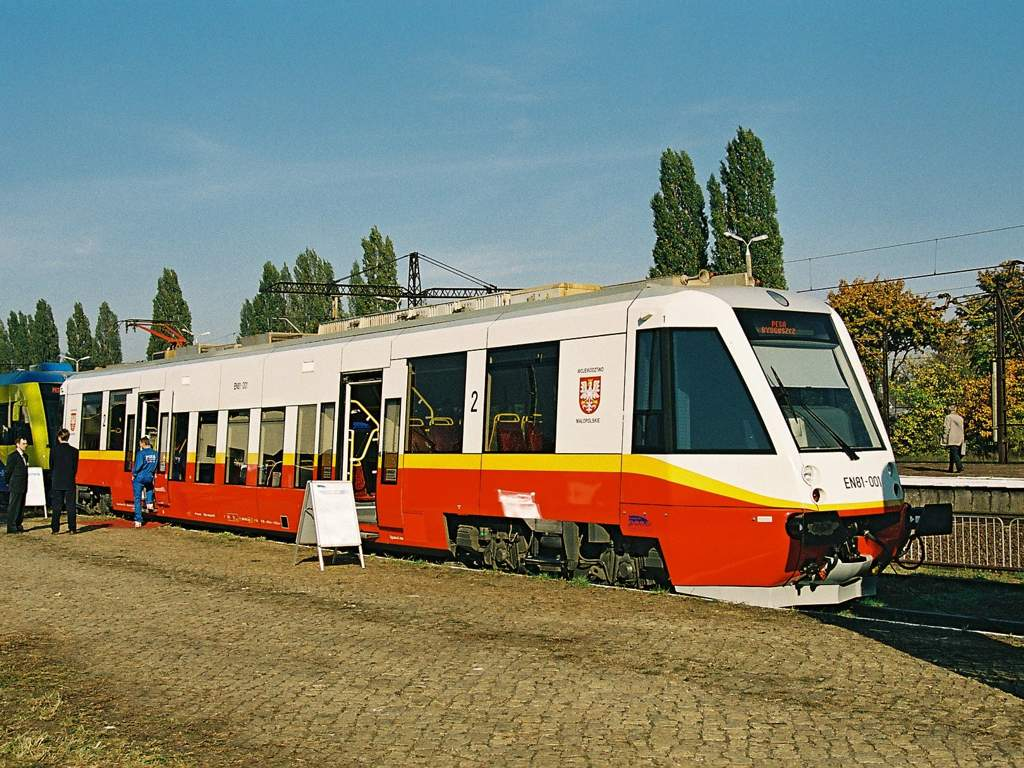
EN81-001

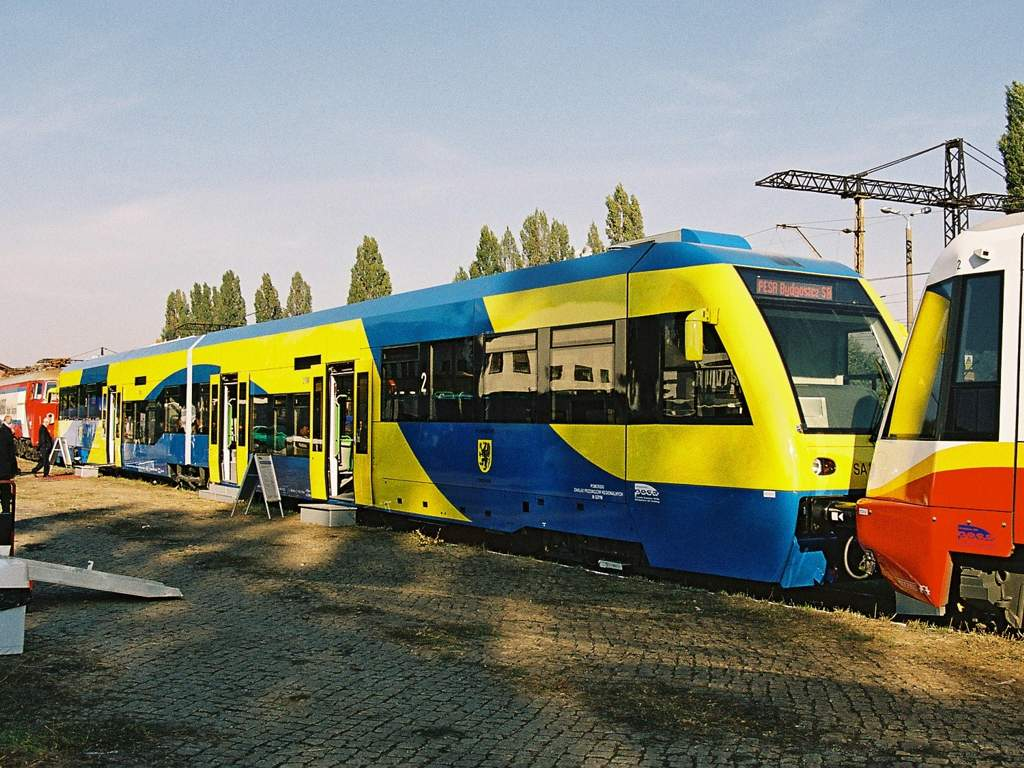
SA131-001

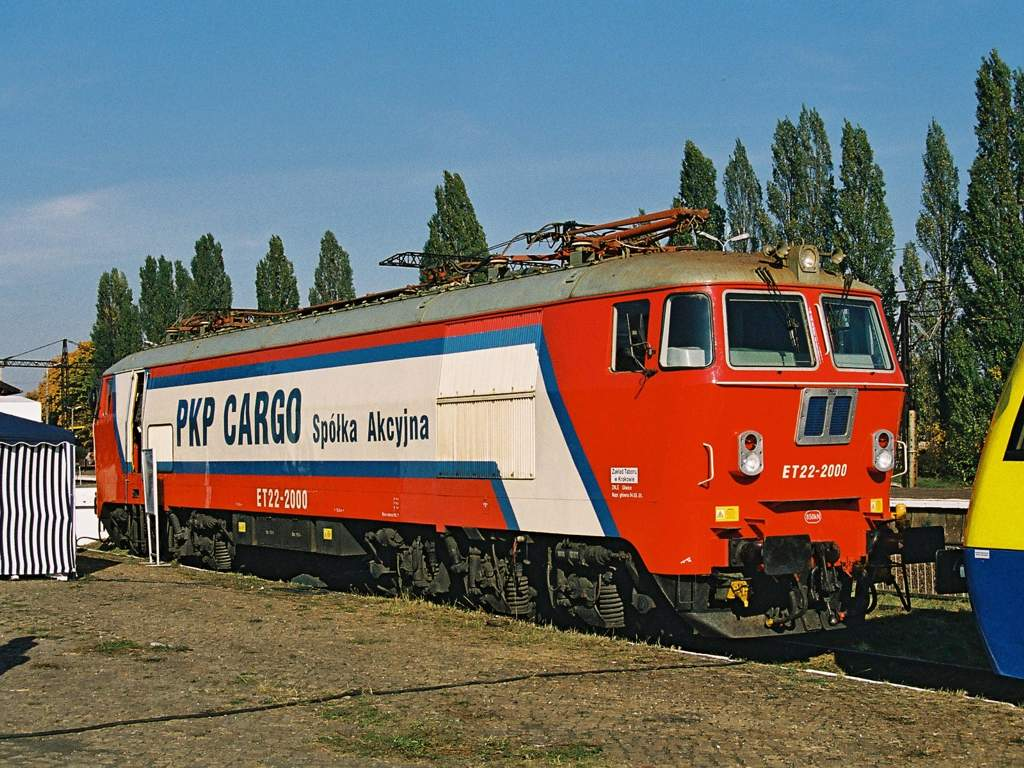
ET22-2000

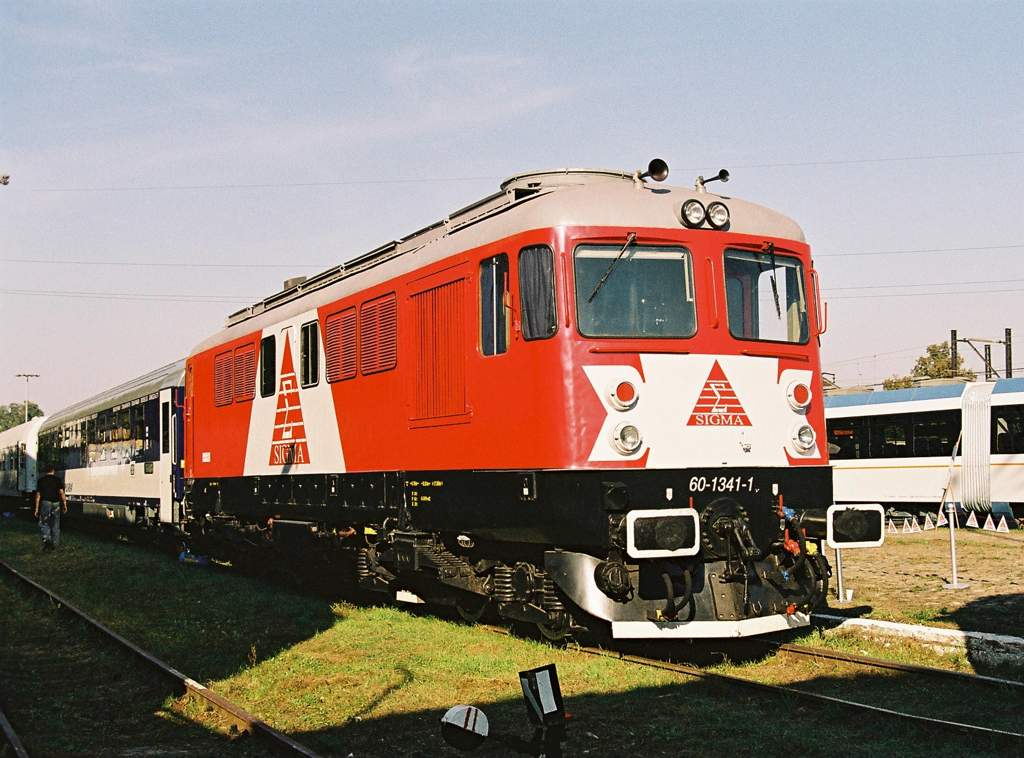
60-1341-1

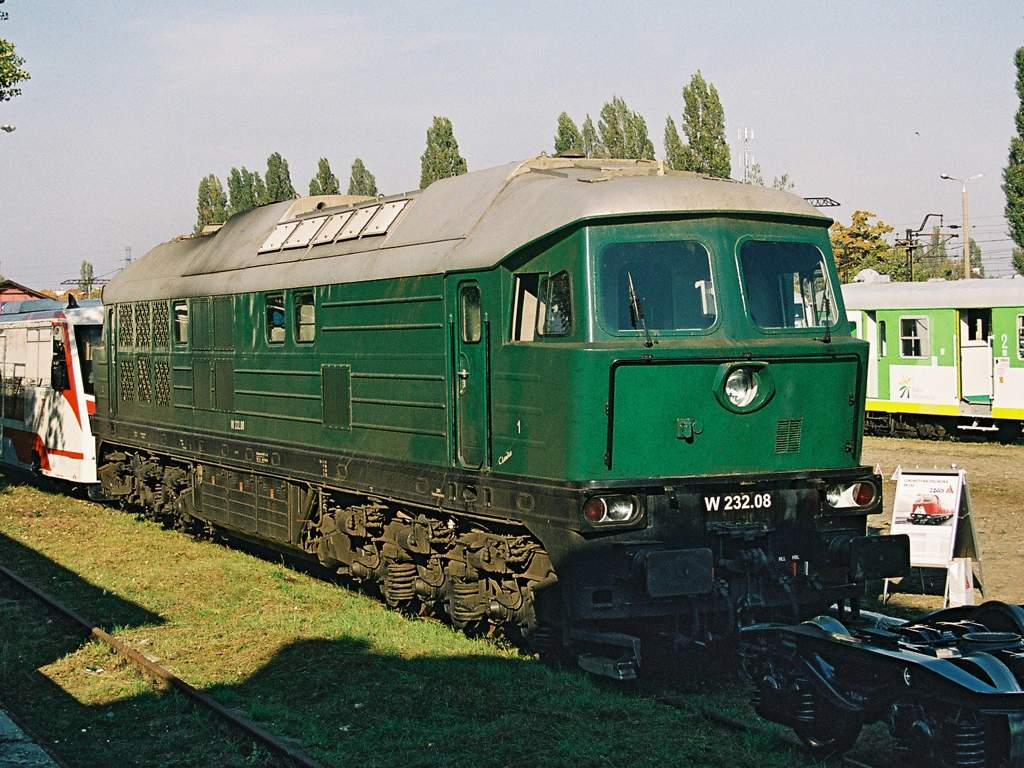
W 232.08

=== 2007 ===
The 7th Trako International Railway Fair was held from 10 to 12 October 2007. The event saw another increase in exhibitors, making it the second-largest railway trade fair in Europe. Stands were set up in three halls, with the newest opened just before the event, and outdoors. Exhibitors offered a full range of products and services, including urban rail transport.

The day before the fair, the second edition of the seminar Interface of 1,435/1,520 mm Railway Systems: Interoperability – Safety – Technologies and the first seminar Ad adapting Tram Transport to Modern Passenger Expectations took place. After the opening, a debate titled Railway in Poland in 2020 was held, followed by seminars on the second day: Rail Transport Market in Poland – Experiences and Forecasts and Railways in Agglomerations.

In the Ernest Malinowski competition, three equal awards went to Kombud, Modertrans Poznań, and PKP Informatyka, with nine distinctions awarded to H. Cegielski – Rail Vehicles Factory, Graw, Newag, ZNTK Poznań, Industrial Institute of Automation and Measurements, Tines, Siemens, Woltan, and Non-Electrical Quantities Measurement Electronics Plant. The Czesław Jaworski award was won by Woltan, with distinctions for Medcom and Pesa, which also received the Association of Polish Electrical Engineers President's medal. For the first time, awards for long-term contributions to rail transport technology were given to Enika, Pesa, and Siemens. The most attractive stands were presented by Cantoni Motor, ZNLE Gliwice, Stadler Polska, Siemens, Medcom, and Knorr-Bremse.

The rolling stock exhibition was expanded with a newly built three-track siding, displaying:

- Angel Trains Poland: F140 MS Traxx
- Bombardier Transportation: Twindexx control car
- H. Cegielski – Rail Vehicles Factory: 118N Puma (competition distinction)
- Masovian Railways: EN57KM-1486
- Newag: 6Dg-01 (competition distinction), 311D-04
- Pesa: ED74-005 Bydgostia
- PKP Intercity: 111A, 112A
- Siemens: Rh 1216 050-5 EuroSprinter, E 189 911 EuroSprinter
- Szybka Kolej Miejska: EN57-1094
Rolling stock at Trako 2007
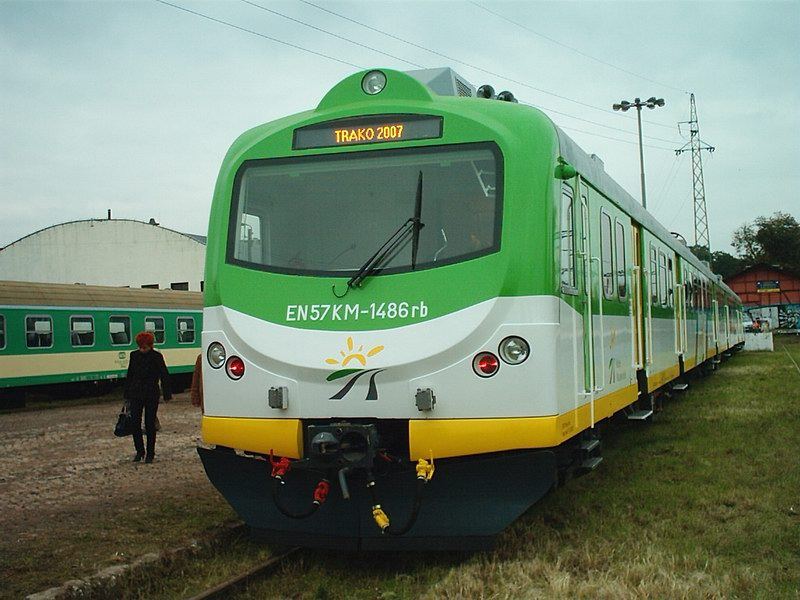
EN57KM-1486

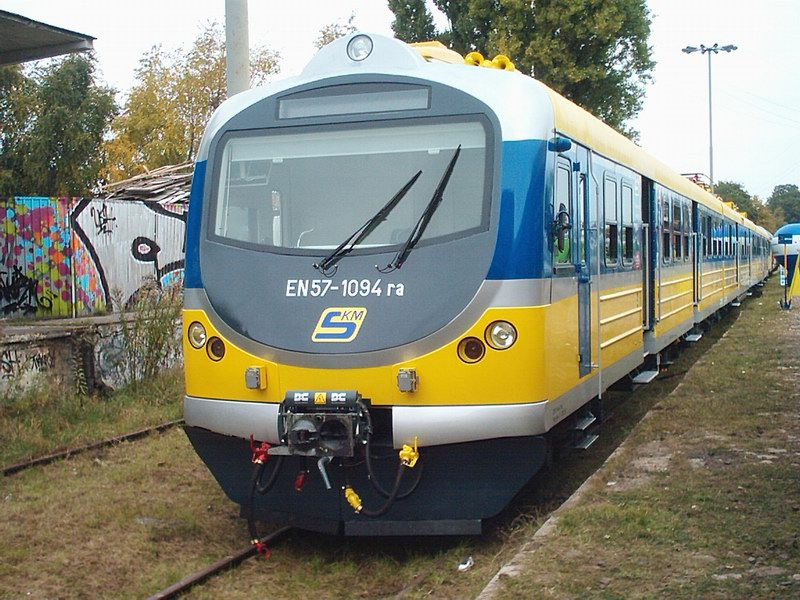
EN57-1094

=== 2009 ===
The 8th Trako International Railway Fair was held from 14 to 16 October 2009. Exhibitors, including operators, rolling stock and component manufacturers, consultancies, trade publishers, and railway organizations, displayed in seven halls and three outdoor areas of the Gdańsk International Fair.

The day before the fair, the 3rd International Seminar on 1,435/1,520 mm Railway Systems Interface and the 2nd Technical Seminar were held. The opening ceremony featured a debate on Railway Investments as a Means to Mitigate Economic Crisis Effects, with experts, politicians, local authorities, and representatives of international and EU railway institutions. The second day included an open debate on the ERTMS.

In the Ernest Malinowski competition, awards and distinctions were given in three categories:

- Rolling Stock: Siemens, ZNLE Gliwice, and ZEPWN J. Czerwiński i Wspólnicy
- Infrastructure: NEEL Implementation and Production Company, Bombardier Transportation Polska, and Kombud
- Information Technologies: Funkwerk Information Technologies, Railway Telecommunications, and PKP Informatyka

The Czesław Jaworski award went to Kuca Production Company, with distinctions for Woltan, ZNLE Gliwice with Institute of Electronics, and Medcom. The most attractive stands were by H. Cegielski – Rail Vehicles Factory, Cantoni Group, Vagónka Trebišov, Tines, Alstom Konstal, and Stadler Polska.

At Gdańsk Oliwa railway station, the following rolling stock was displayed:

- Bombardier: Push-pull train
- Bumar-Fablok: M62-3104
- H. Cegielski – Rail Vehicles Factory: 158A
- Newag: SM42-1501, EN71AC-045
- Pesa: ST45-01, SM42-1601, ATR220-029 Nicolas
- PKP Cargo: EU43-004 Traxx
- PKP Intercity: 111Arow
- Siemens: E183 602-2 Husarz (competition winner)
- Sigma Poznań: DH-3206 Wadloper
- Solaris: S100 Tramino
- Stadler: 2 140 005-1 FLIRT
- Opole Rail Rolling Stock: Low-floor platform type 602S for TIR transport
- Voith: 40 CC Maxima
- ZNLE Gliwice: E6ACT Dragon (competition distinction)
Rolling stock at Trako 2009
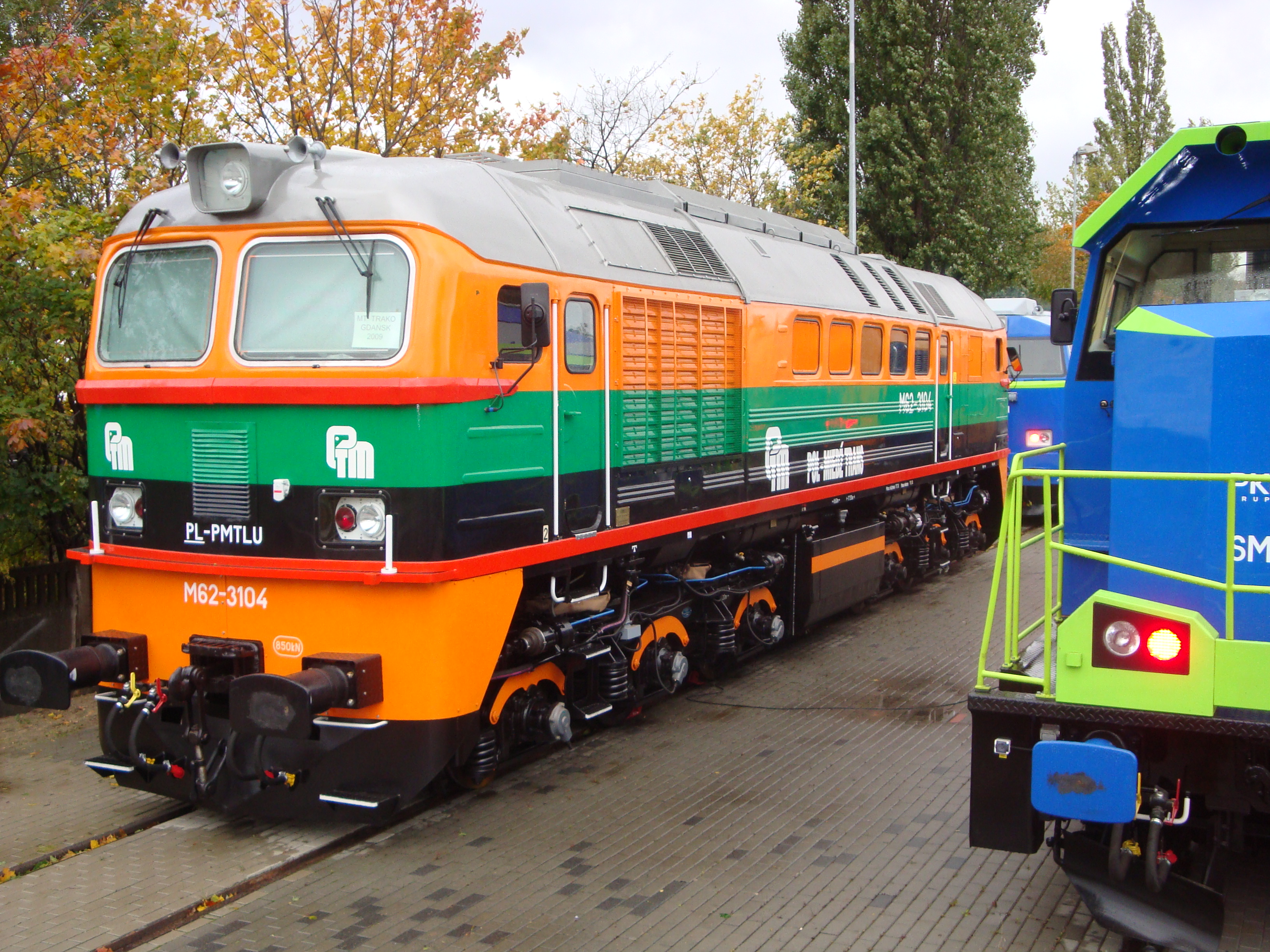
M62-3104

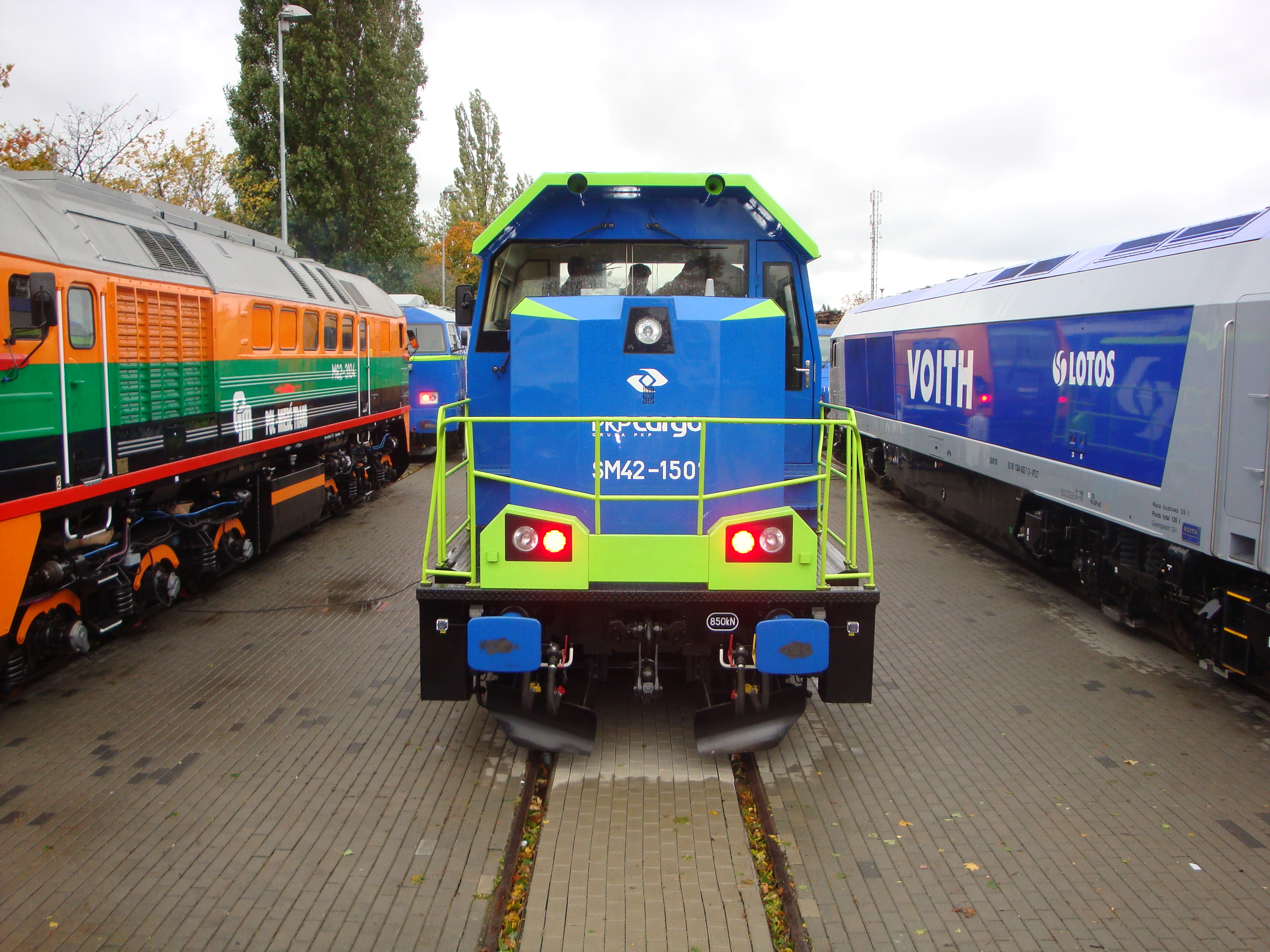
SM42-1501

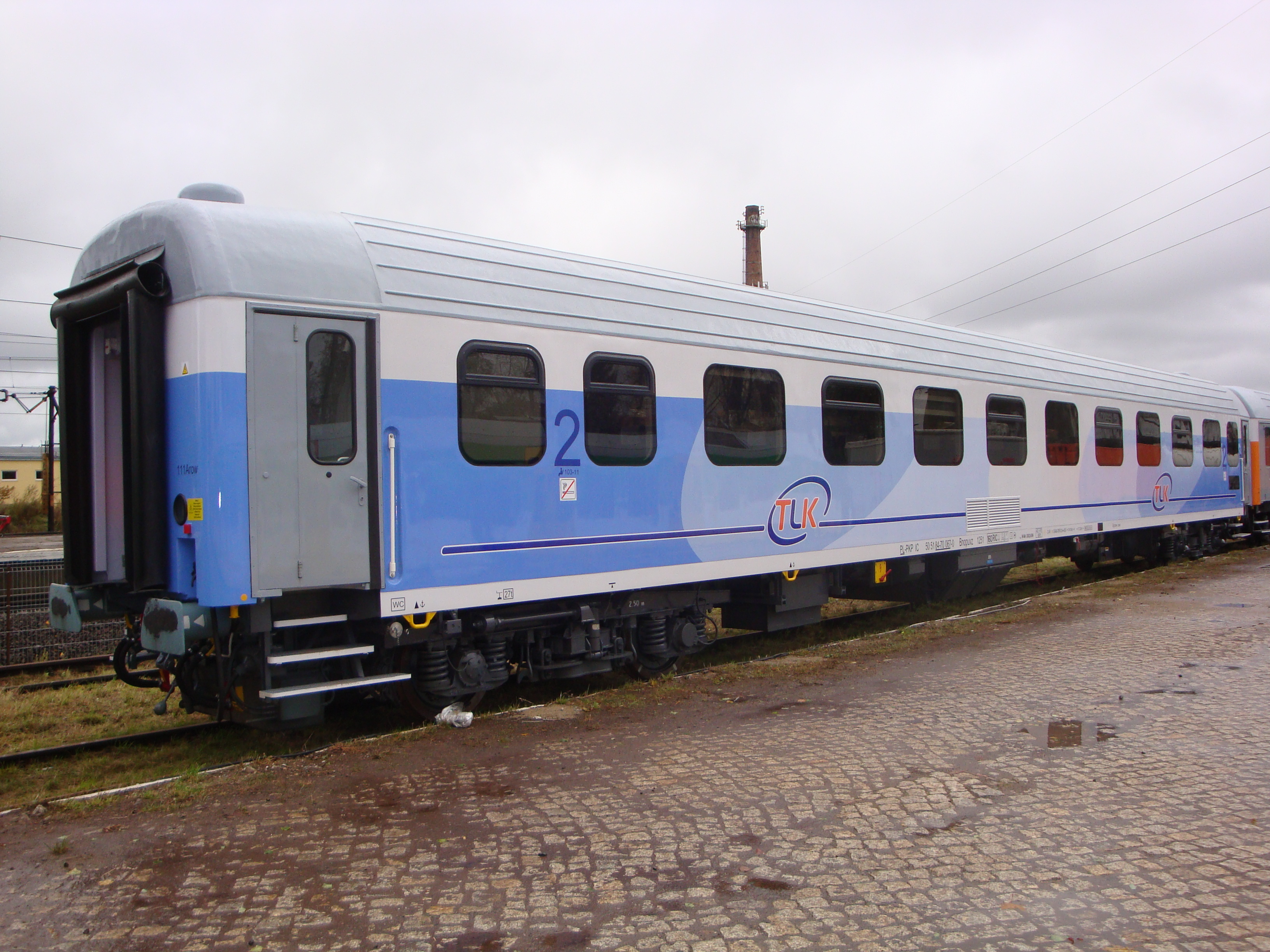
111Arow

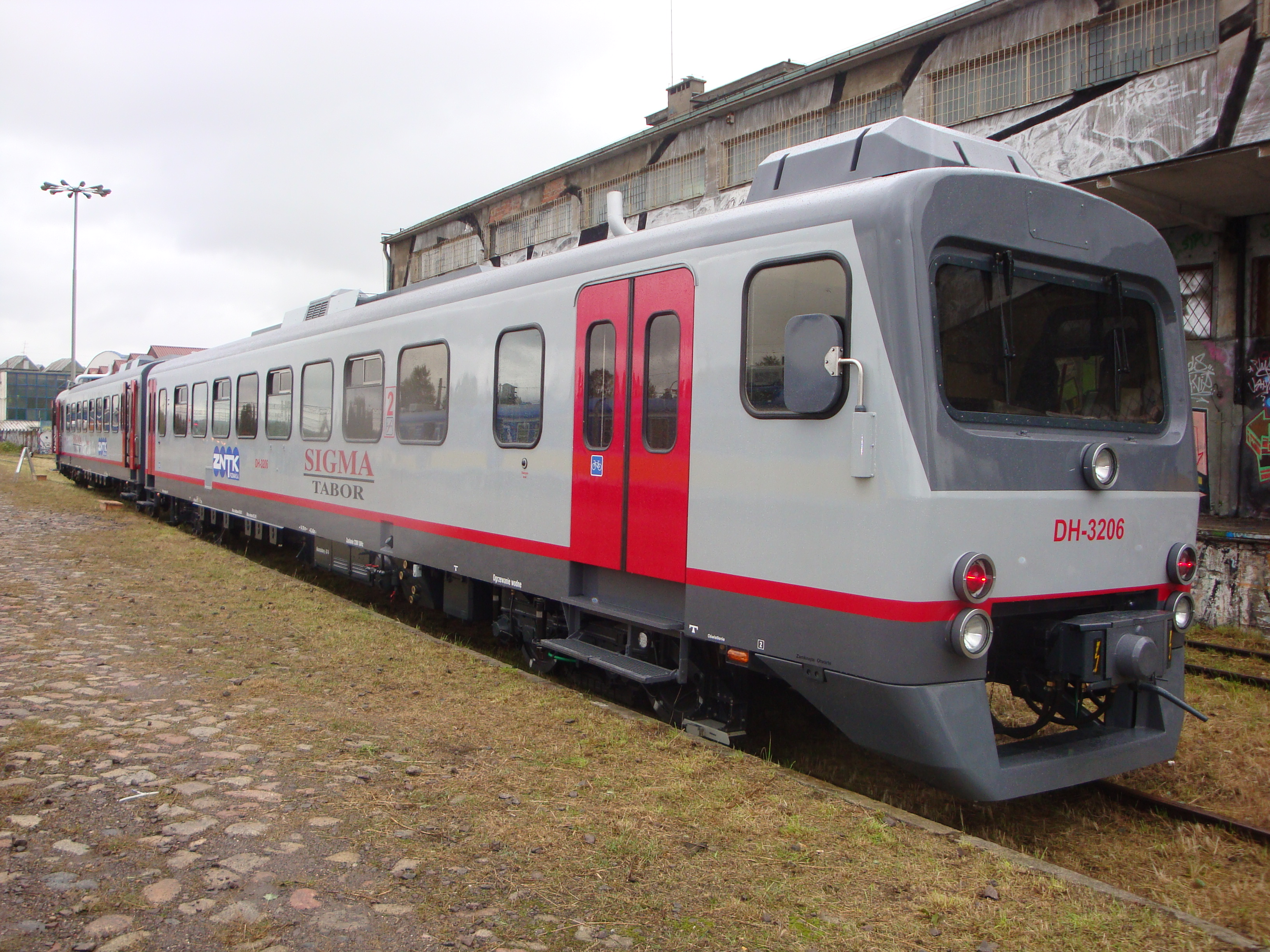
DH-3206 Wadloper

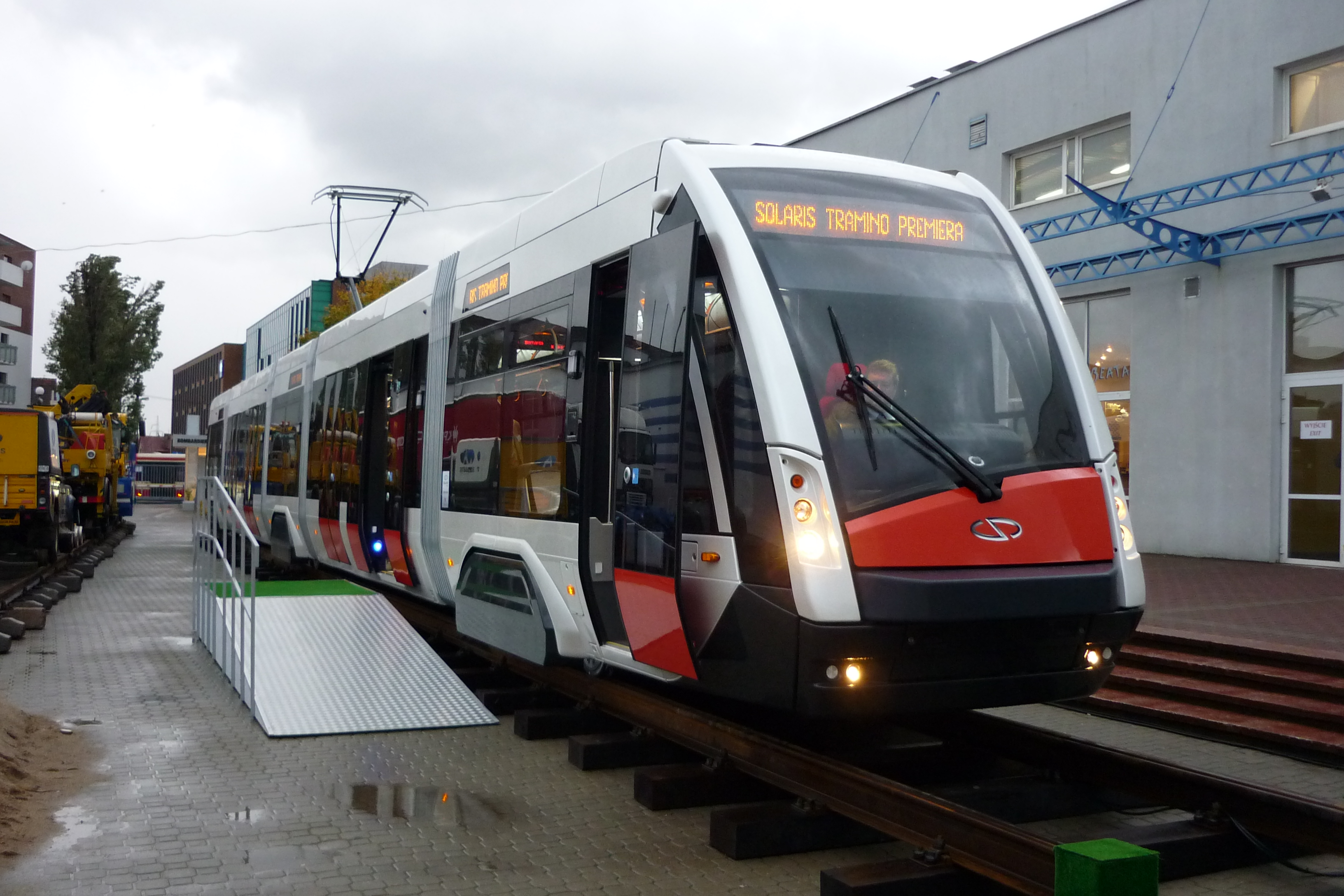
S100 Tramino

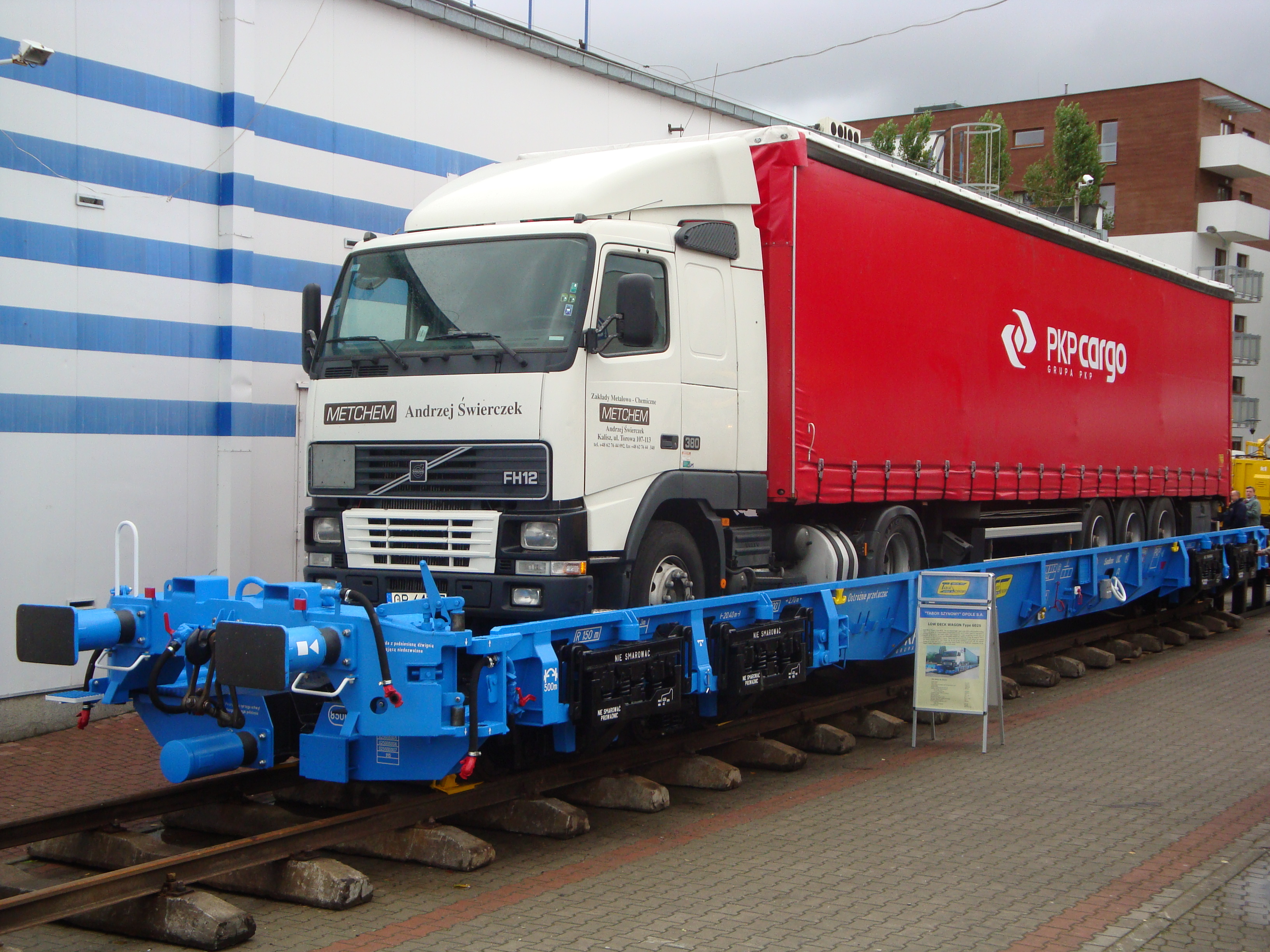
Platform type 602S

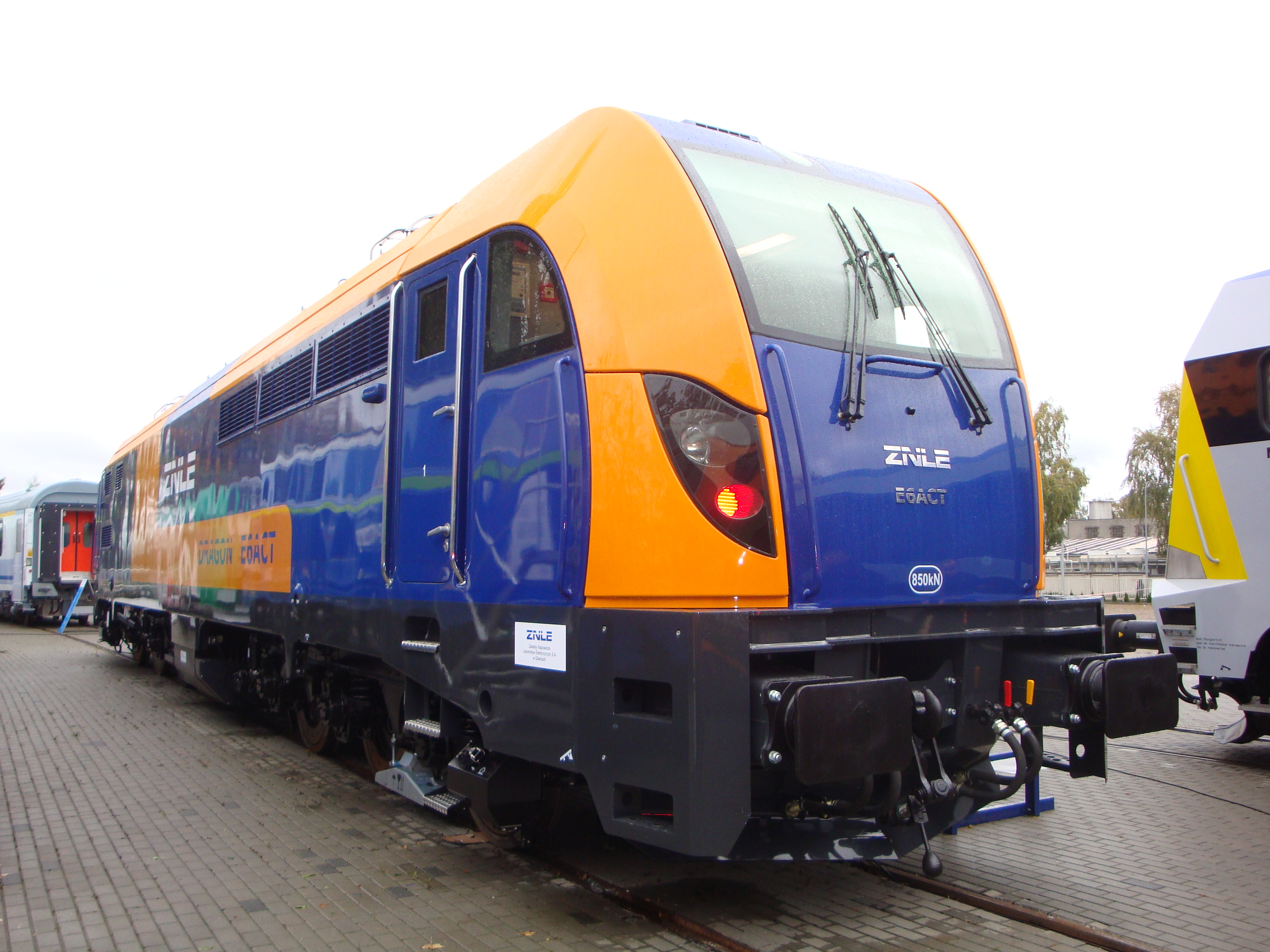
E6ACT Dragon

=== 2011 ===
The 9th Trako International Railway Fair was held from 11 to 14 October 2011, marking the first four-day edition and the opening of a new 2,000 m² hall, replacing temporary halls 3A and 4A.

In the Ernest Malinowski competition, Solaris Bus & Coach won the Rolling Stock category, with distinctions for Pesa and Medcom. Bombardier Transportation Polska won the Infrastructure category, with a distinction for Tines. TK Telekom won the IT category, with a distinction for PKP Informatyka.

In the Jan Podoski competition, Solaris won the Railway Rolling Stock category, Tines won Infrastructure, Trakcja-Tiltra won Power Supply and Electrical Infrastructure, and Novamedia Innovision won Other Systems for Control, IT, Ticketing, and Passenger Services. A distinction went to the Mint of Poland.

The Association of Polish Electrical Engineers President's medal was awarded to Strunobet-Migacz, with distinctions for Trakcja-Tiltra and Pesa. The Association of Communication Engineers and Technicians of the Republic of Poland awarded Pesa for electric traction achievements, with distinctions for Medcom and Strunobet-Migacz. Stands by Dellner Couplers, Railway Publishing House, Śrubena Unia, Solaris, DB Schenker Rail Polska, and Bahn Technik were recognized.

Due to the modernization of Gdańsk Główny–Stargard railway and the reconstruction of Gdańsk Oliwa, the rolling stock exhibition was held on special tracks at Droszyński Street:

- CZ Loko: 797 823-2, MUV 74.001
- Masovian Railways: EN76-015 Elf (Association of Communication Engineers and Technicians of the Republic of Poland award and Malinowski distinction), EU47-009 Traxx, AB¹²bfmnopuvxz Twindexx
- Newag: SA137-001, 134Ac
- Pesa: EN96-002 Elf (Association of Communication Engineers and Technicians of the Republic of Poland award and Malinowski distinction)
- Siemens: 6 191 952 Vectron
- Škoda: 7 380 020
- Solaris: S105p Tramino (Malinowski and Podoski awards)
- ZNLE Gliwice: E6ACT-001 Dragon
- Voith: 1 126 304 Gravita 10 BB
Rolling stock at Trako 2011
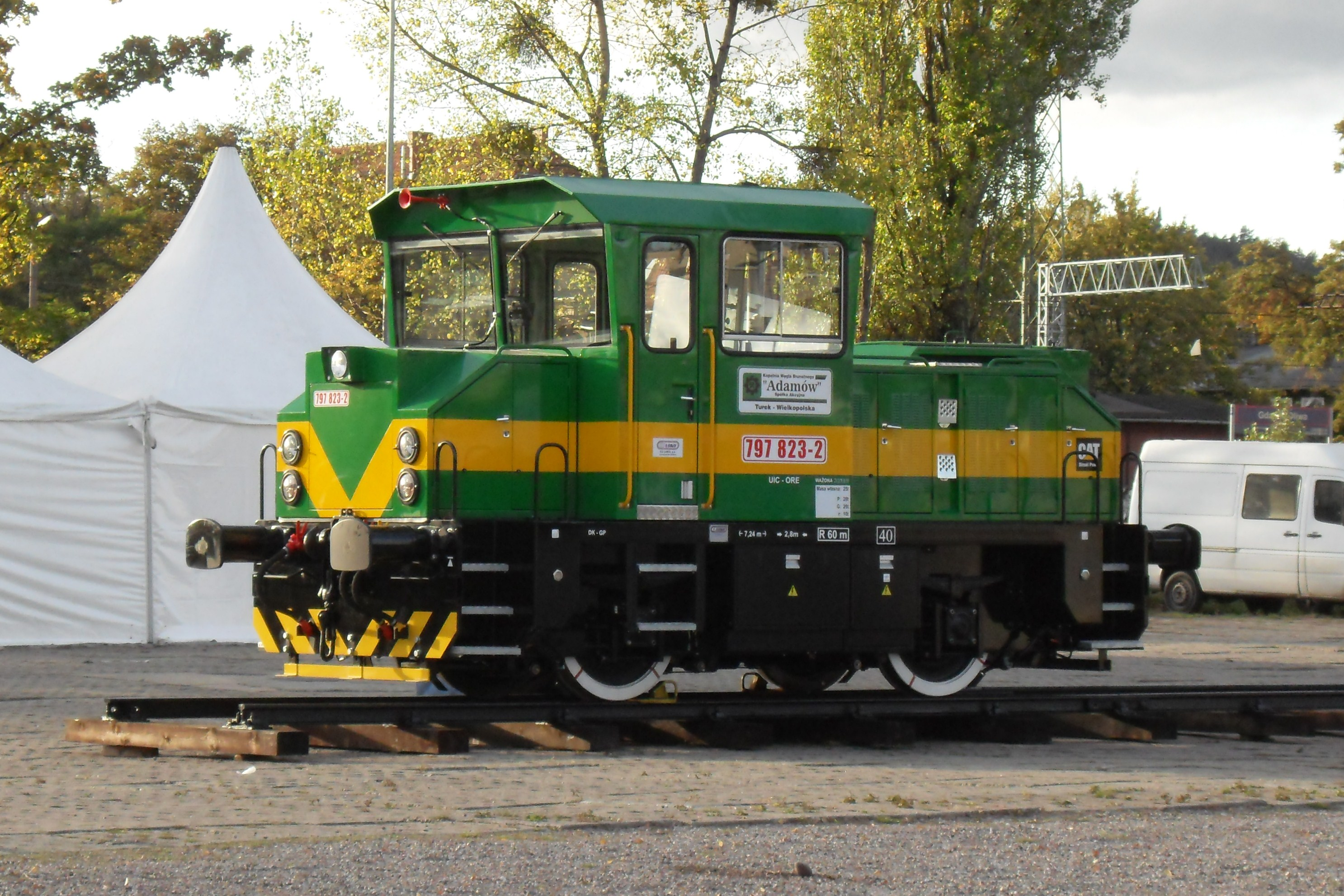
797 823-2

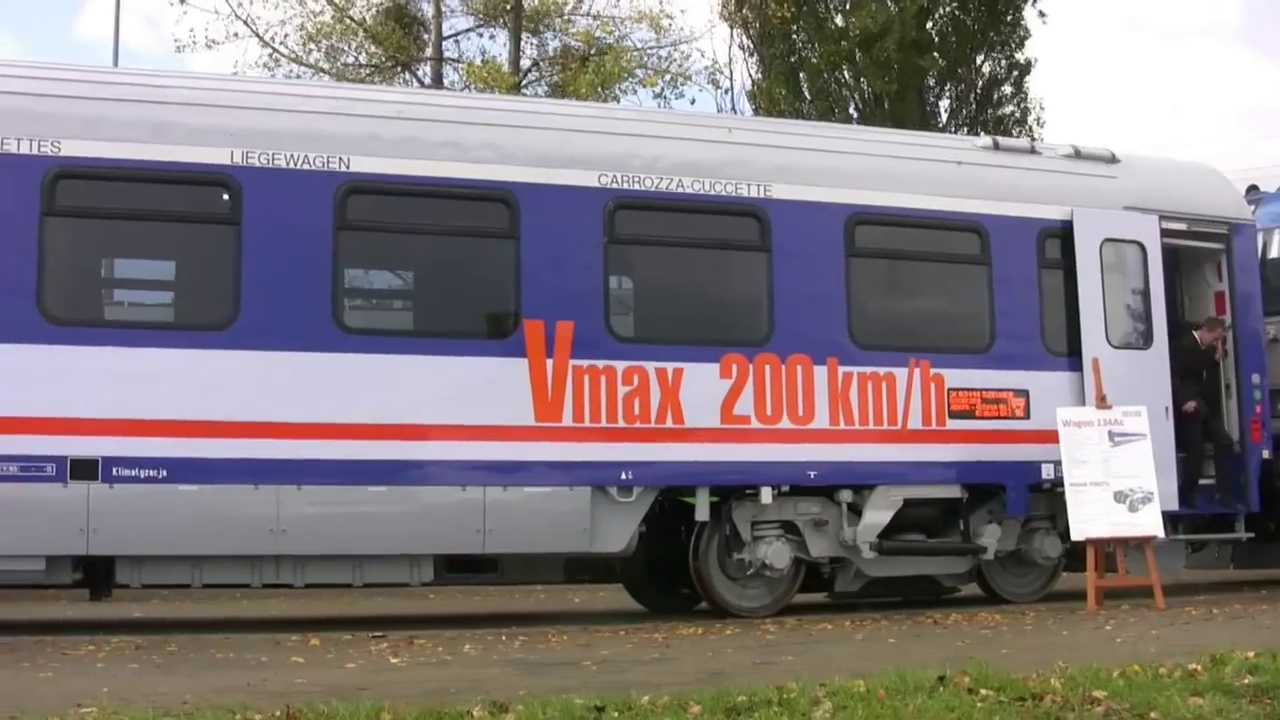
134Ac

=== 2013 ===
The 10th Trako International Railway Fair was held from 24 to 27 September 2013. For the first time, it was hosted at the AmberExpo centre near Gdańsk Stadium in Letnica district. Over 500 exhibitors participated, primarily from Poland, Germany, Czech Republic, and United Kingdom. Half were returning exhibitors, and half were debuting. The fair covered all transport-related sectors: services, manufacturing, trade, logistics, and finance, with participation from industry organizations and research institutes.

The day before the fair, conferences on Track and Vehicle Condition Monitoring Systems and Certification of Subsystems, Products, and Economic Entities in Rail Transport were held. The event was officially opened by Deputy Minister of Transport Andrzej Massel. Various conferences, seminars, presentations, meetings, and debates took place over the following days. Several agreements were signed, including a cooperation deal between PKP Polskie Linie Kolejowe and DB Netz for developing the Szczecin Główny–Berlin Hauptbahnhof connection, and contracts by Pesa with Niederbarnimer Eisenbahn for nine Link diesel multiple units, with ZKM Gdańsk for five Jazz Duo trams, and with Szybka Kolej Miejska for modernizing 21 trains. Newag signed agreements with PKP Intercity for modernizing 20 diesel locomotives and delivering 10 new locomotives.

The following competitions were judged:

- Ernest Malinowski competition for innovative railway products and technologies:
  - Rolling Stock: Pesa (award), Siemens, Knorr-Bremse, and Taps (distinctions)
  - Infrastructure: Tines (award), Track Tec (distinction)
  - Information Technologies: PKP Informatyka (award), Avista (distinction)
  - Honorary Ernests for long-term jury service: Franciszek Wielądek and Radosław Żołnierzak
- Association of Communication Engineers and Technicians of the Republic of Poland Czesław Jaworski competition for electric traction solutions: Medcom (main award), Strunobet-Migacz, Enika, and Kuca (distinctions)
- Chamber of Urban Transport Jan Podoski competition for urban transport innovations:
  - Railway Rolling Stock: Solaris Bus & Coach (medal)
  - Components and Equipment: Medcom (medal), Modertrans Poznań (distinction)
  - Track Infrastructure: Transcomfort (medal)
  - Other: Novamedia Innovision (medal), Polgrad (distinction)
- Association of Polish Electrical Engineers President's medal for Polish electrical products: Protektel and Solaris

The outdoor exhibition was relocated to the area adjacent to AmberExpo. Some vehicles were displayed at Gdańsk Stadion Expo railway station, others on a city-side parking lot. Displayed vehicles included:

- H. Cegielski – Rail Vehicles Factory: 166A
- Newag: 31WE-005 Impuls
- Newag Gliwice: E4MSU-001 Griffin
- Pesa: 111Ed-001 Gama (Malinowski award), EN62-001 Elf, SA139-002 Link, DB 600-003 Link
- PKP Cargo: ST48-002
- PKP Intercity: ED250-001 Pendolino, 111Arow, 113Aa, 156A, 168A
- Siemens: 5 170 037-3 Vectron (Malinowski distinction)
- Solaris: S109j Tramino (Chamber of Urban Transport medal)
- Voith: Gravita 15 BB
- Vossloh: G 6
Stands at Trako 2013
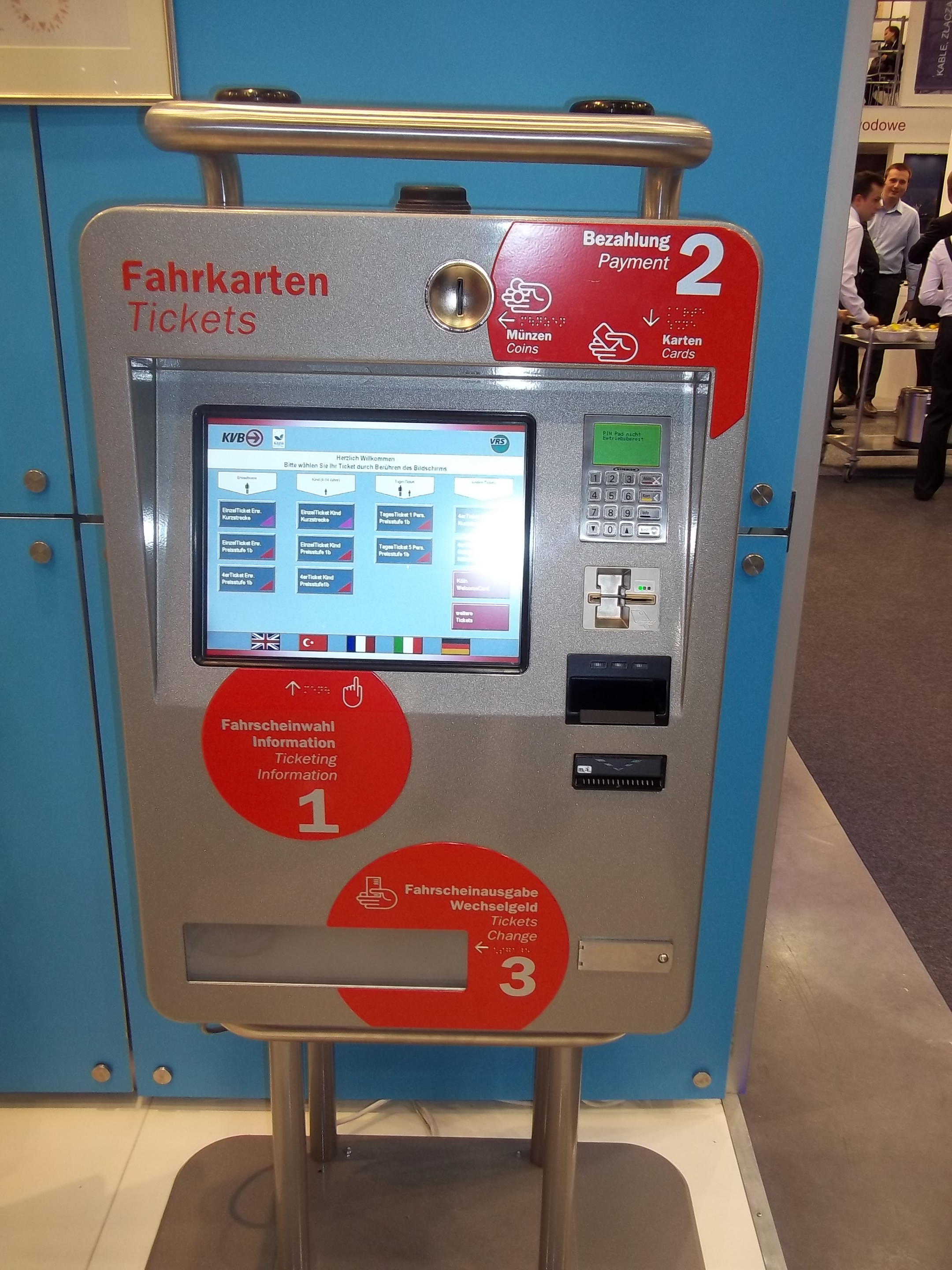
Avista ticket machine

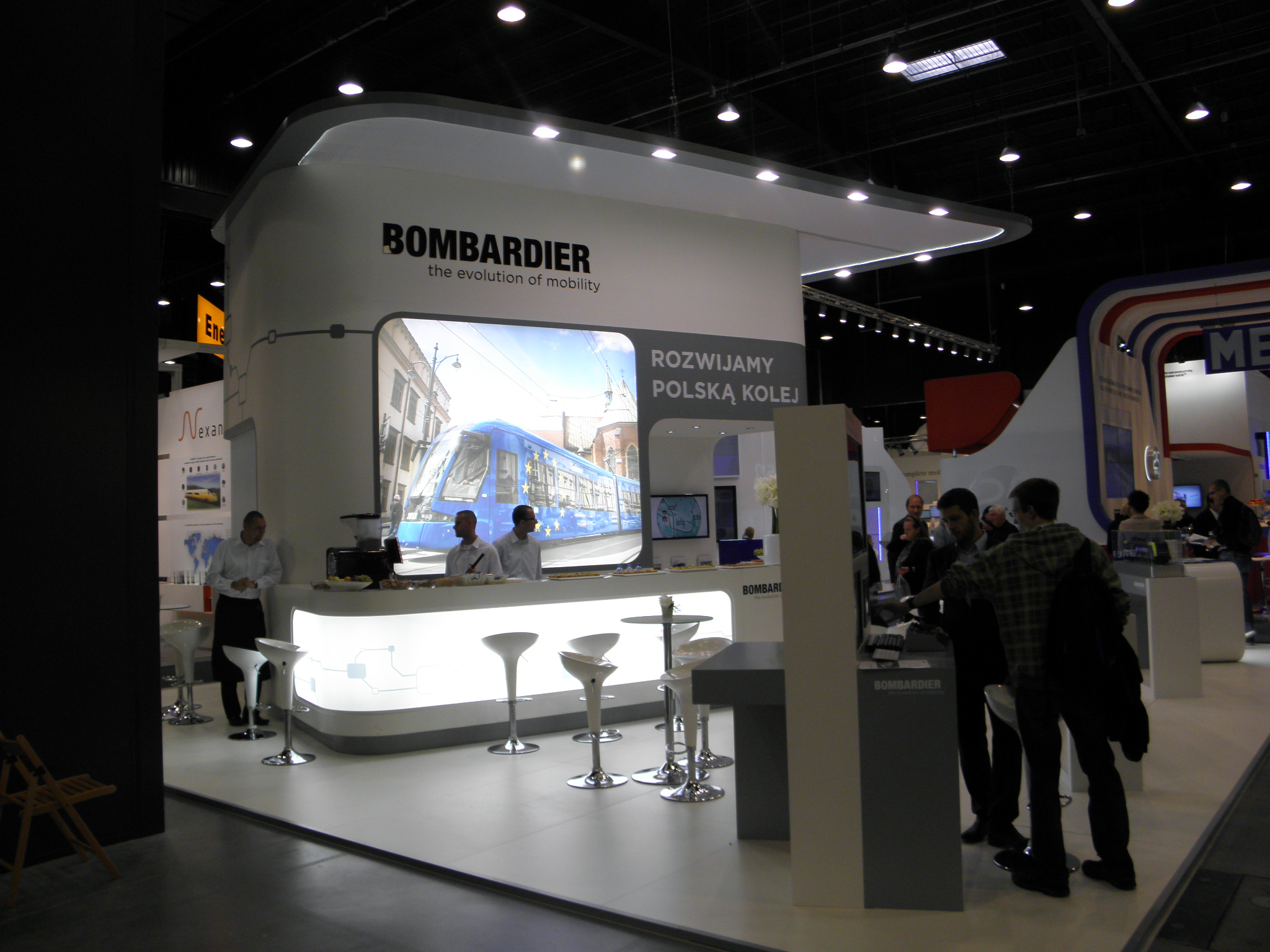
Bombardier stand

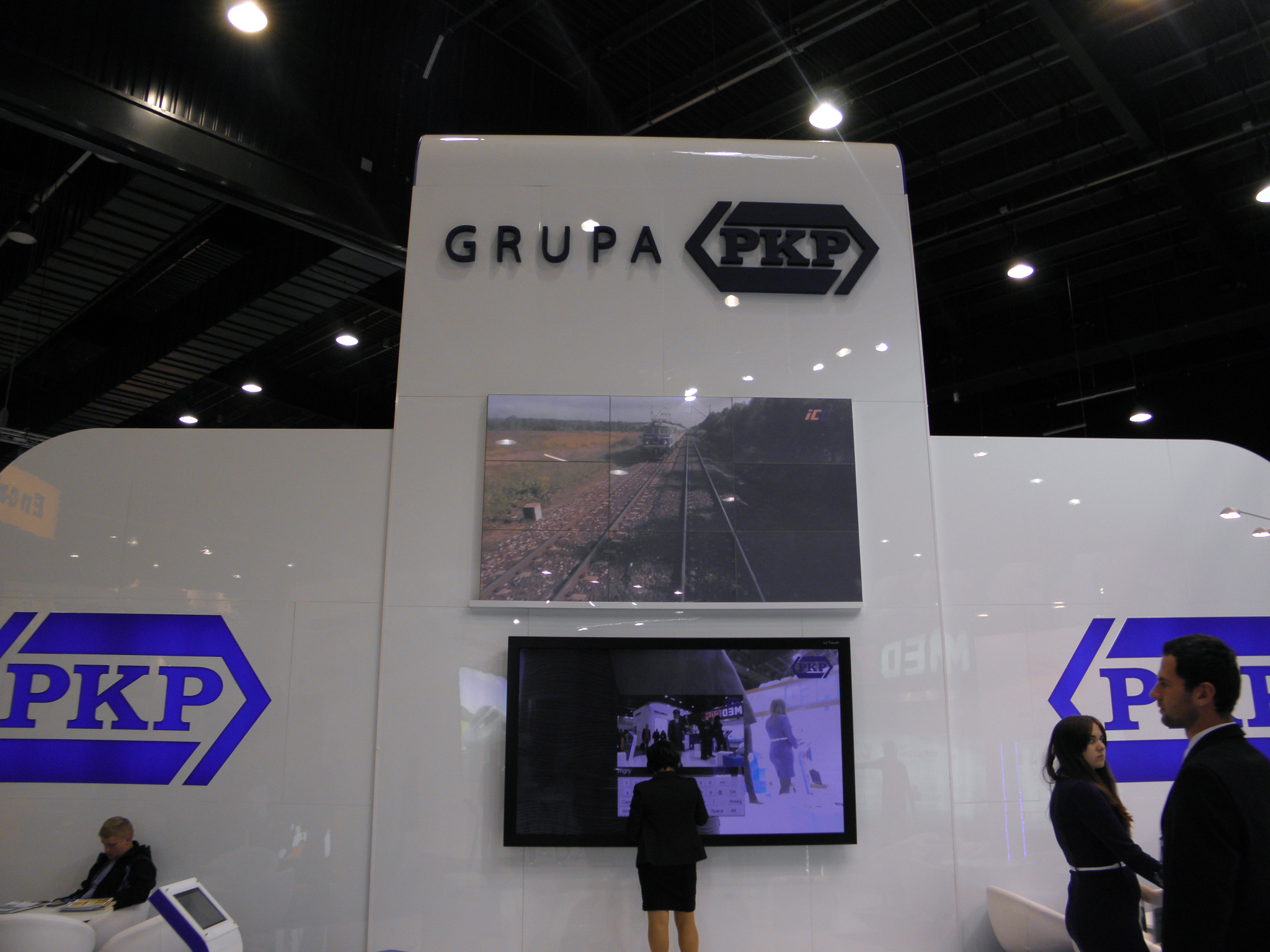
PKP Group stand

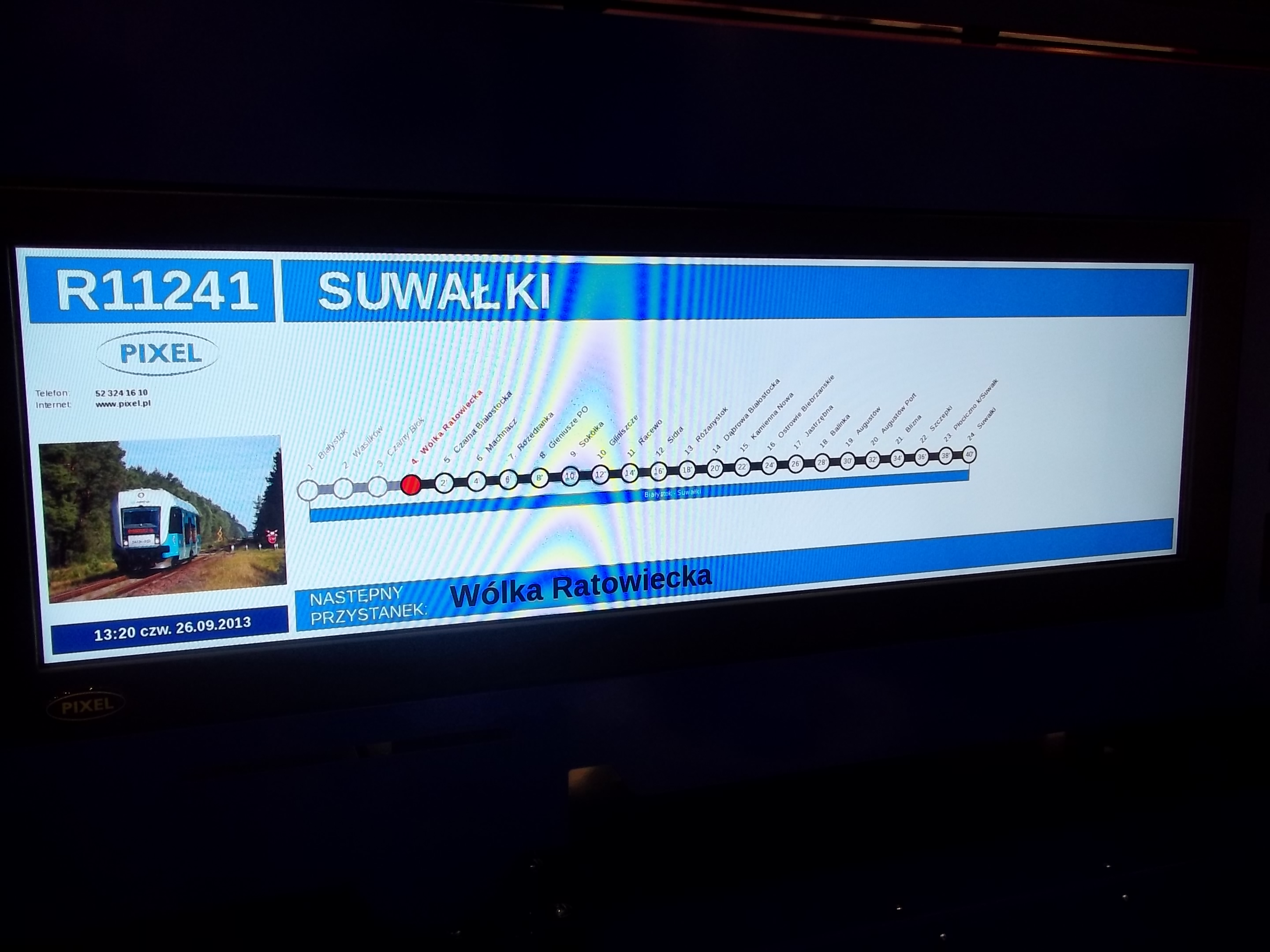
Pixel information monitor

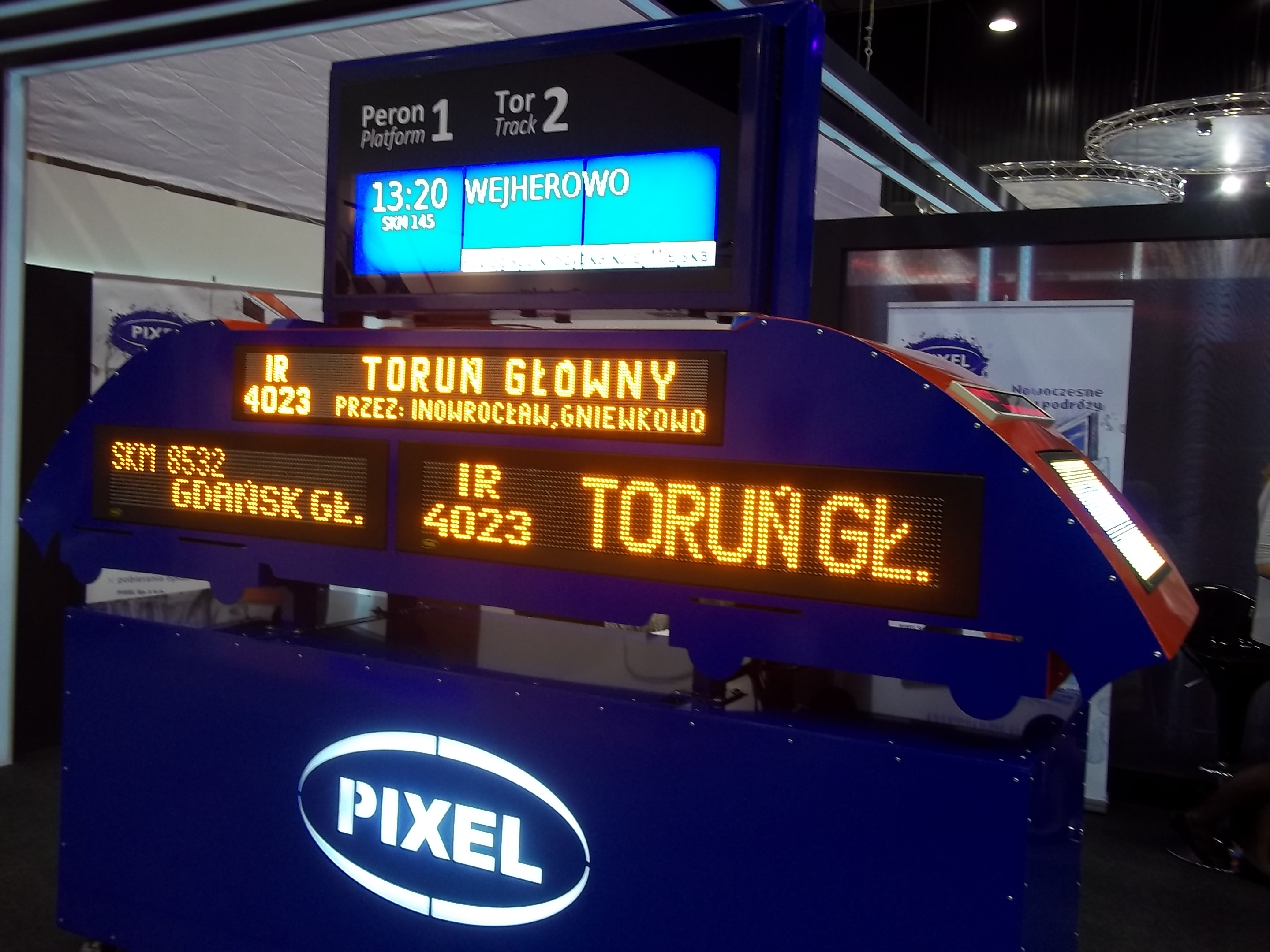
Pixel information display

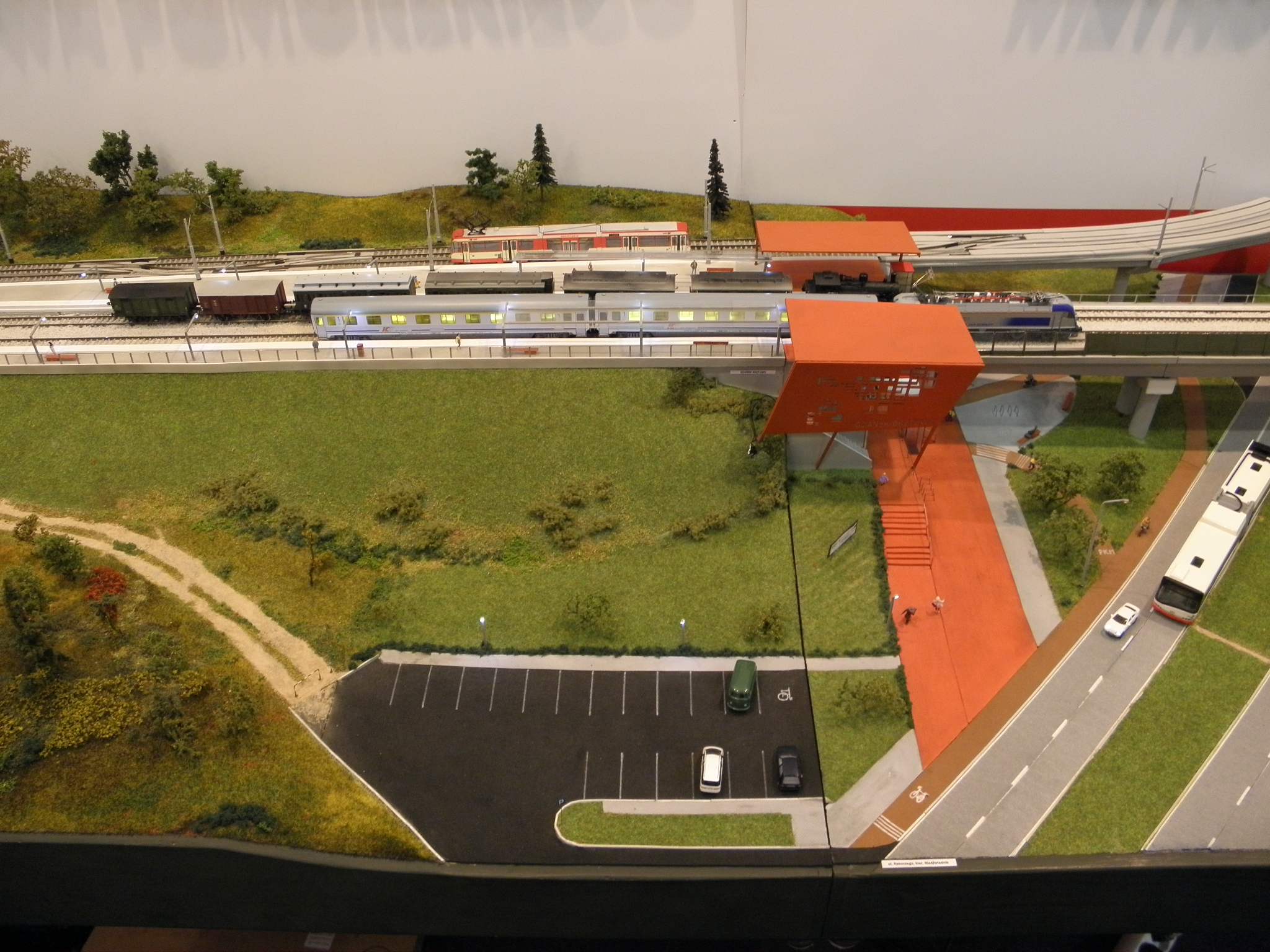
Gdańsk Wrzeszcz–Gdańsk Osowa railway model

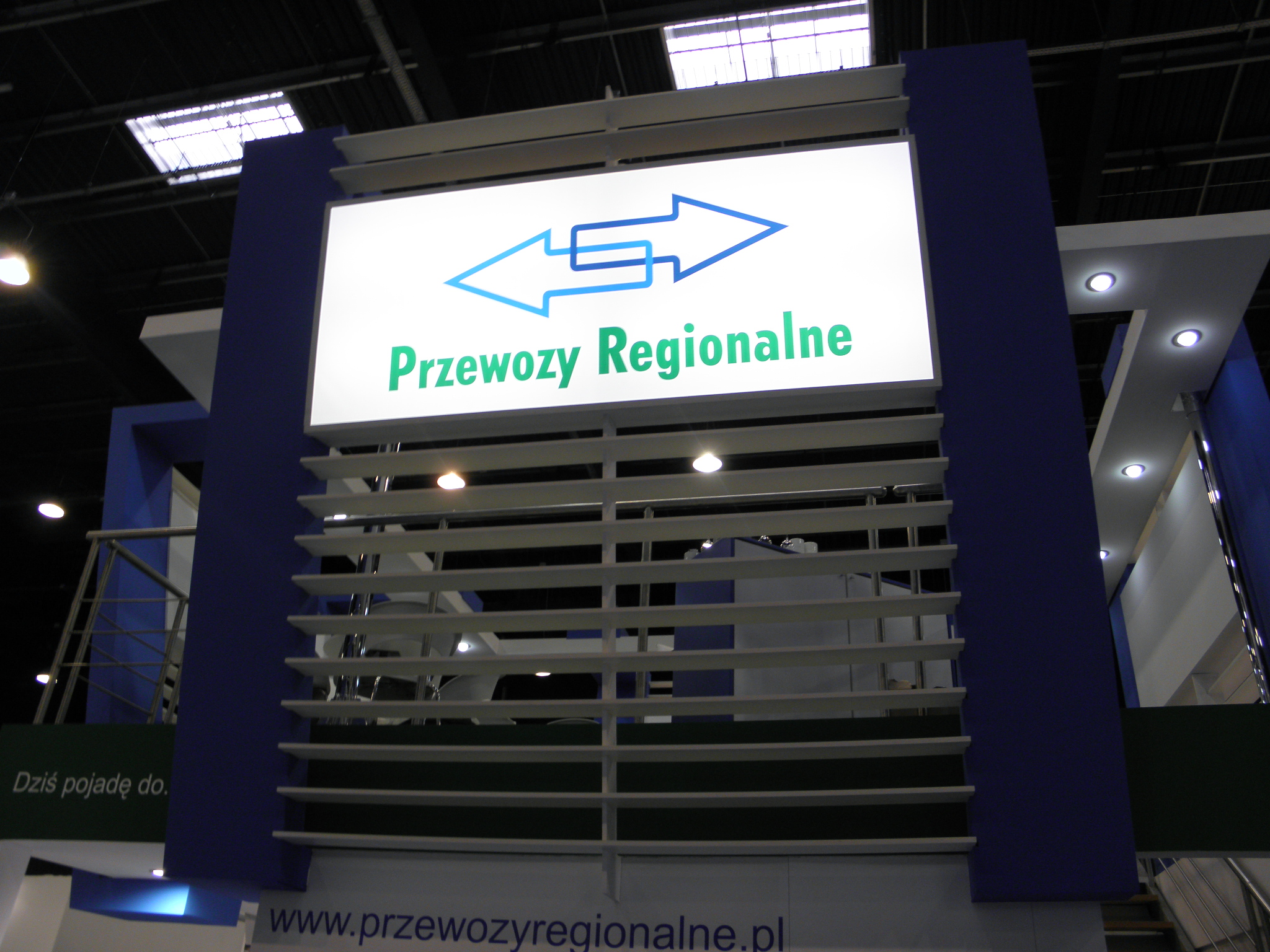
Przewozy Regionalne stand

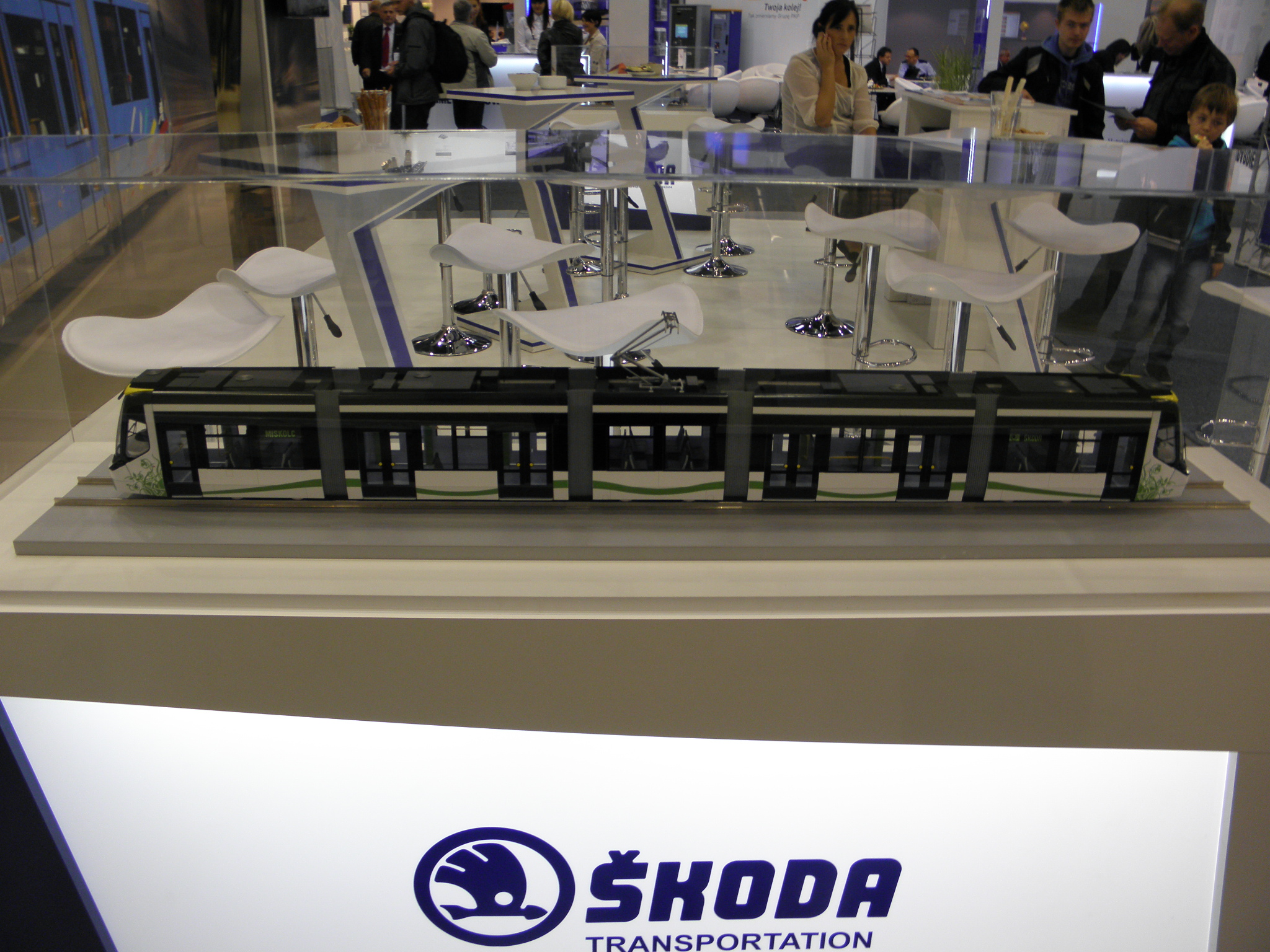
Škoda tram model

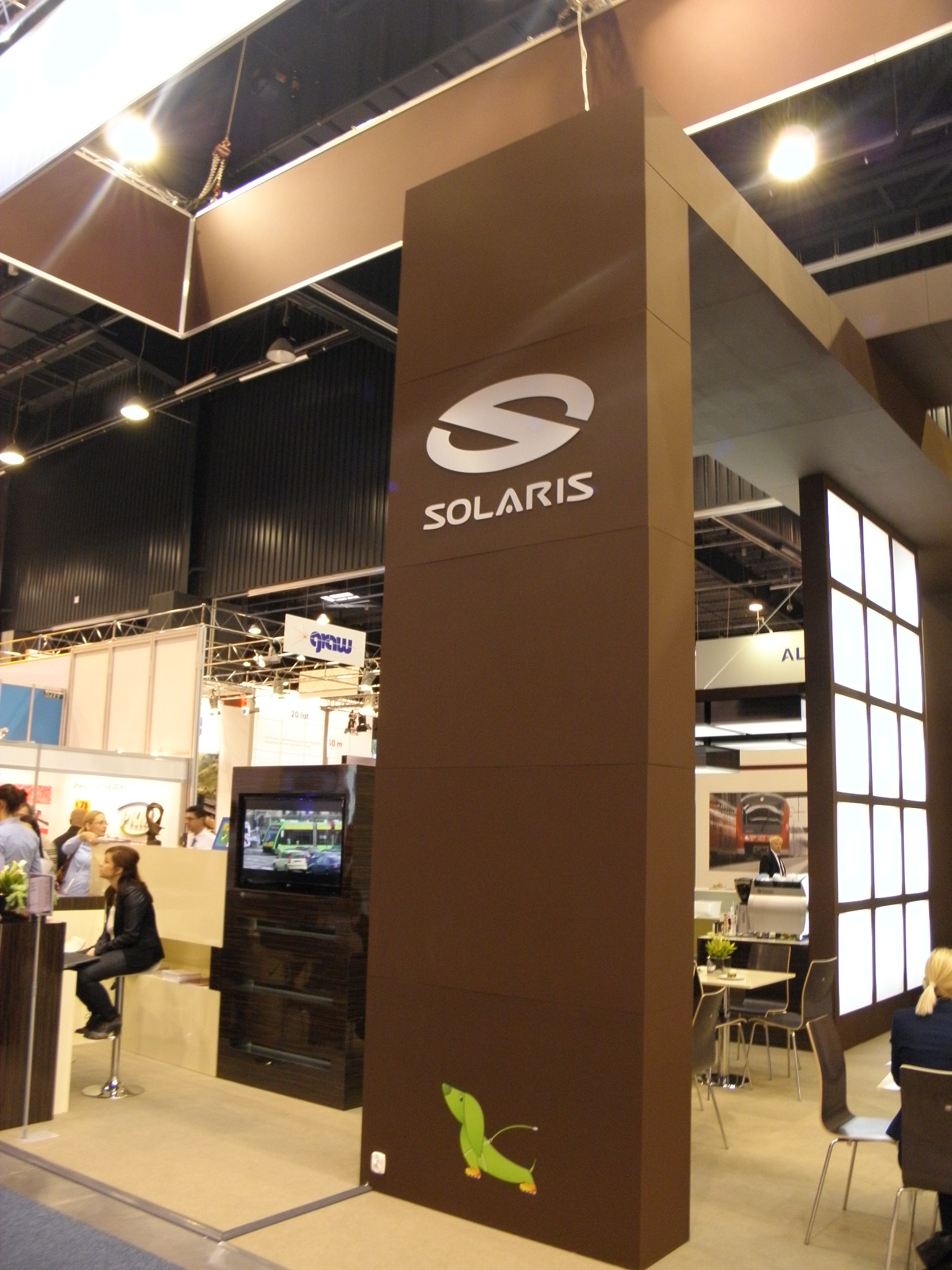
Solaris stand

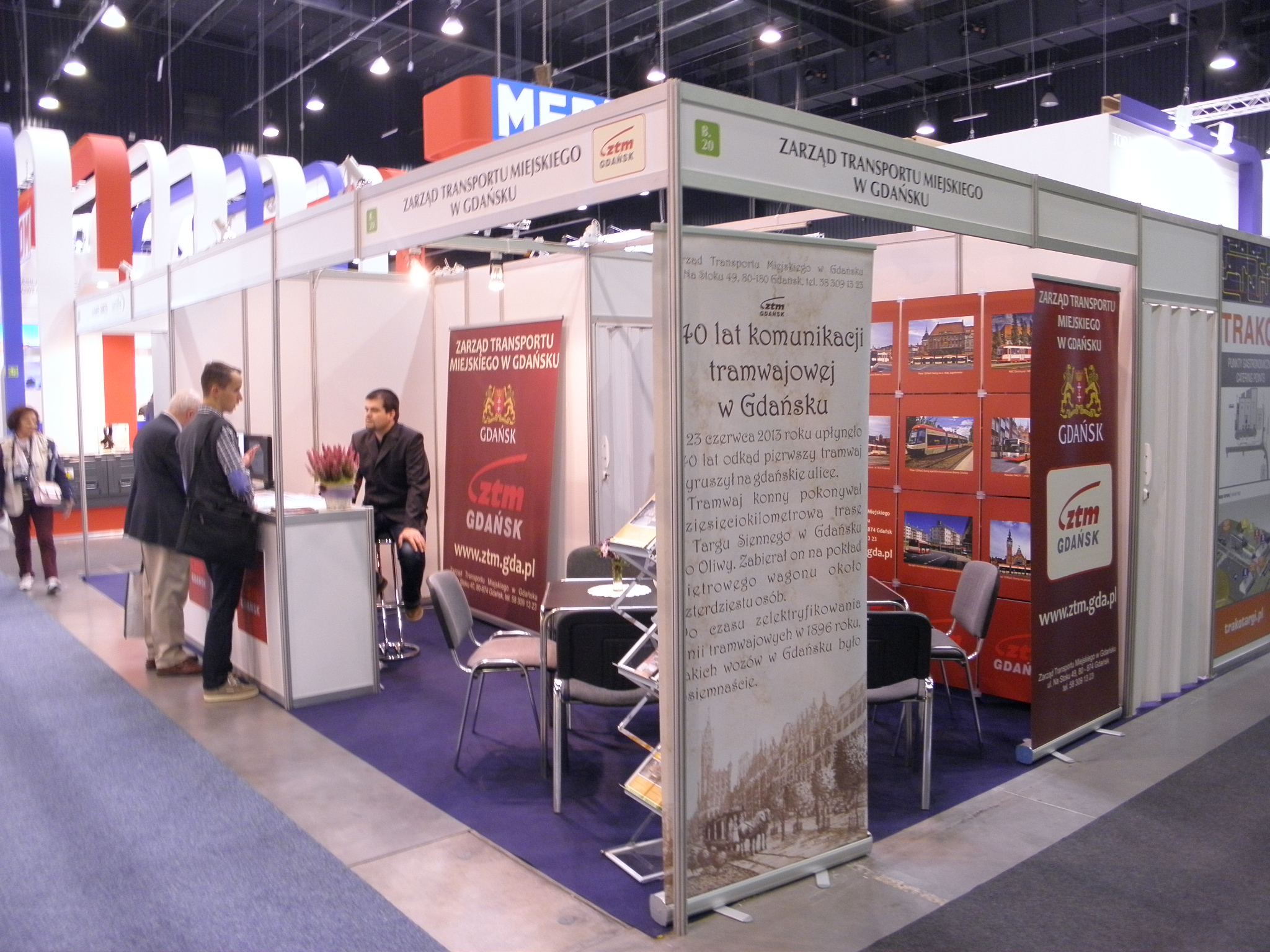
ZTM Gdańsk stand
Rolling stock at Trako 2013
Exhibit layout on track B, days I and II

Exhibit layout on track B, days III and IV

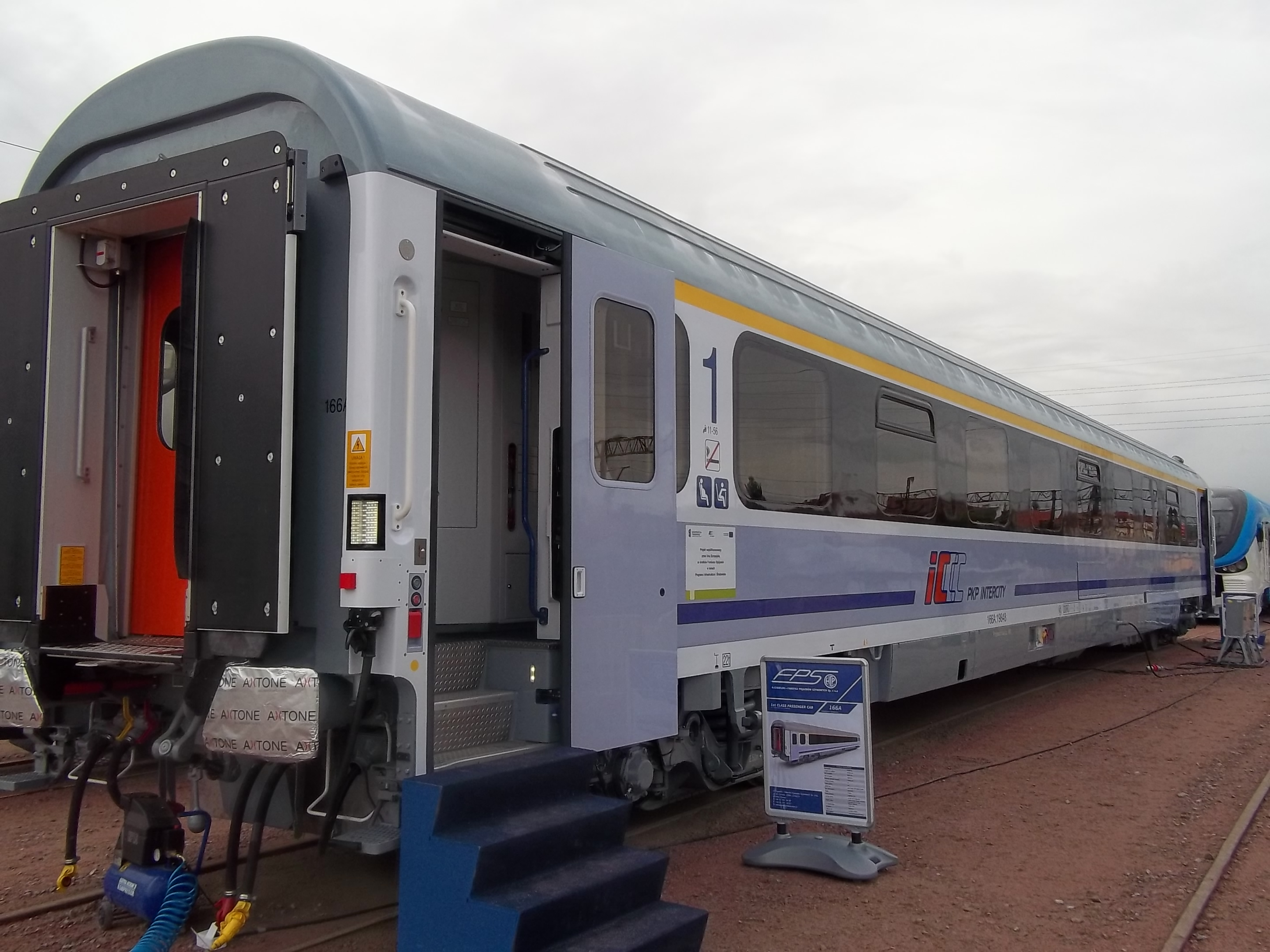
166A

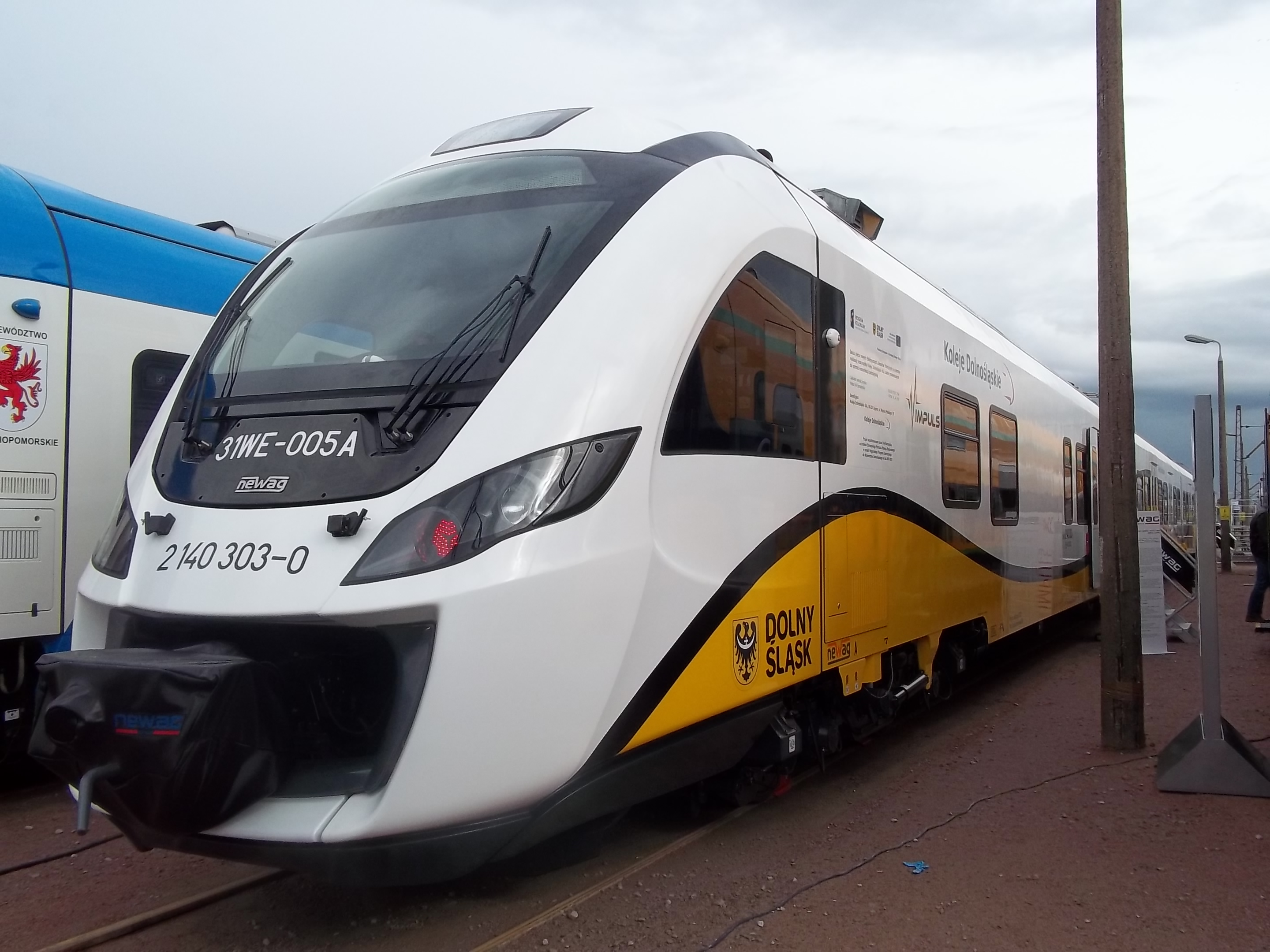
31WE-005 Impuls

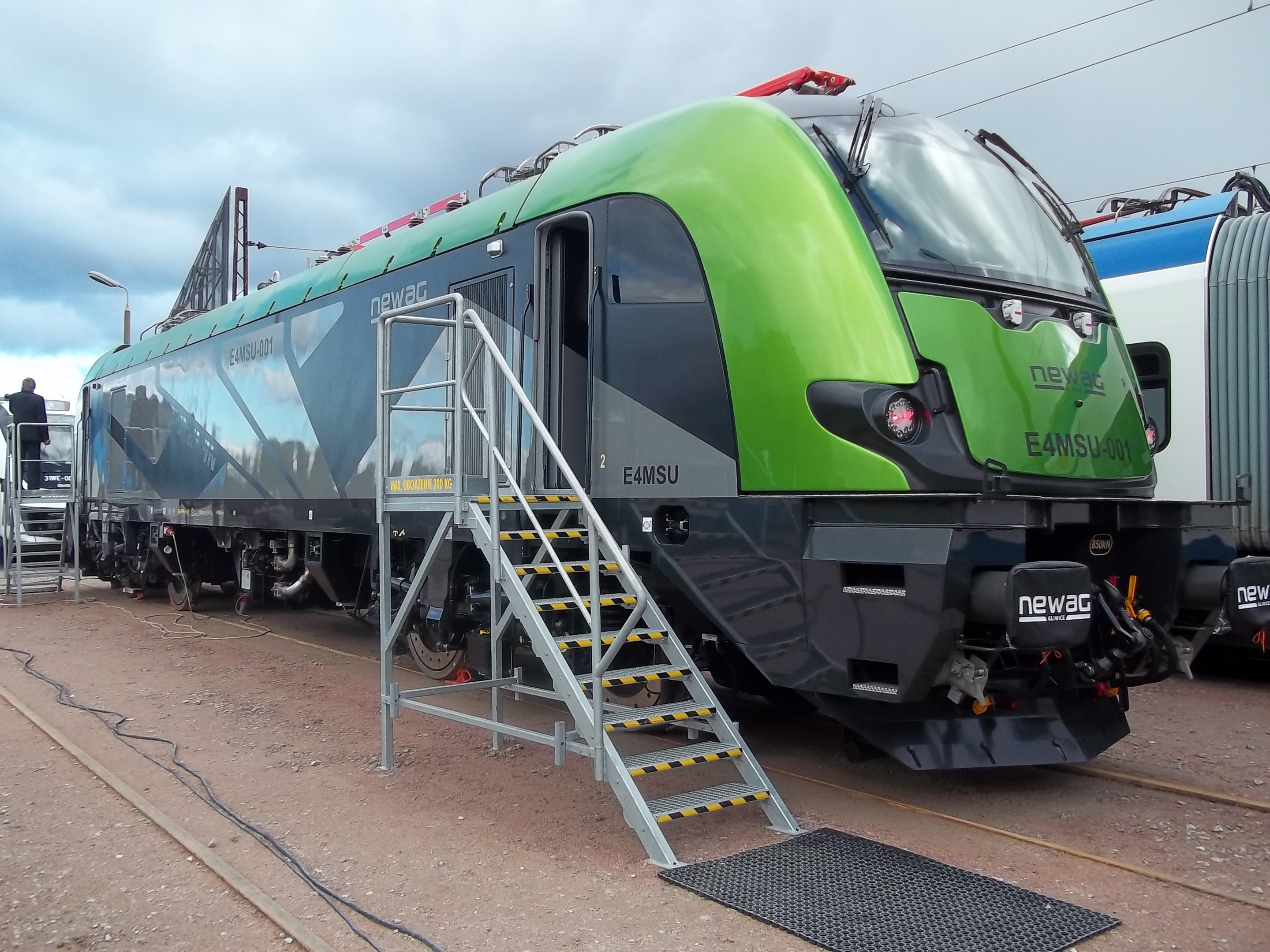
E4MSU-001 Griffin

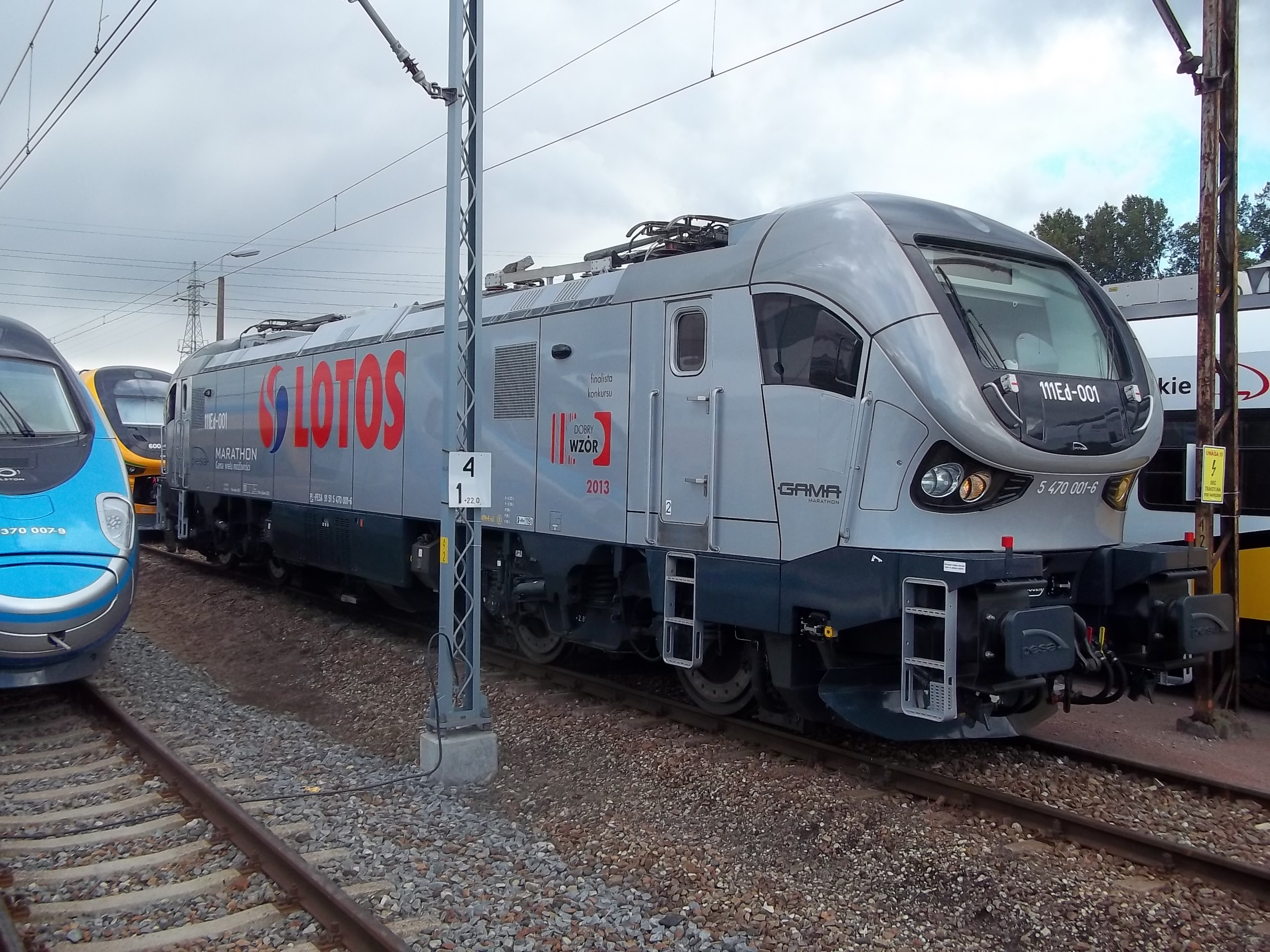
111Ed-001 Gama

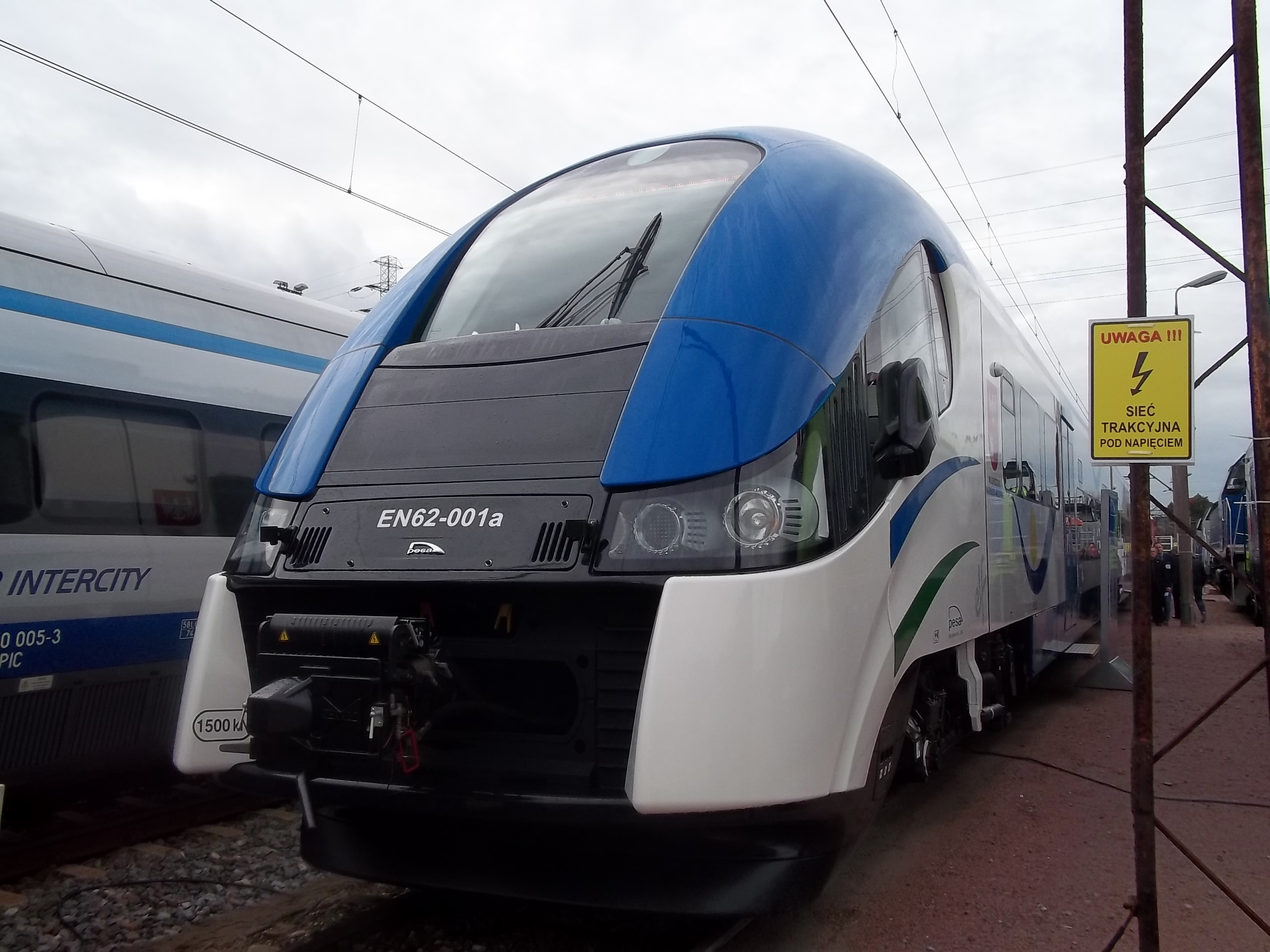
EN62-001 Elf

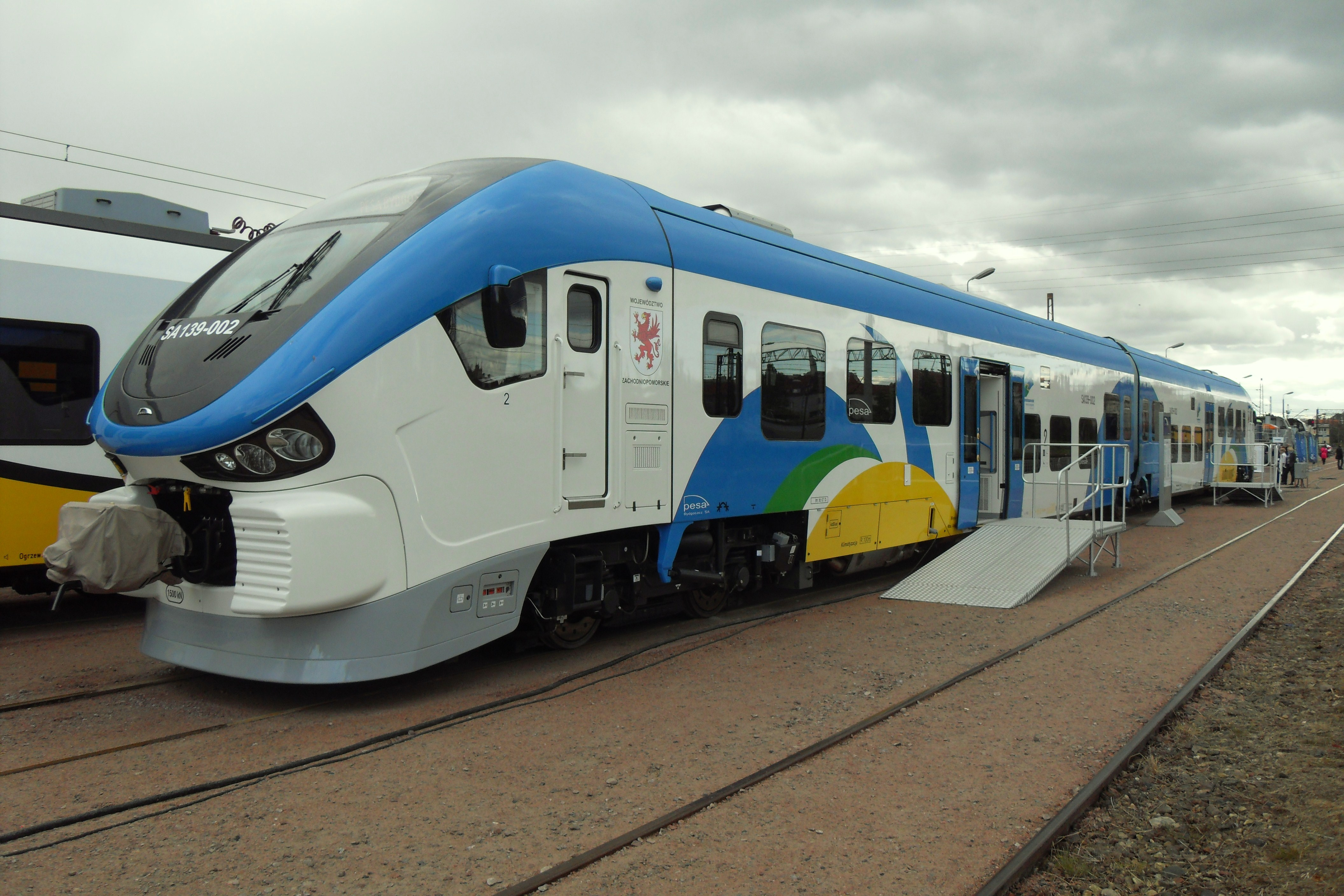
SA139-002 Link

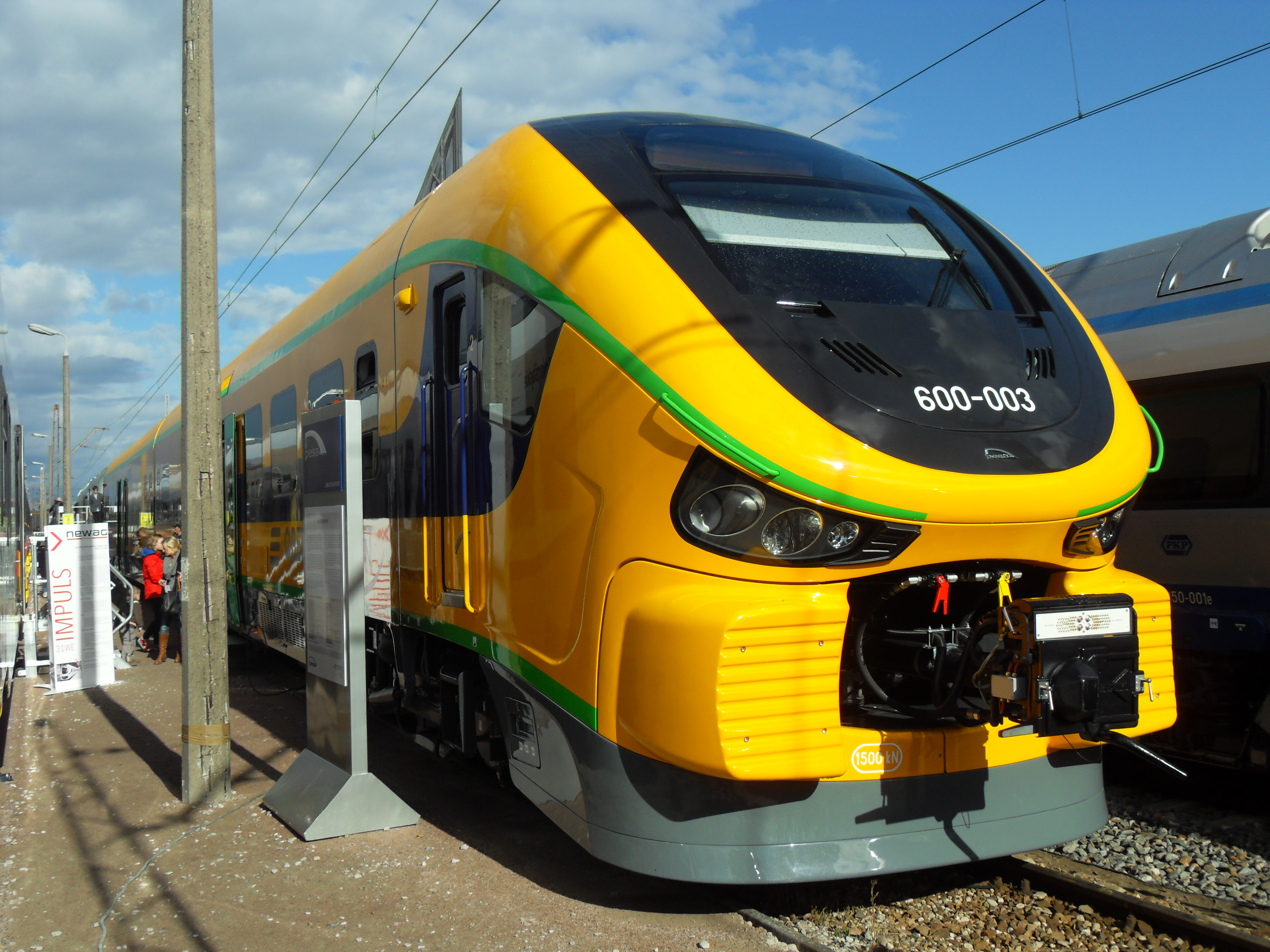
DB 600-003 Link

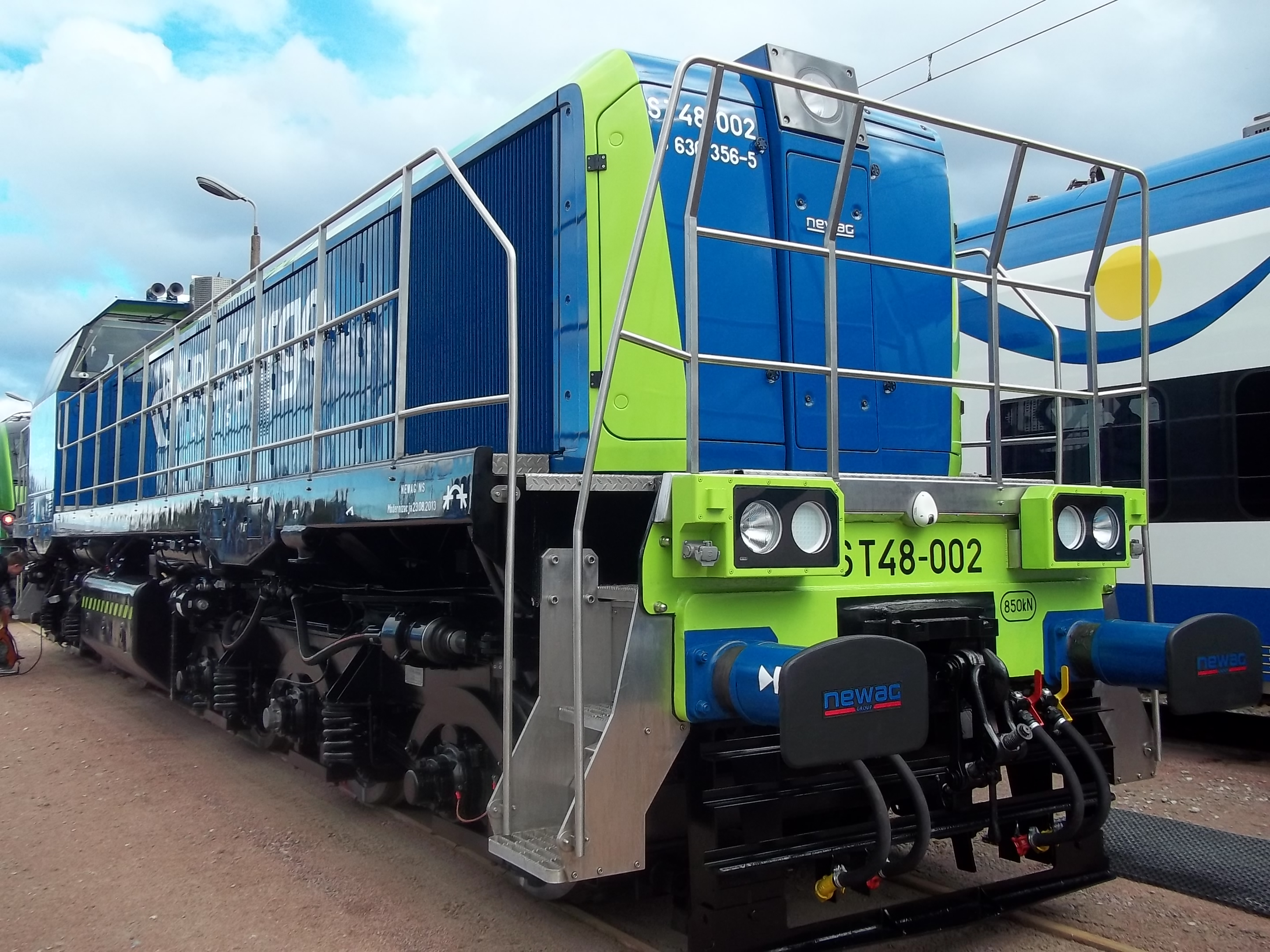
ST48-002

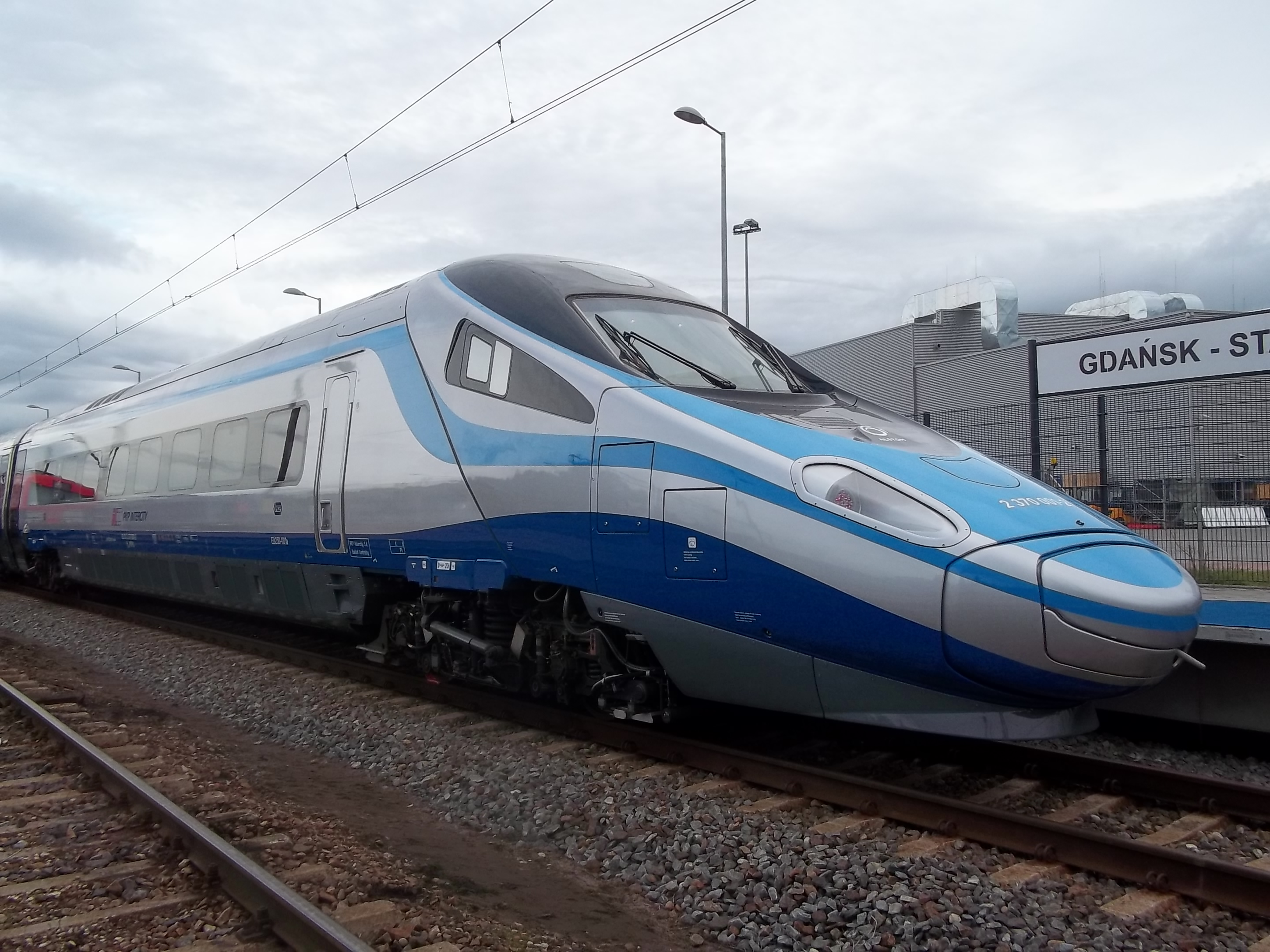
ED250-001 Pendolino

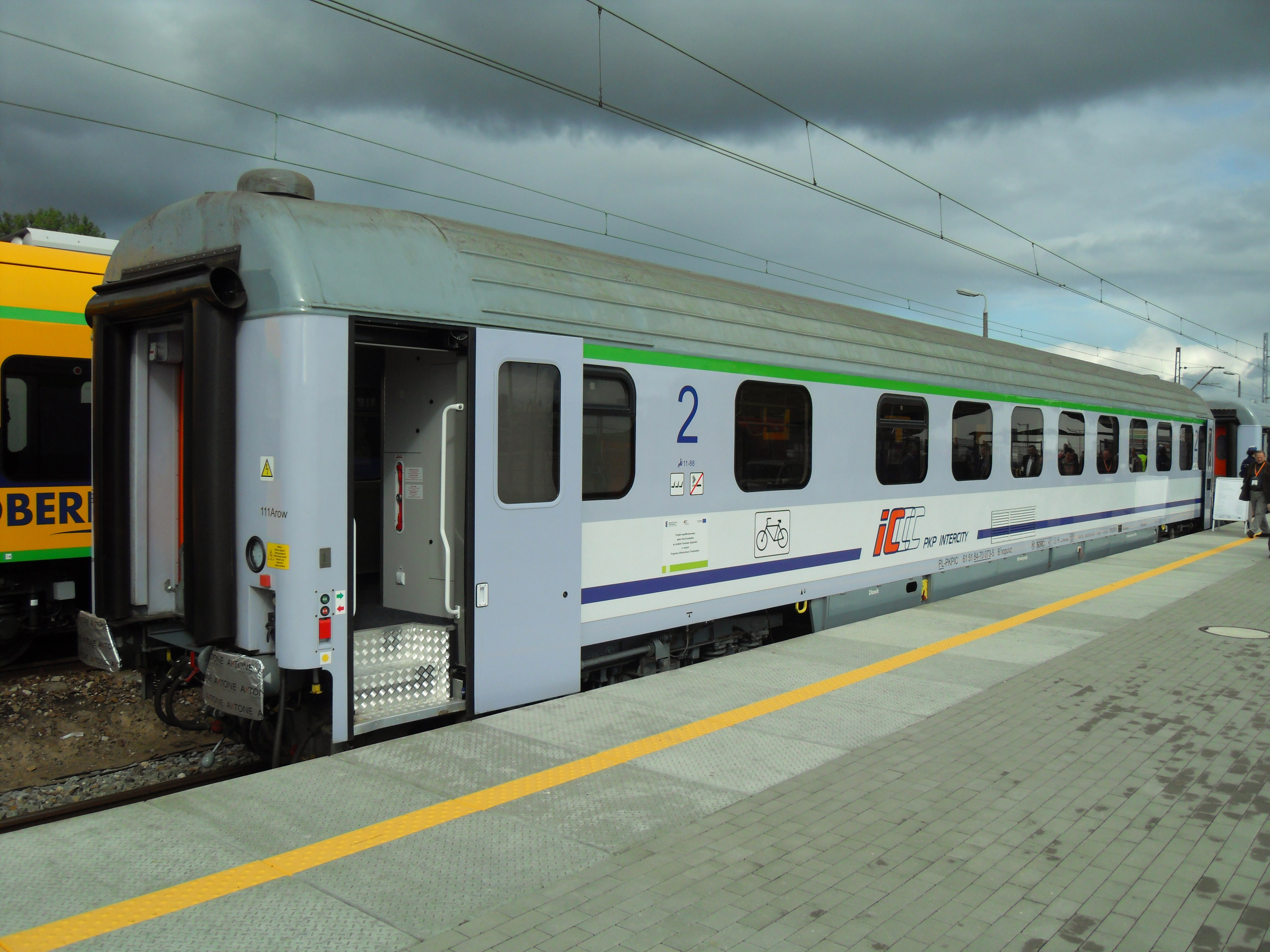
111Arow

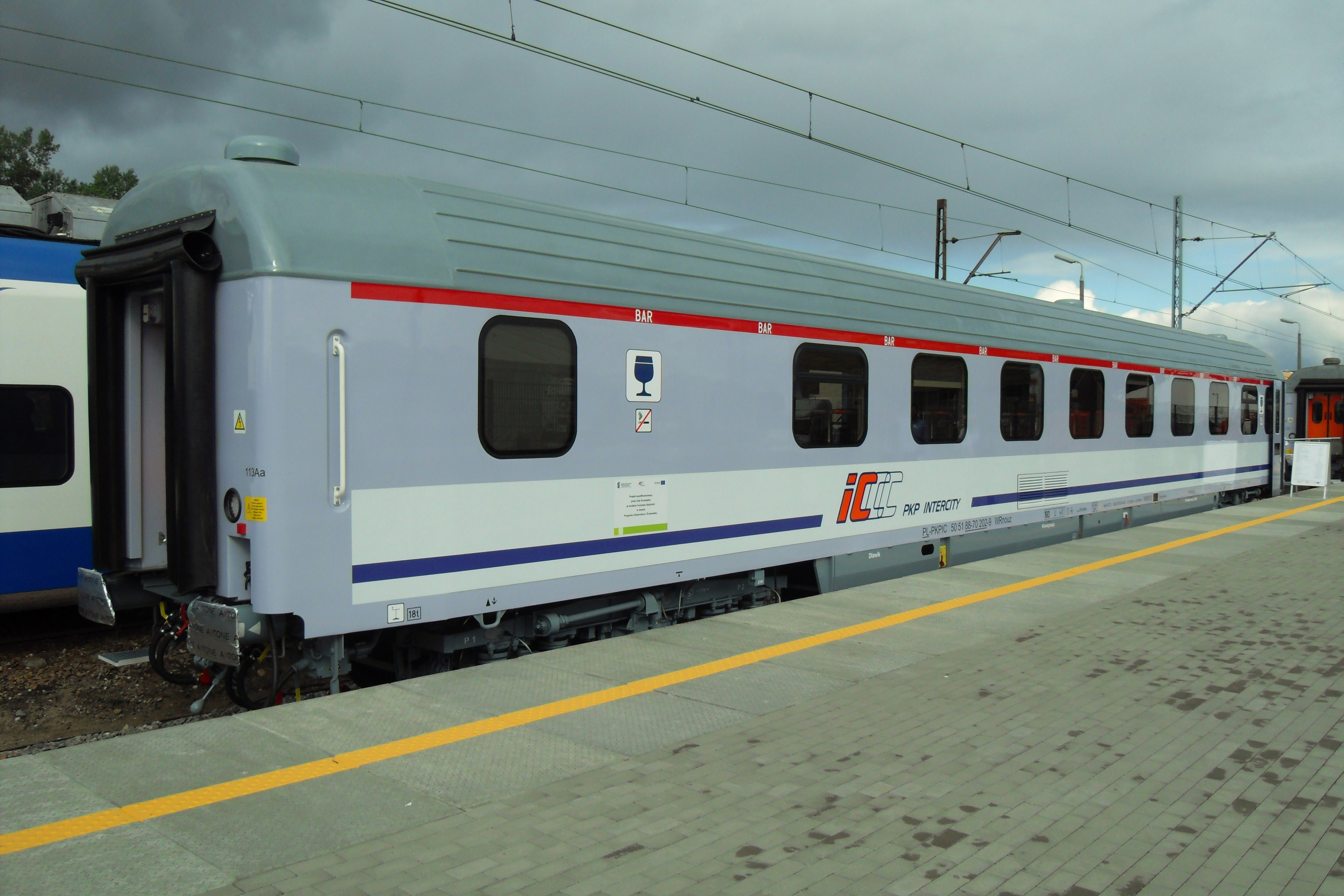
113Aa

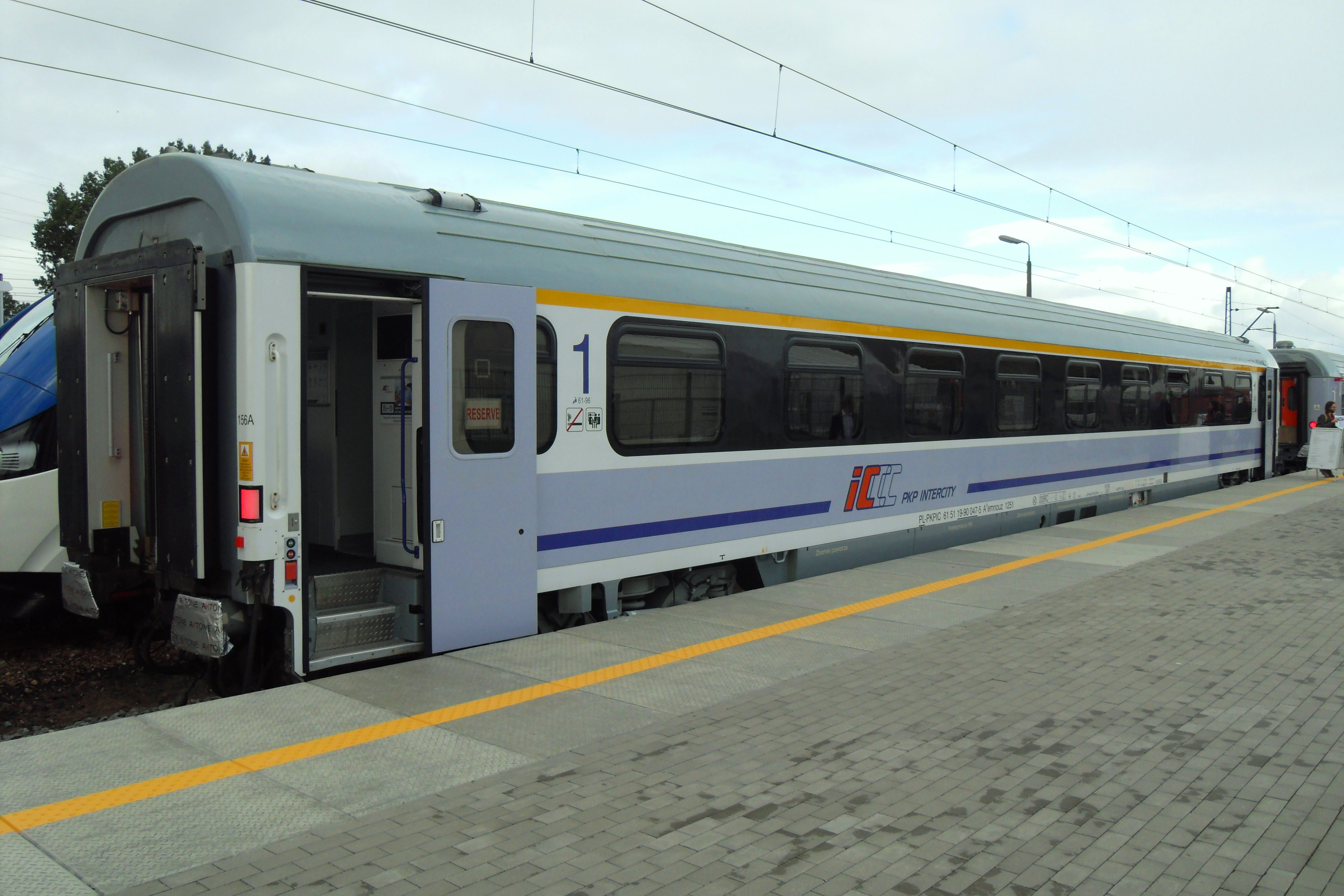
156A

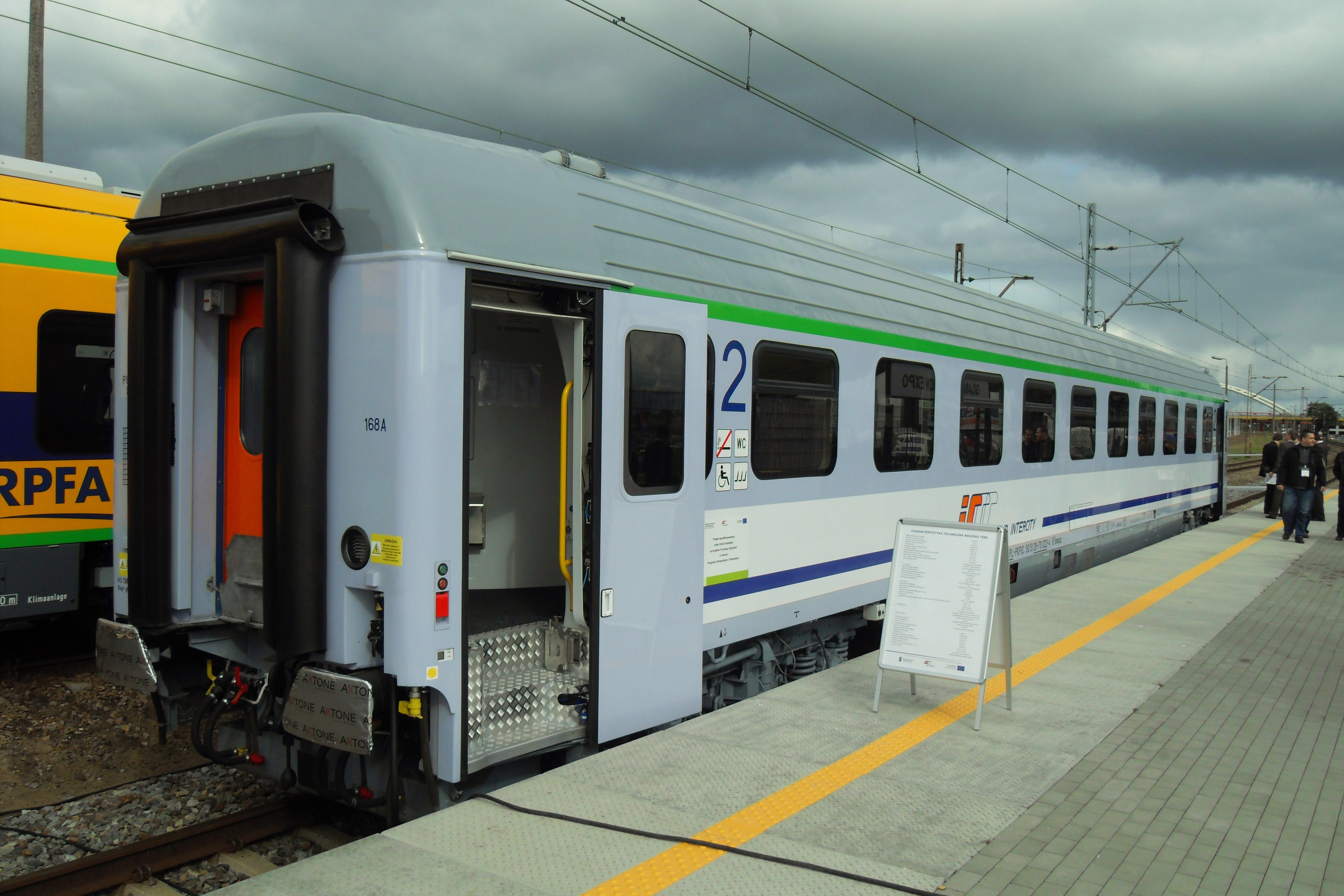
168A

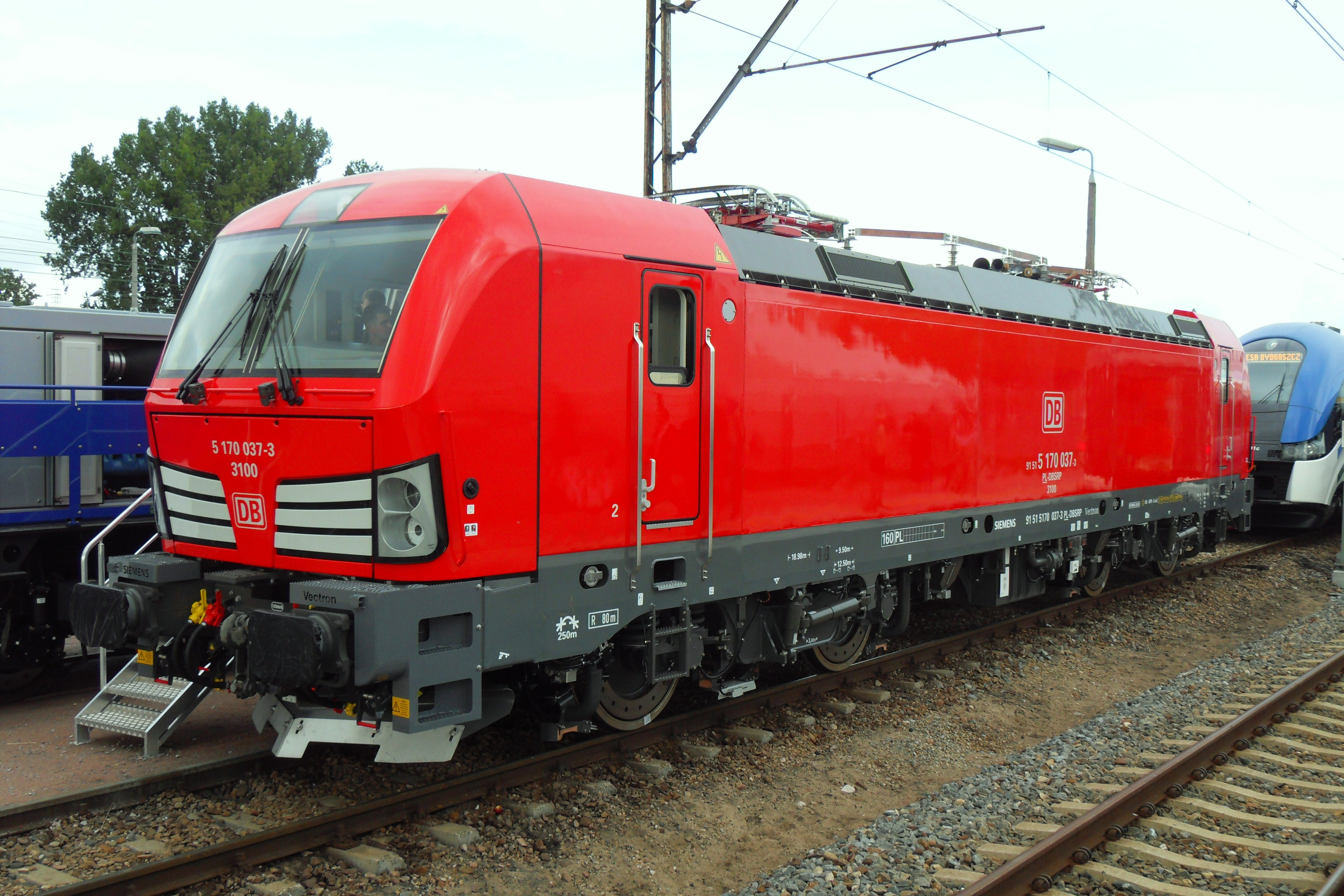
Vectron

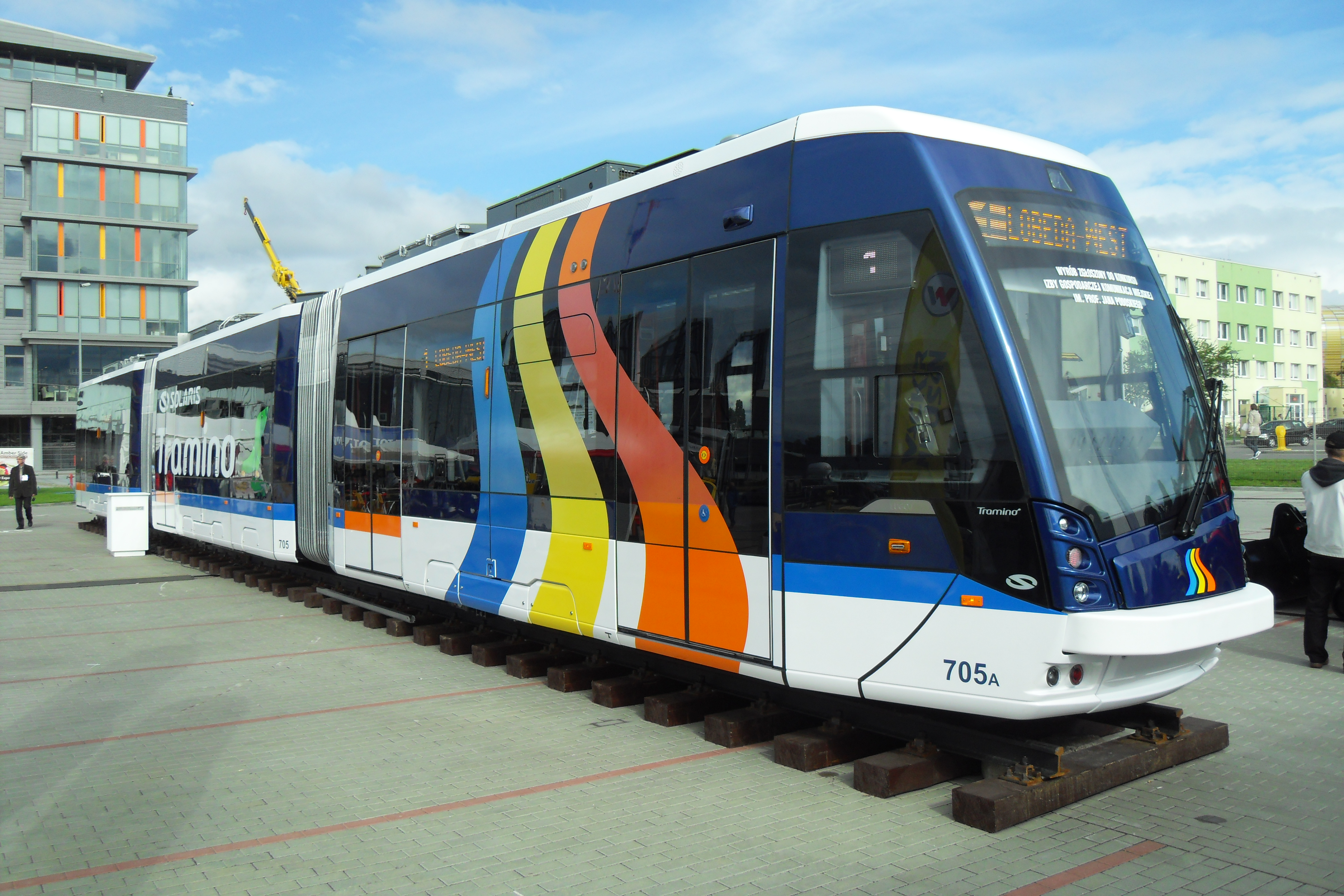
S109j Tramino

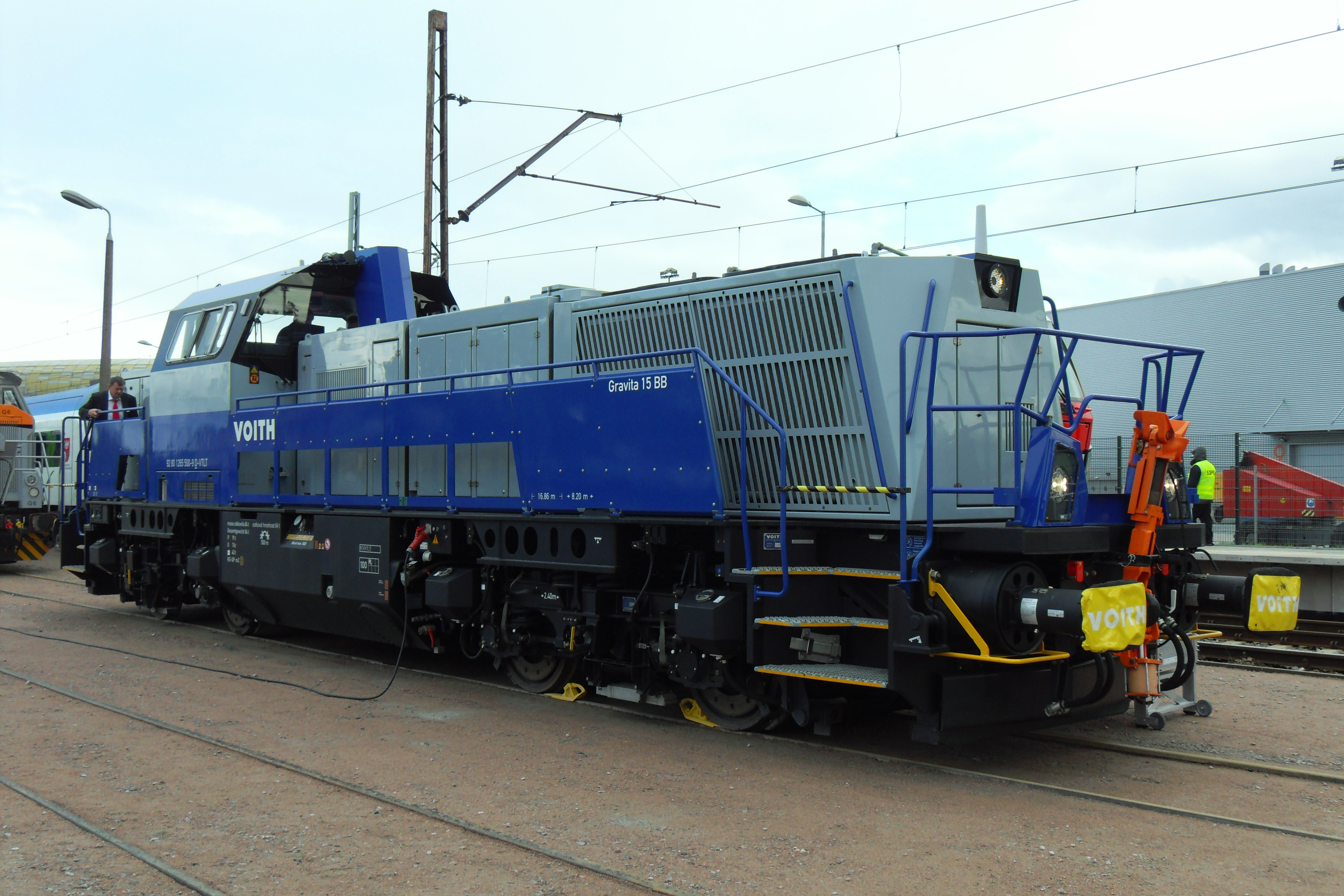
Gravita 15 BB

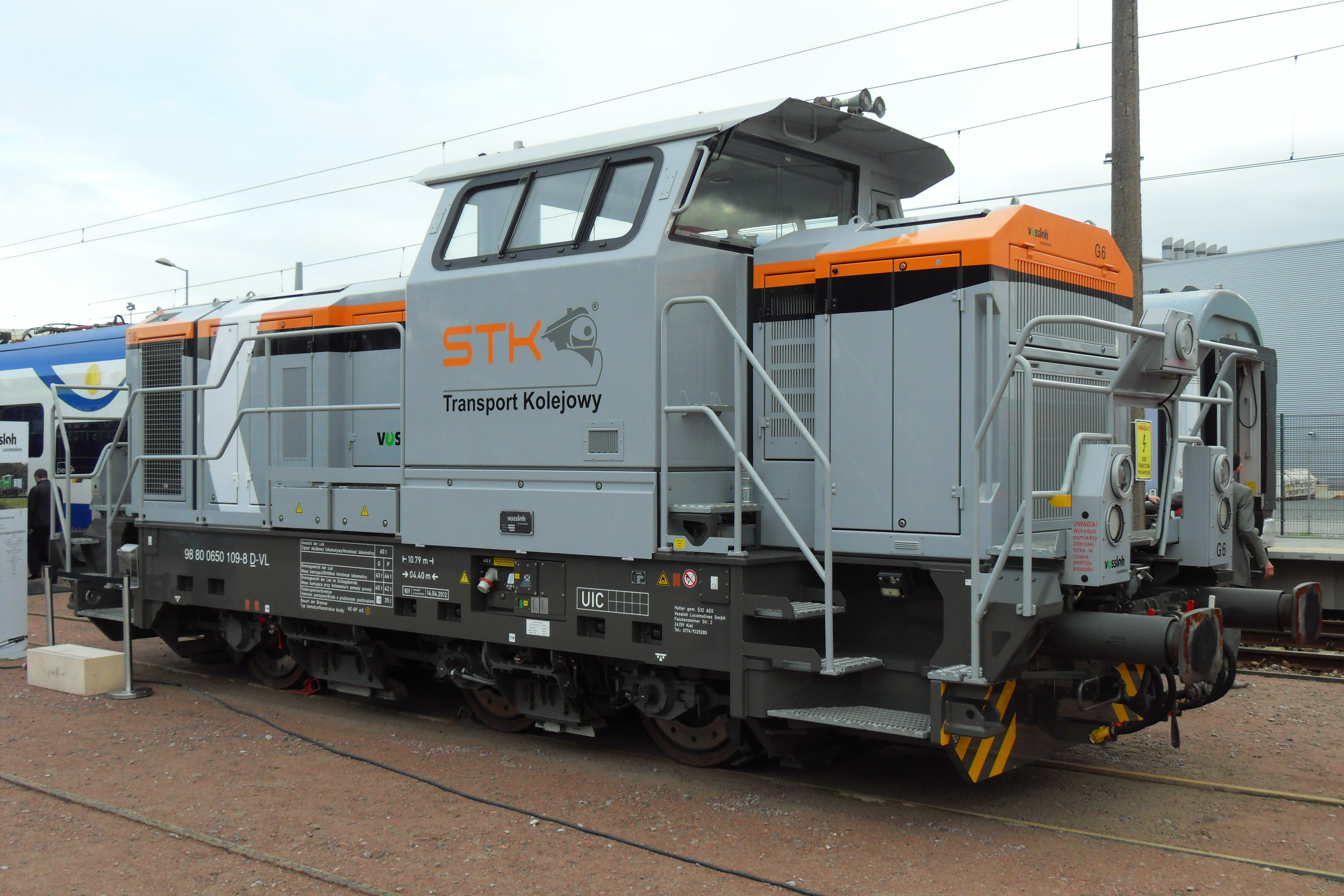
G 6

=== 2015 ===
The 11th Trako International Railway Fair was held from 22 to 25 September 2015 at AmberExpo in Gdańsk. Over 15,000 visitors attended, with more than 600 exhibitors from 20 countries, covering a 20,000 m² exhibition area and 800 meters of rolling stock tracks at Gdańsk Stadion Expo railway station. Conferences and seminars began the day before. On the first day, a modernized electric multiple unit for Polregio was showcased, and Pesa premiered its Dart. The second day featured the debut of Pesa's push-pull train. Over 30 debates were held, accompanied by the World of Small Railways exhibition. The event, under the honorary patronage of Minister Maria Wasiak, who attended on the second day, joined the European Car-Free Day campaign for the first time.

The following competitions and awards were presented:

- Józef Nowkuński competition: Łódź Agglomeration Railway (award), Pesa (distinction)
- Ernest Malinowski competition:
  - Infrastructure: Bieżanów Railway Trackworks Plant (award), Bombardier Transportation Polska, Kombud (distinctions)
  - Rolling Stock: Track Tec (award), Solaris, Enika (distinctions)
  - IT: Macro System (award), Radionika (distinction)
- Association of Communication Engineers and Technicians of the Republic of Poland Czesław Jaworski competition:
  - Infrastructure: Strunobet-Migacz (main award), Mabo (1st distinction), Pfisterer Group (2nd distinction)
  - Vehicles: Pesa (award), Solaris (1st distinction), Newag (2nd distinction), EC Engineering (3rd distinction)
- Chamber of Urban Transport Jan Podoski competition:
  - Railway Rolling Stock: Pesa (award), Solaris (distinction)
  - Components and Equipment: Macro-System Mieszko Ciepliński (award), Novamedia Innovision (distinction)
  - Track Infrastructure: M&MR Trading Polska / Transcomfort
  - Power Supply and Electrical Infrastructure: ABB
  - Other: Macro-System Mieszko Ciepliński (award), Lesser Poland Machine Factory in Brzesko (distinction)
- Association of Polish Electrical Engineers President's medal: Bitstream
- Most attractive exhibition competition:
  - Up to 30 m²: Eneria, Ster, Agat
  - Over 31 m²: Bombardier Transportation Polska, Kinex Bearings, Stadler Polska
- Socially Responsible Railway Company: Enika, PKP Energetyka, Axtone (awards), Łódź Agglomeration Railway (distinction)
- The Golden Chariot award: Maria Wasiak, Tadeusz Szozda, Mirosław Smulczyński, Track Tec

Displayed rolling stock at Gdańsk Stadion Expo railway station included:

- Crystal Traktor: 9C160 Orion
- CZ Loko: 794 001-8 EffiShunter
- DB Heavy Maintenance: Ausst
- Bieżanów Railway Trackworks Plant: Switcher
- Legios: Faccns, Zacns
- Poznań Municipal Transport Company: Carl Weyer
- Newag: E6ACT-008 Dragon, 45WE-010 Impuls
- Pesa: ATR220-026Tr Atribo (Nowkuński competition distinction), ED161-004 Dart (Association of Communication Engineers and Technicians of the Republic of Poland competition award), 111Eb-001 Gama, 416B-002 Sundeck, 134N Jazz (Podoski competition award), 2010NW Twist
- Polregio: EN57AL-2101
- Siemens: 193 820 Vectron MS
- Stadler: ED160-009 FLIRT³, L-4268-007 FLIRT³, ATR125.103 GTW
- Solaris: S111o Tramino (Malinowski, Podoski and Association of Communication Engineers and Technicians of the Republic of Poland competitions distinction)
Stands at Trako 2015
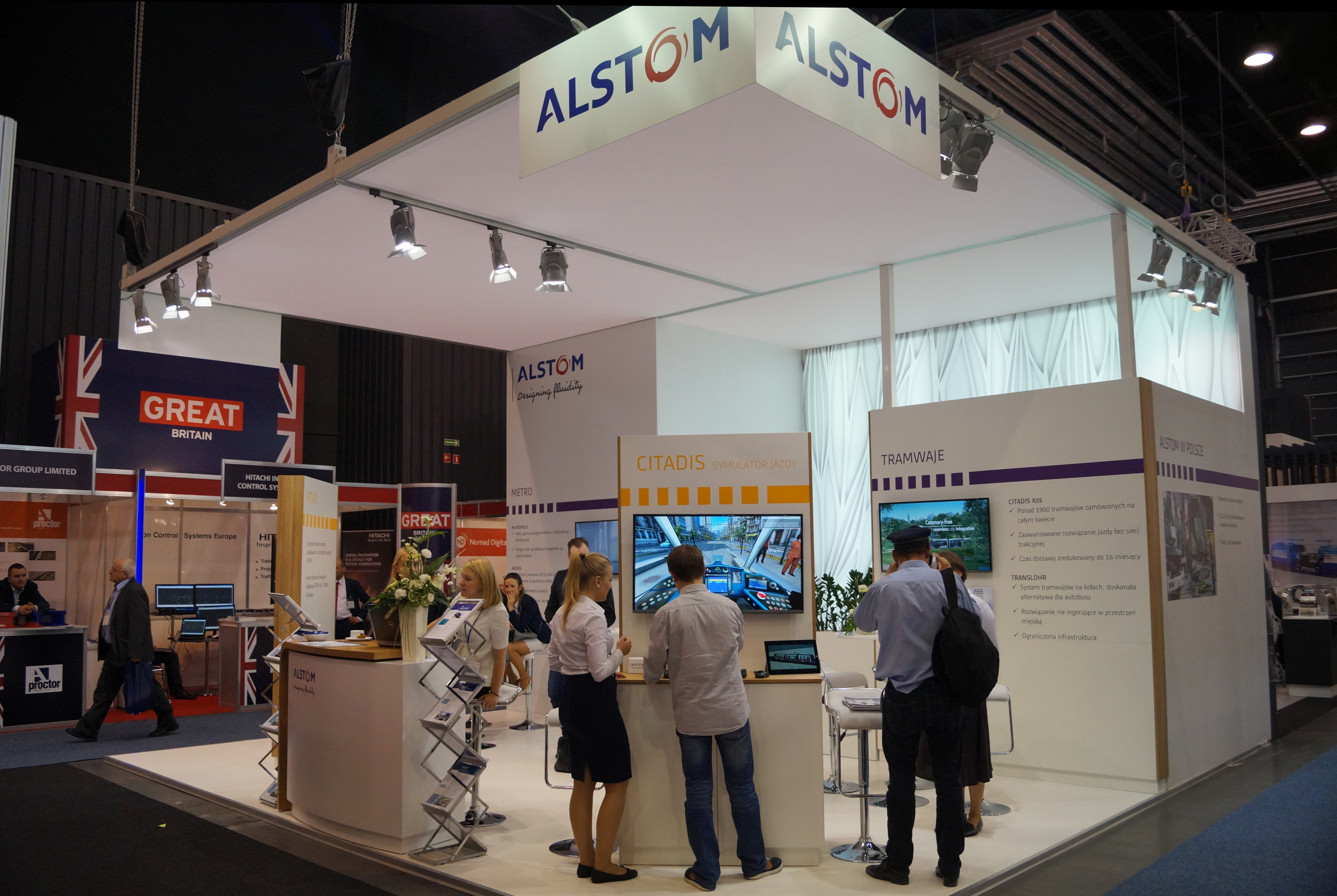
Alstom stand

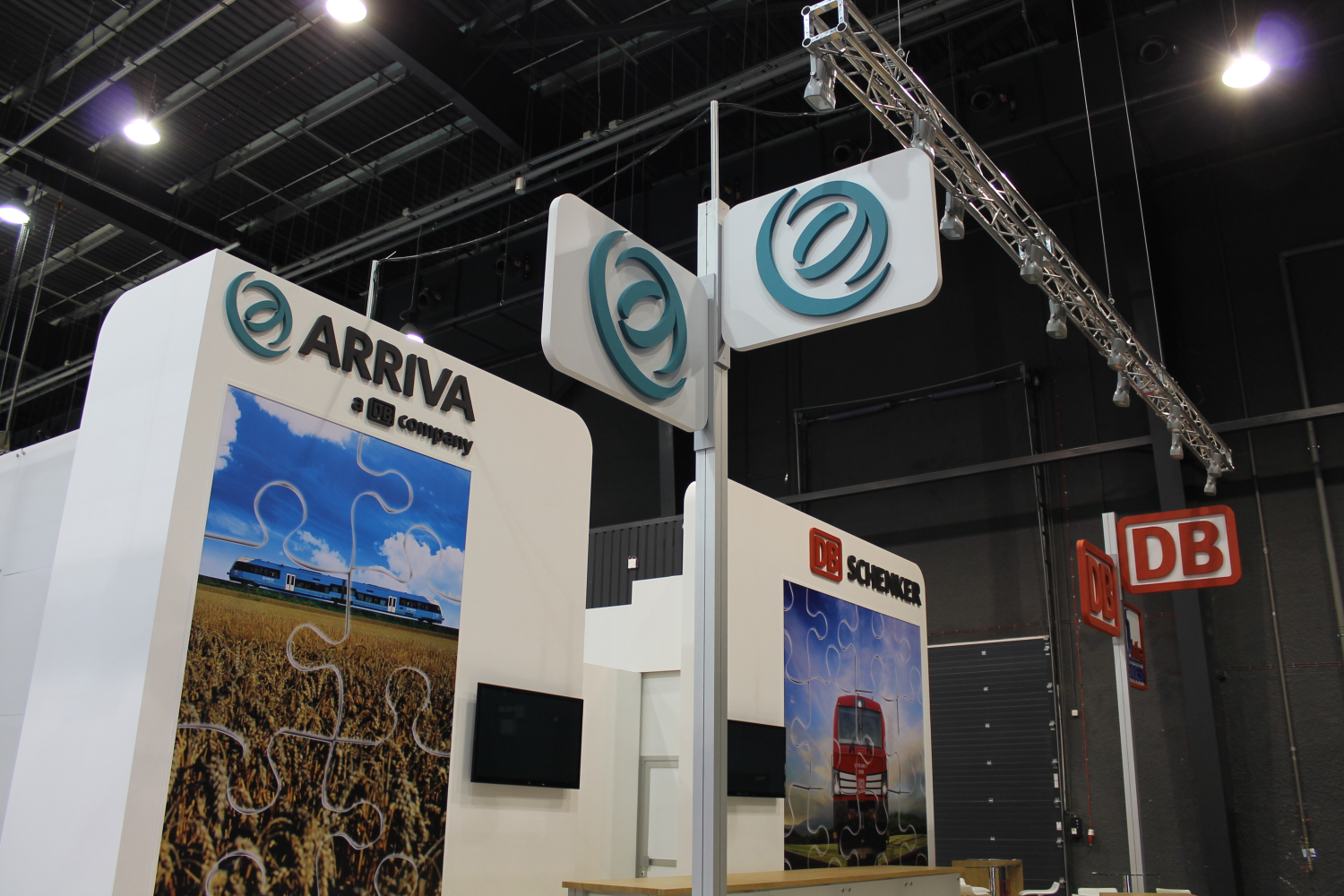
Joint Arriva and DB Schenker stand

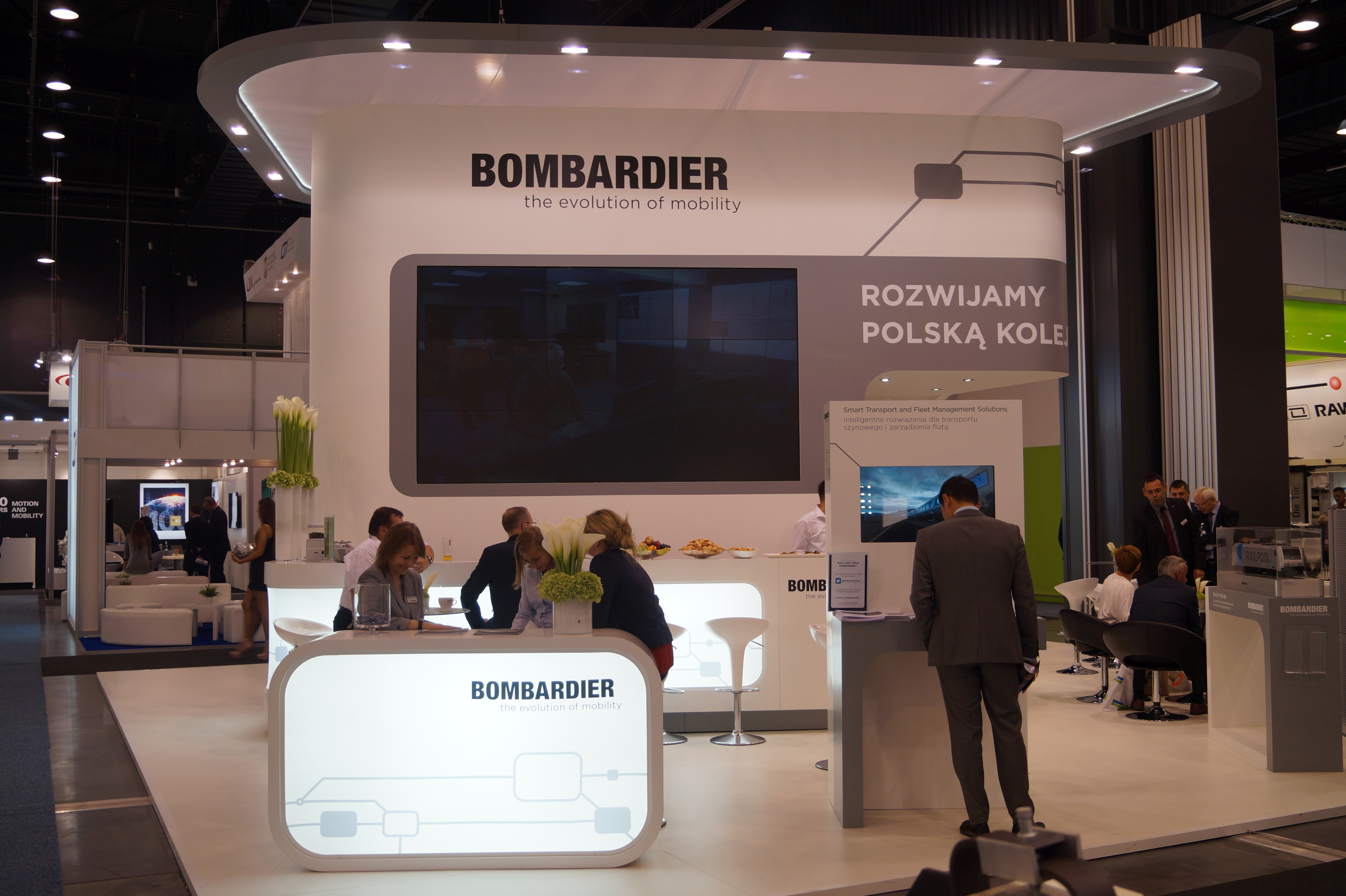
Bombardier stand

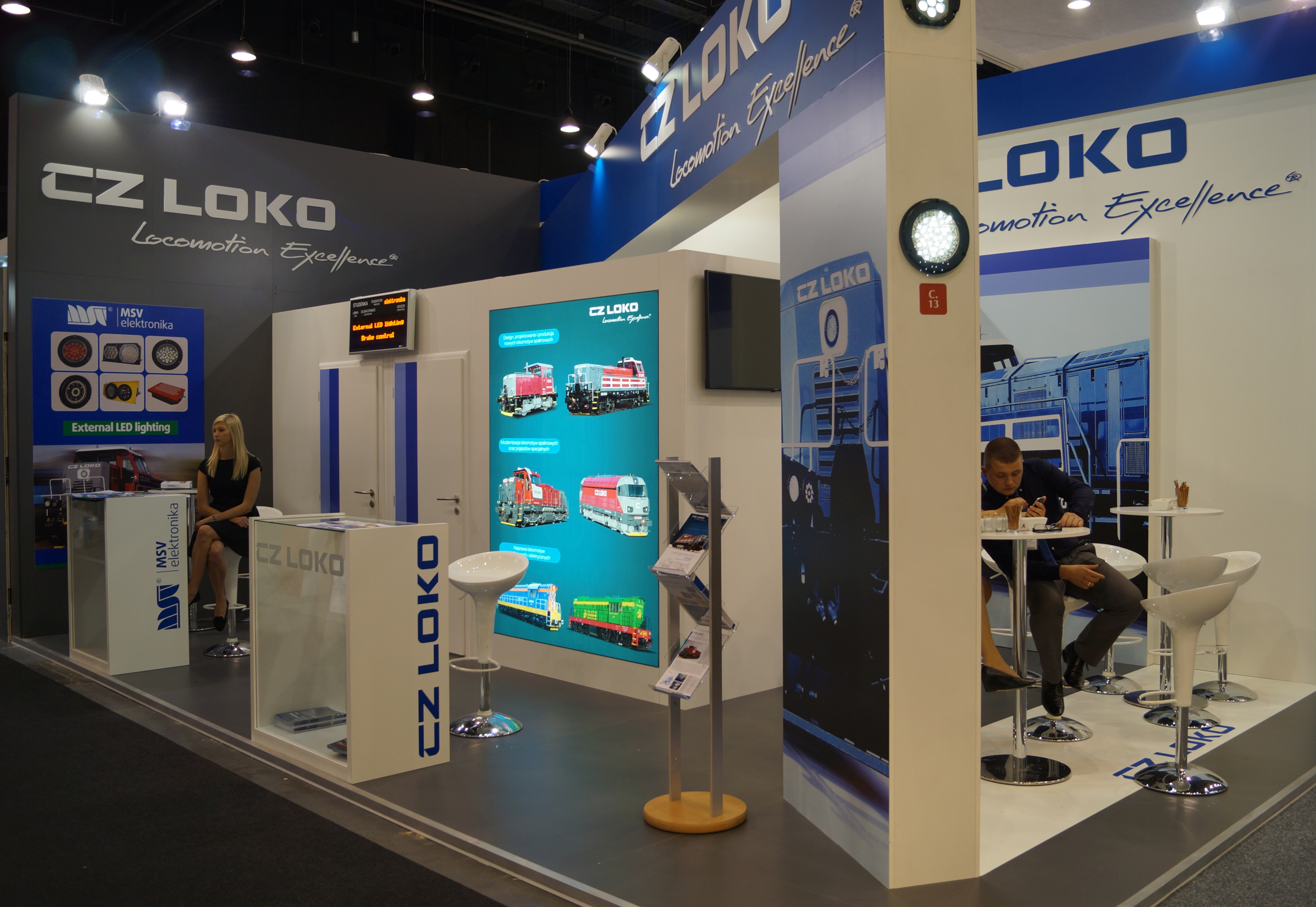
CZ Loko stand

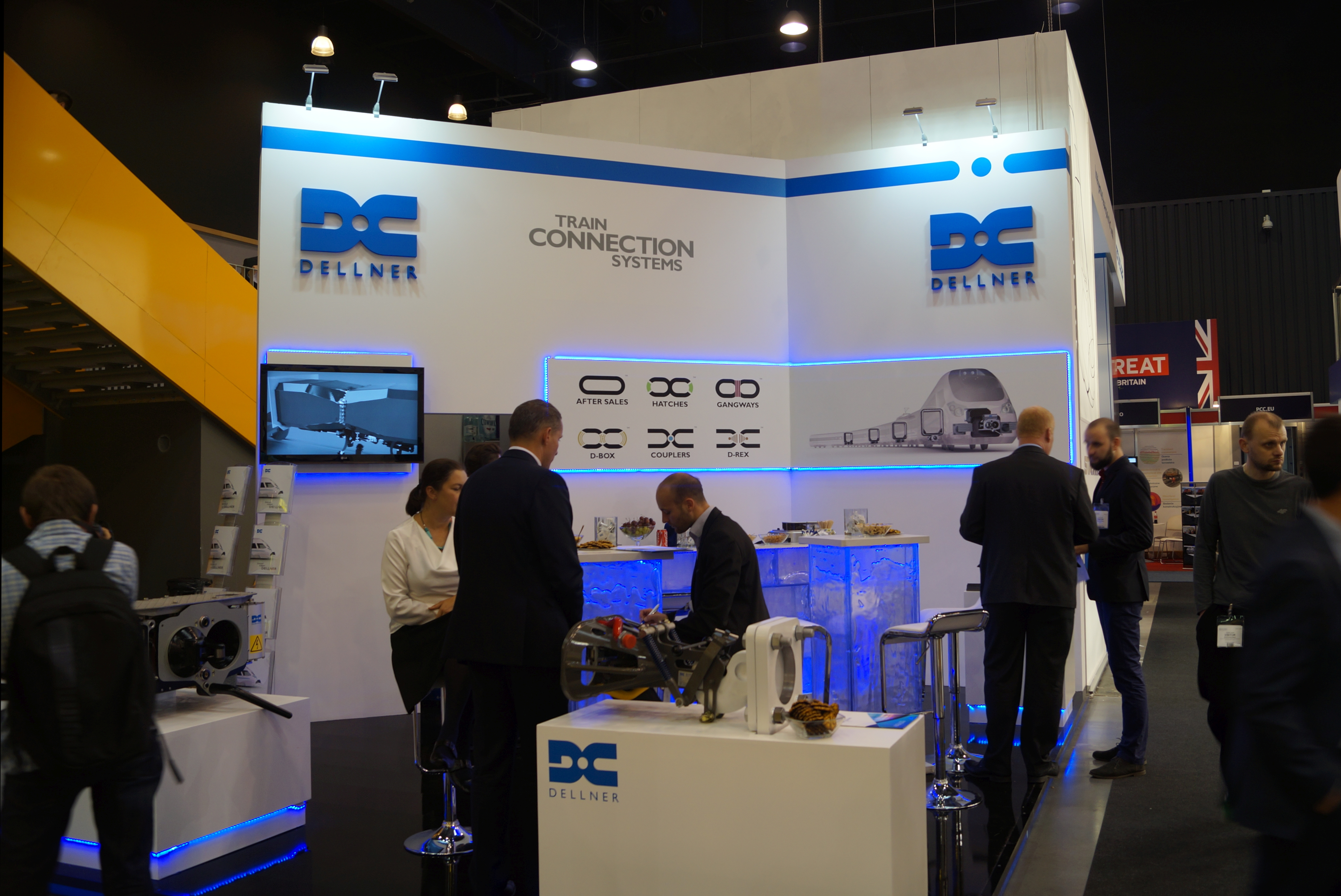
Dellner stand

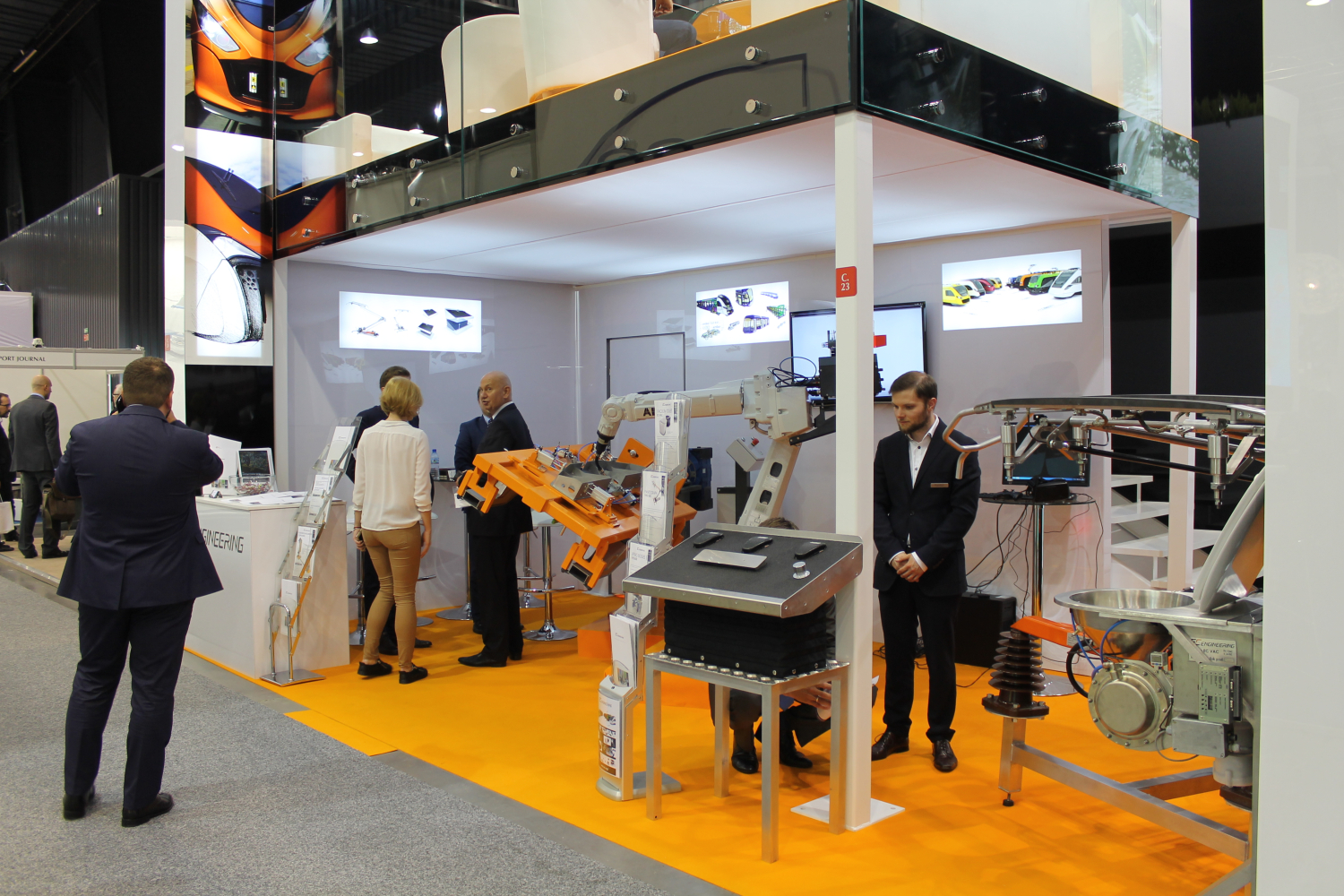
EC Engineering stand

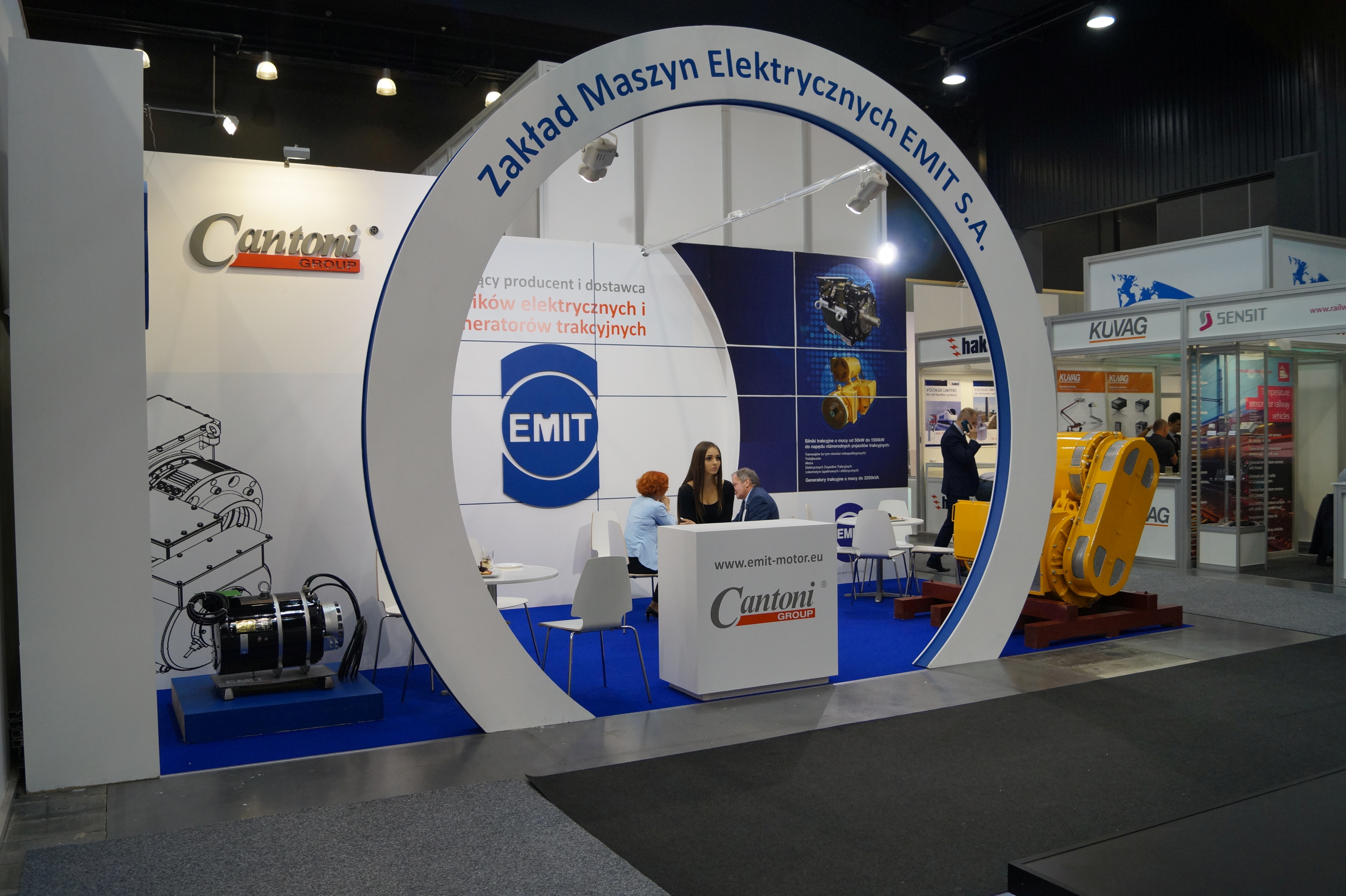
EMIT stand

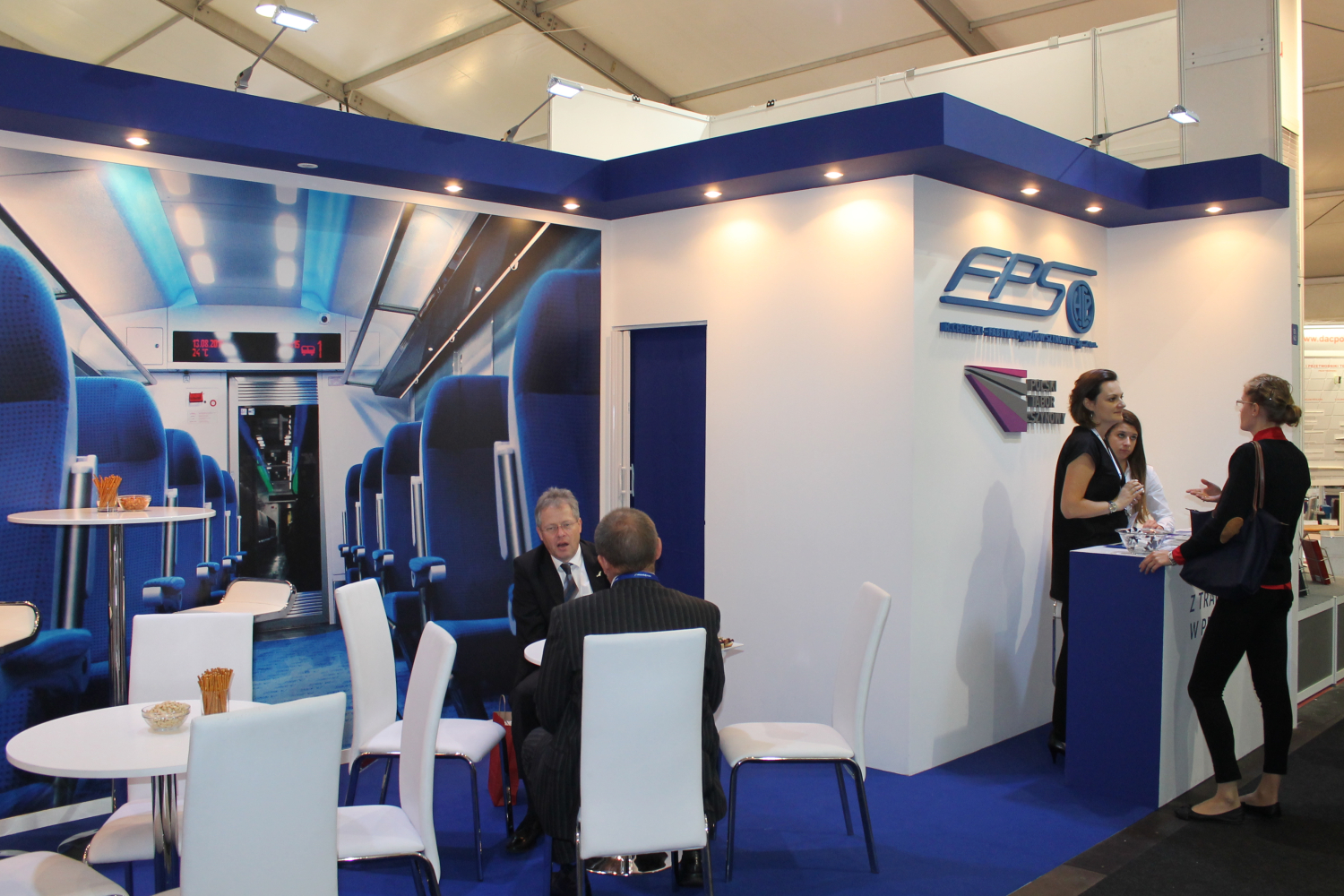
H. Cegielski – Rail Vehicles Factory stand

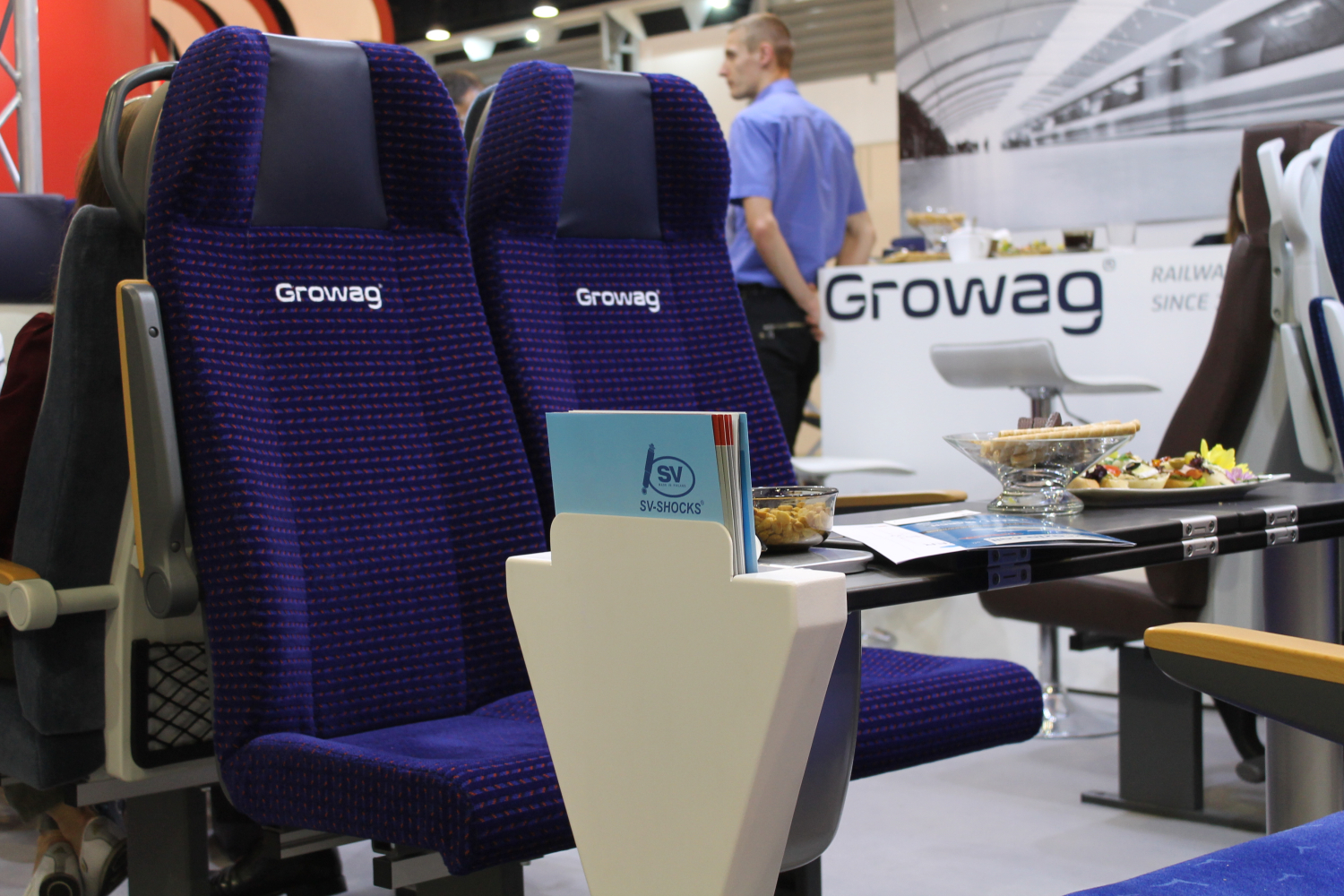
Growag seats

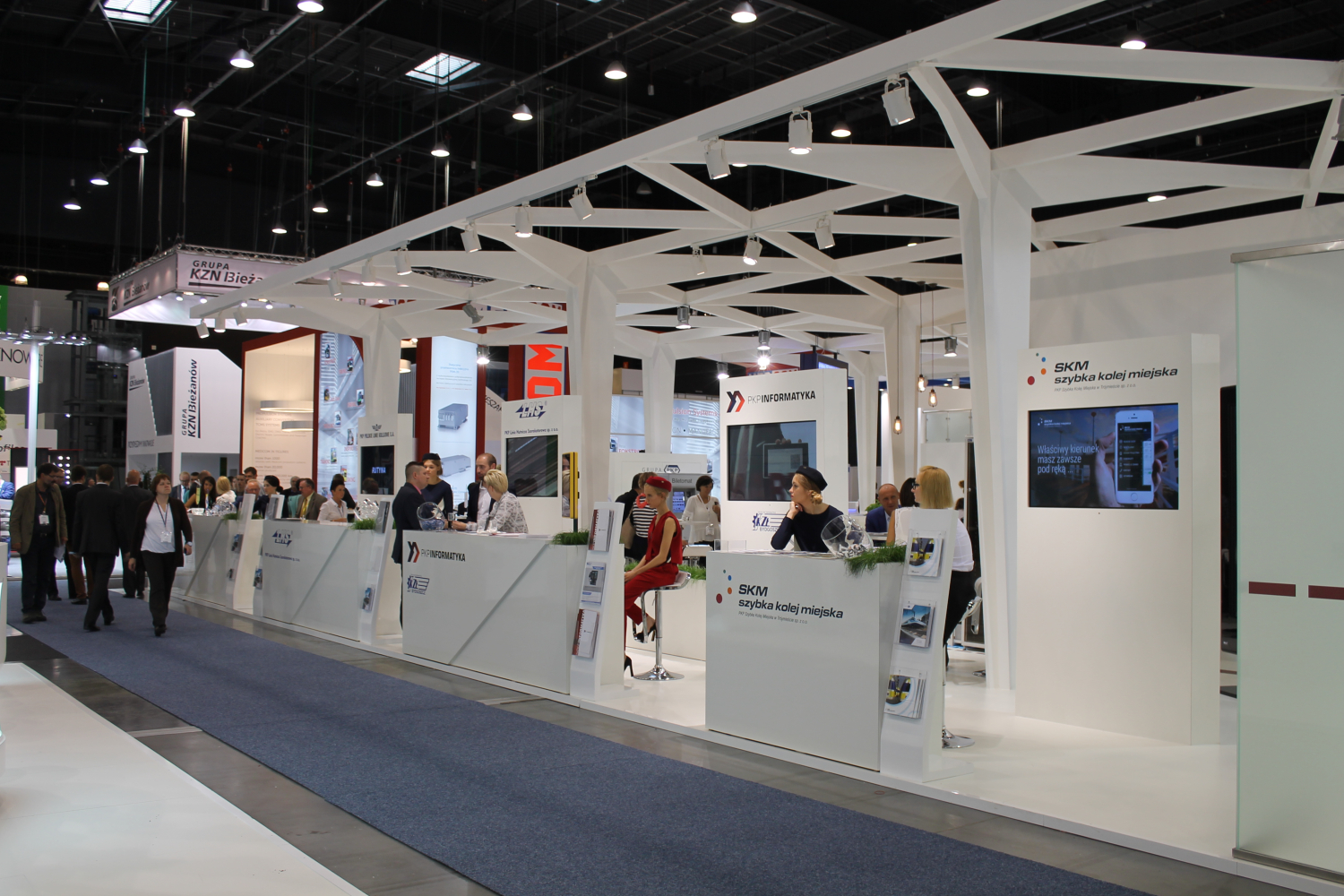
PKP Group stand

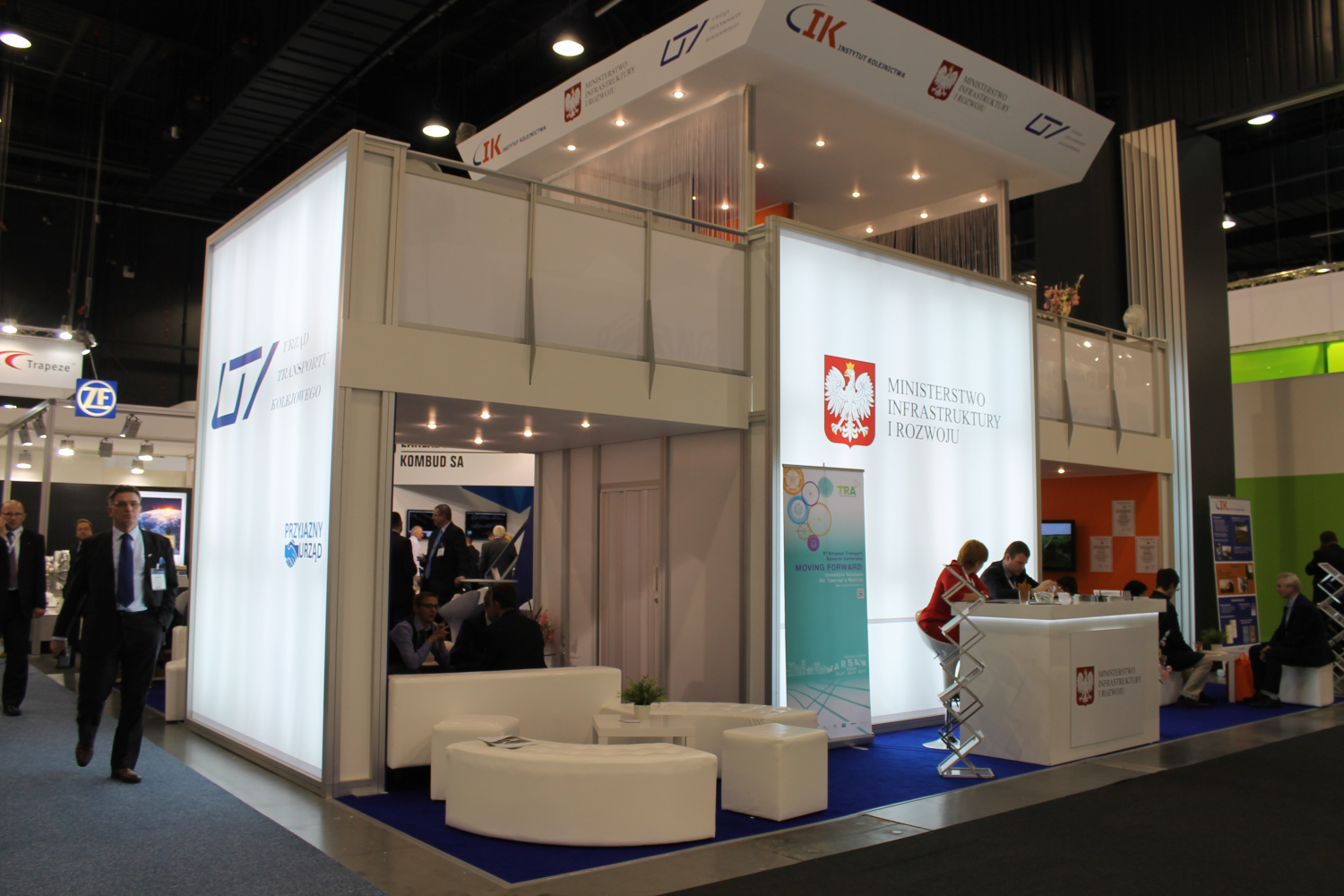
Joint Railway Institute, Railway Transport Office, and Ministry of Infrastructure and Development stand

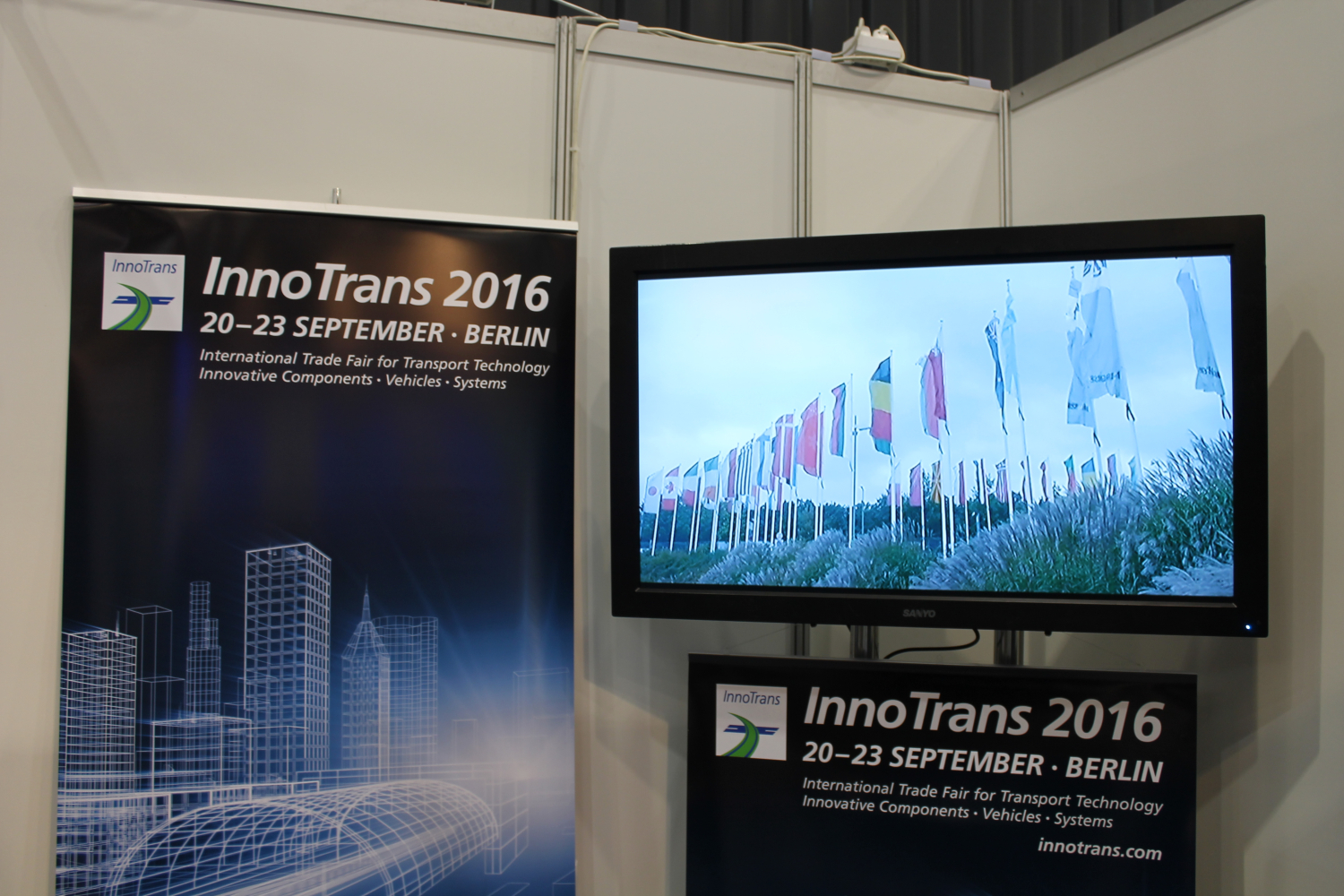
InnoTrans stand

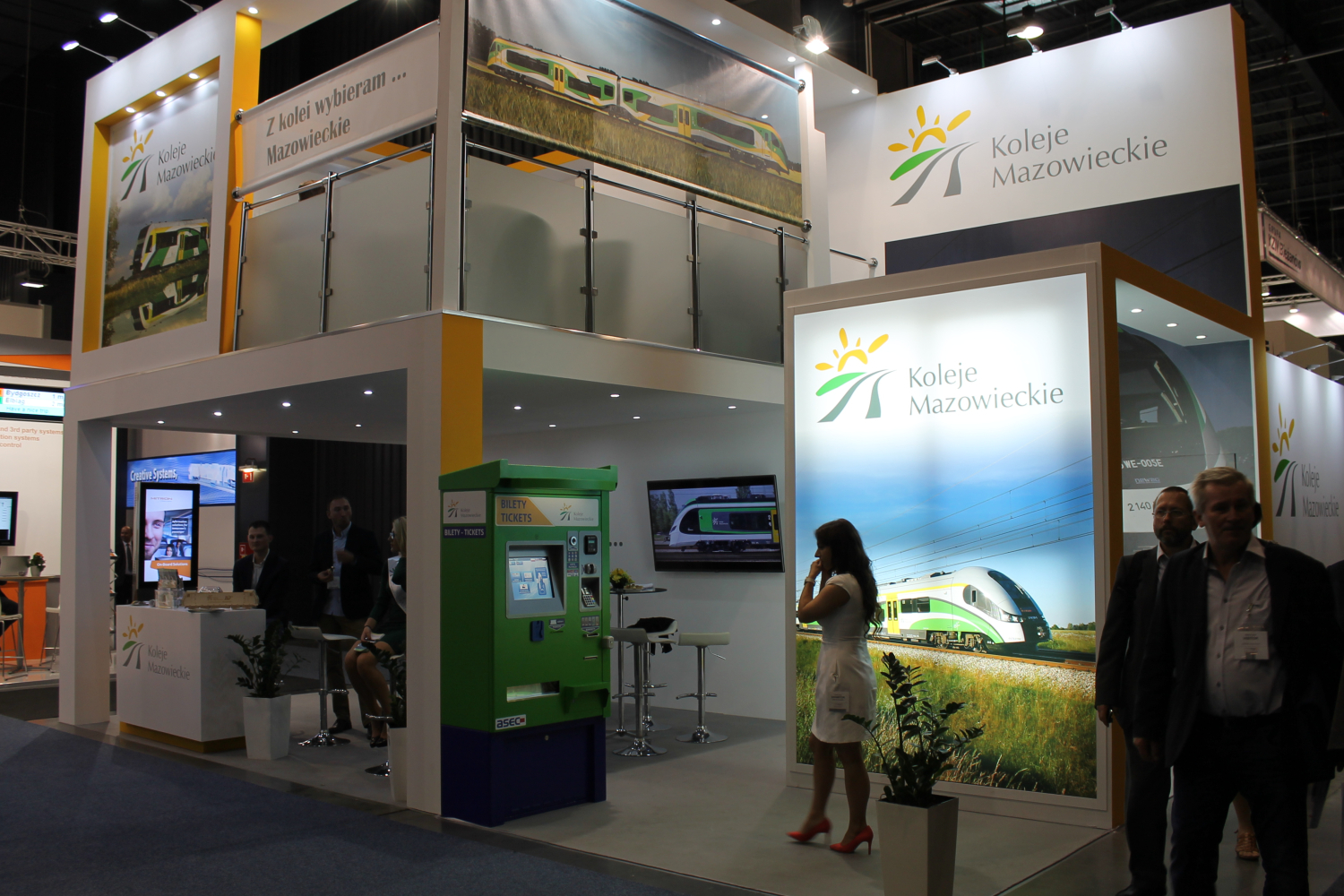
Masovian Railways stand

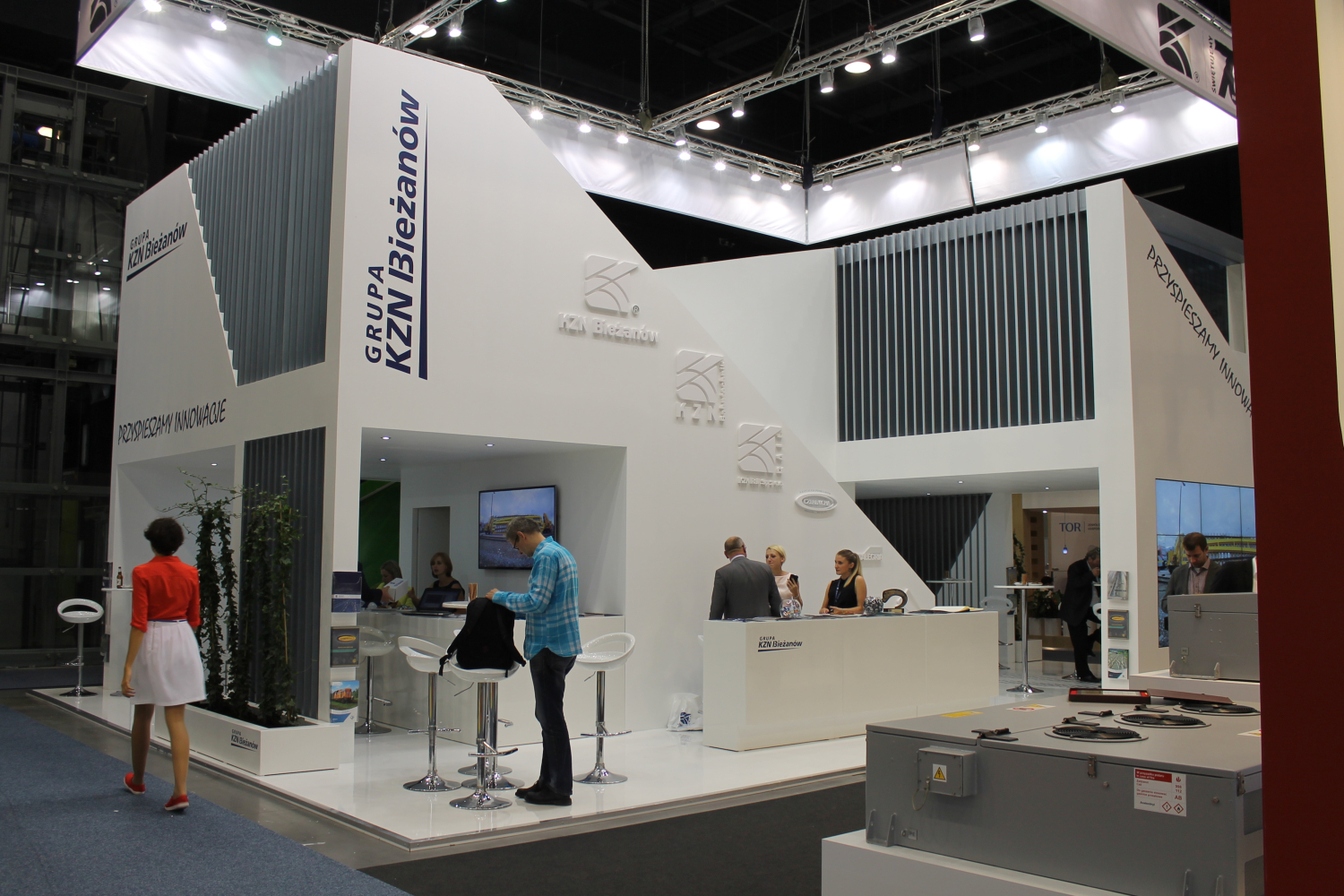
Bieżanów Railway Trackworks Plant stand

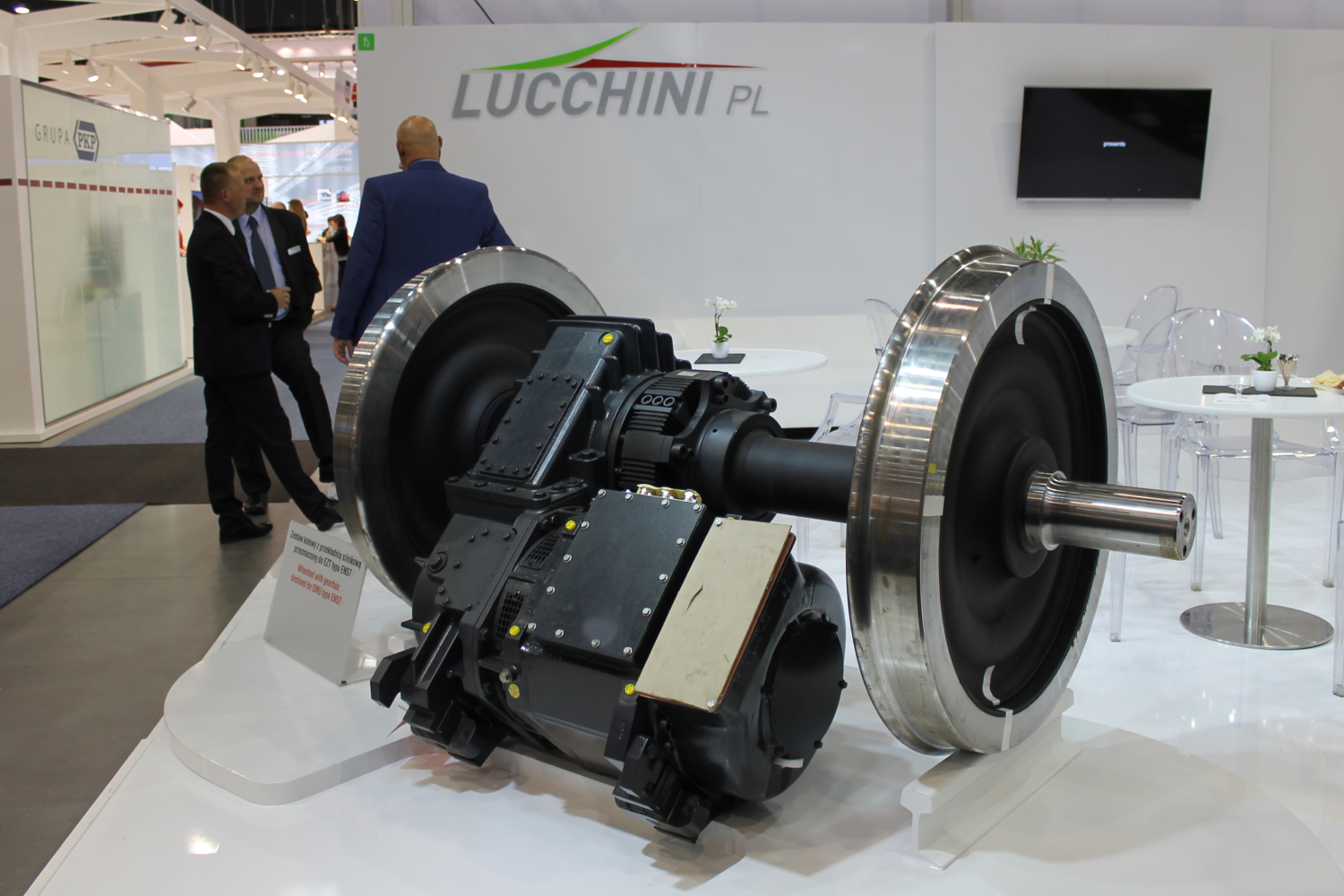
Lucchini wheelset

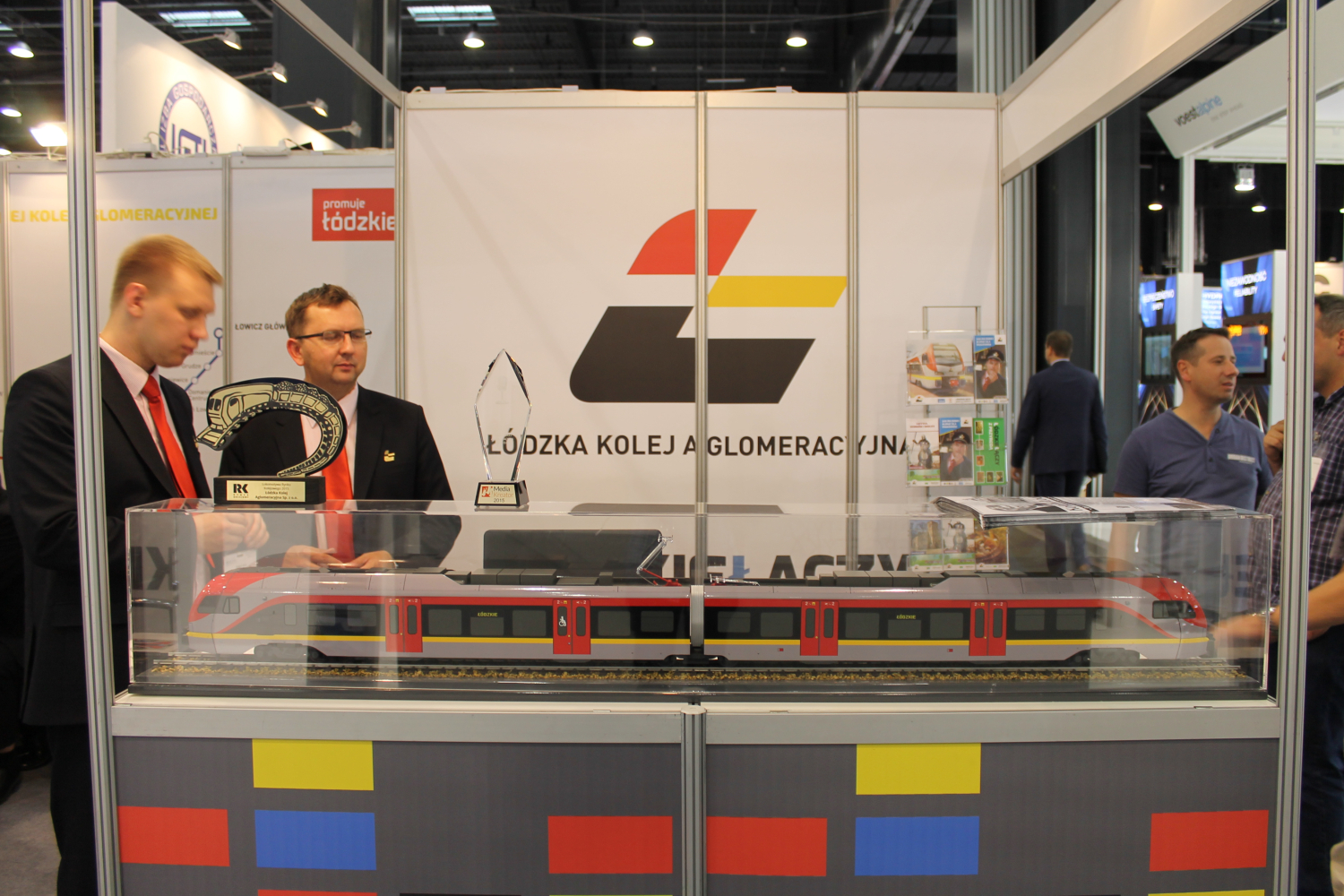
Łódzka Kolej Aglomeracyjna stand

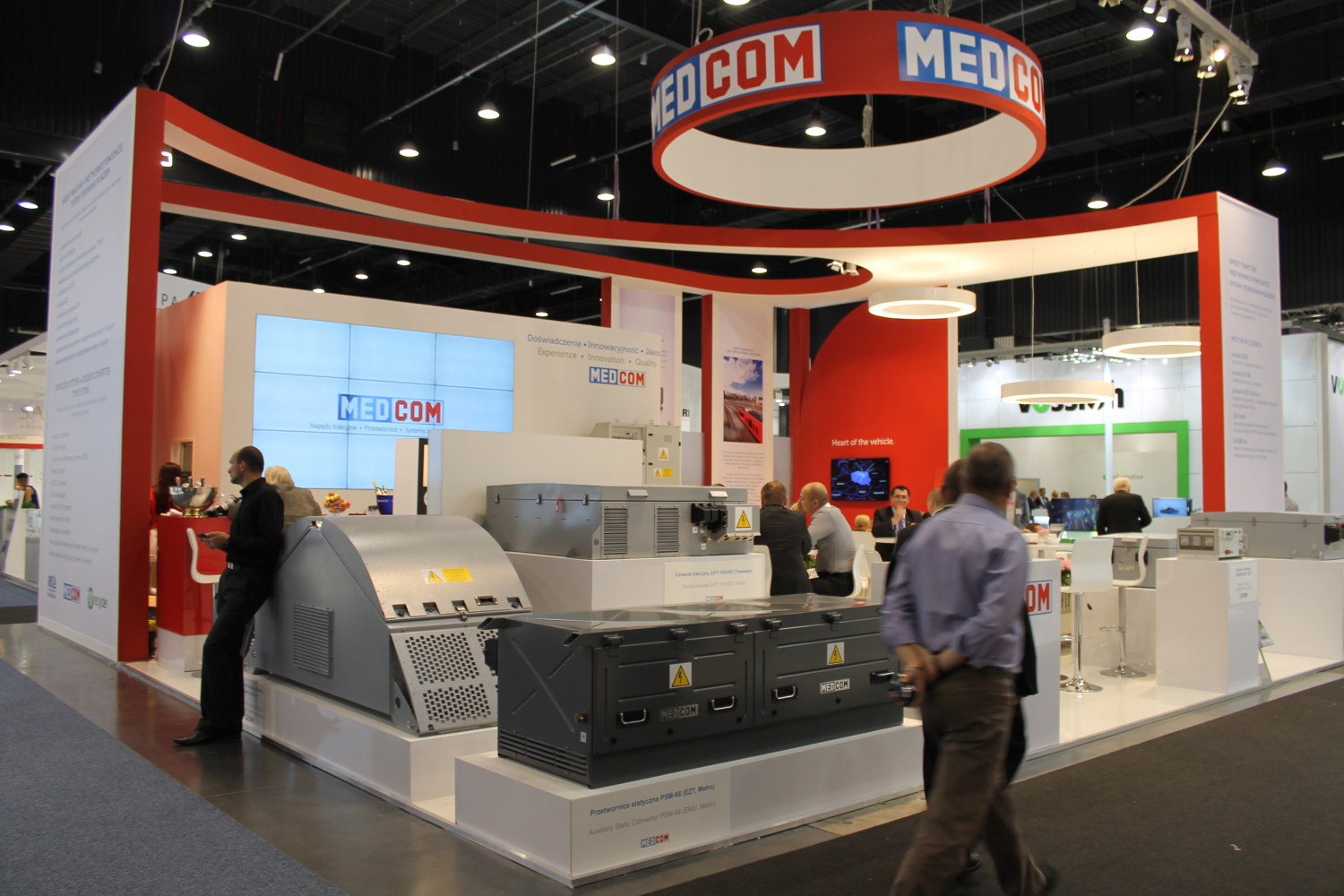
Medcom stand

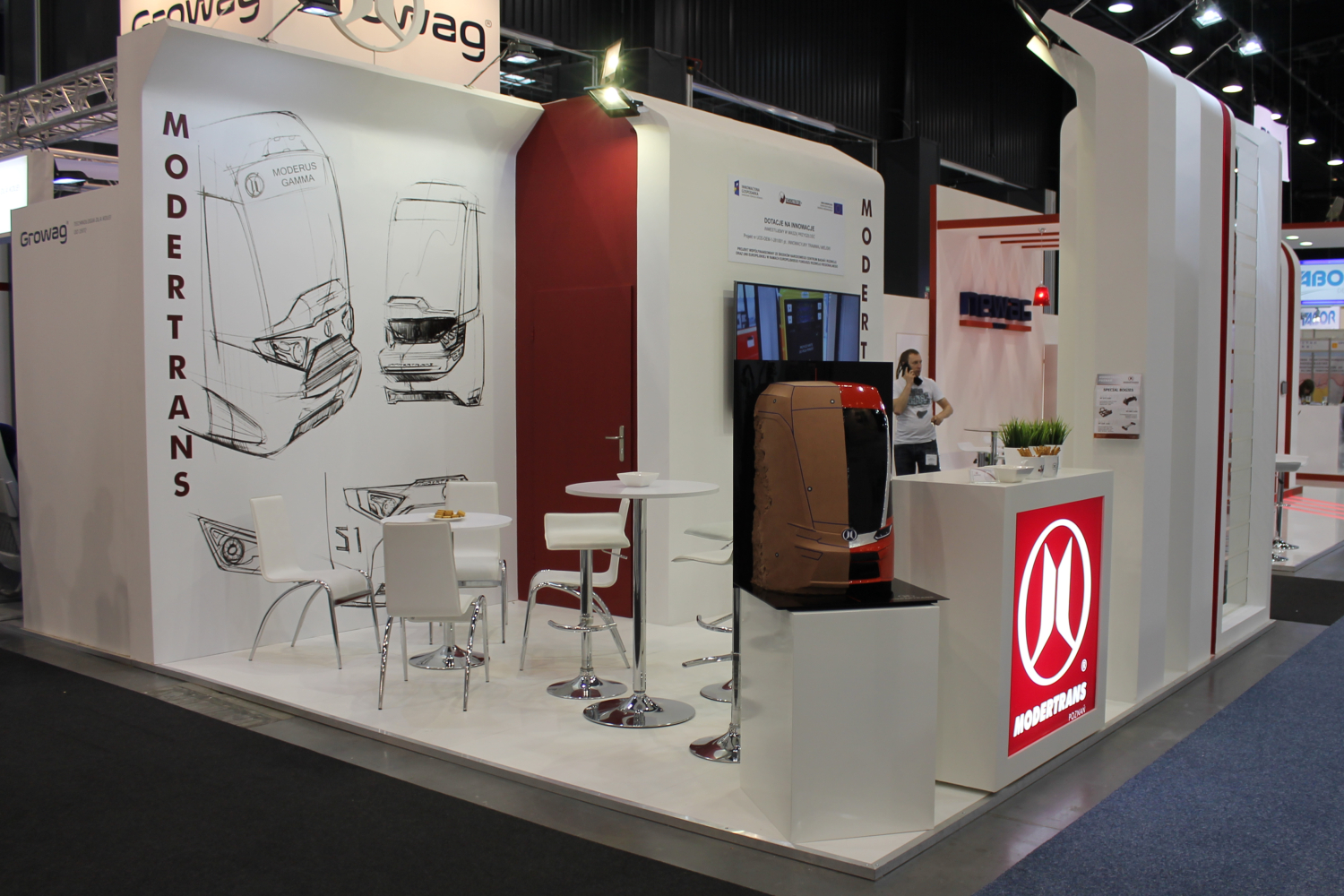
Modertrans stand

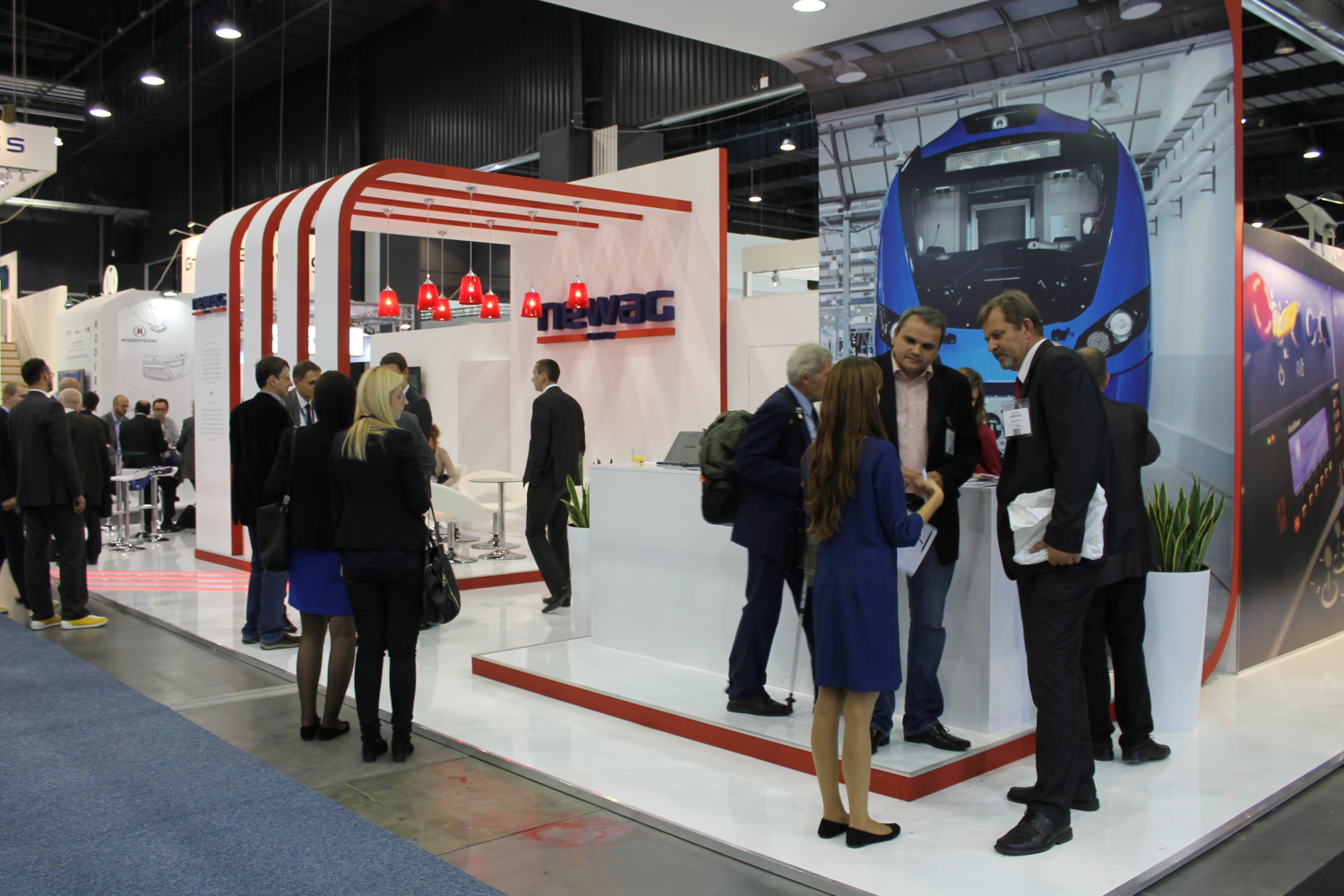
Newag stand

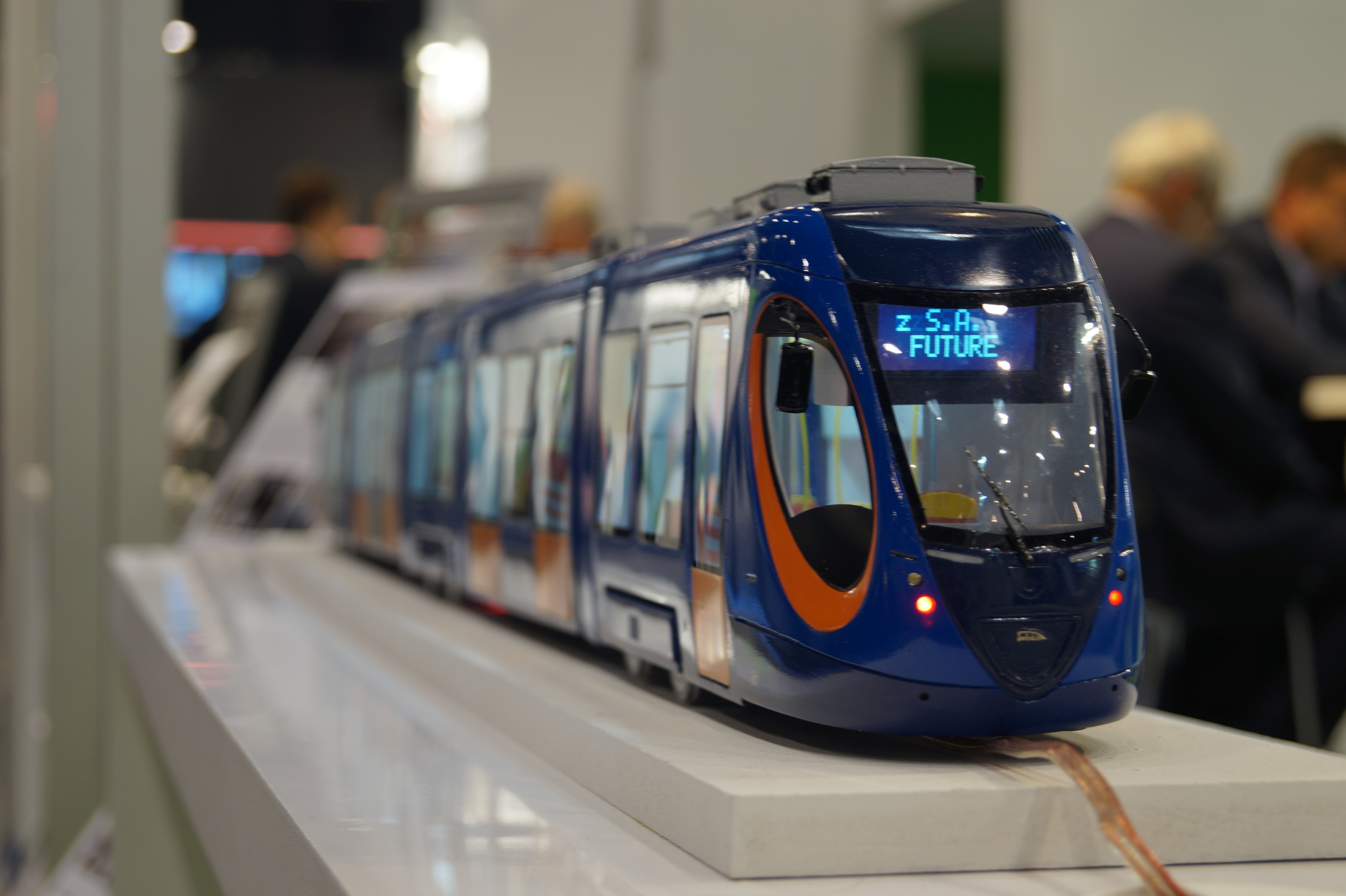
Tram model at Pesa stand

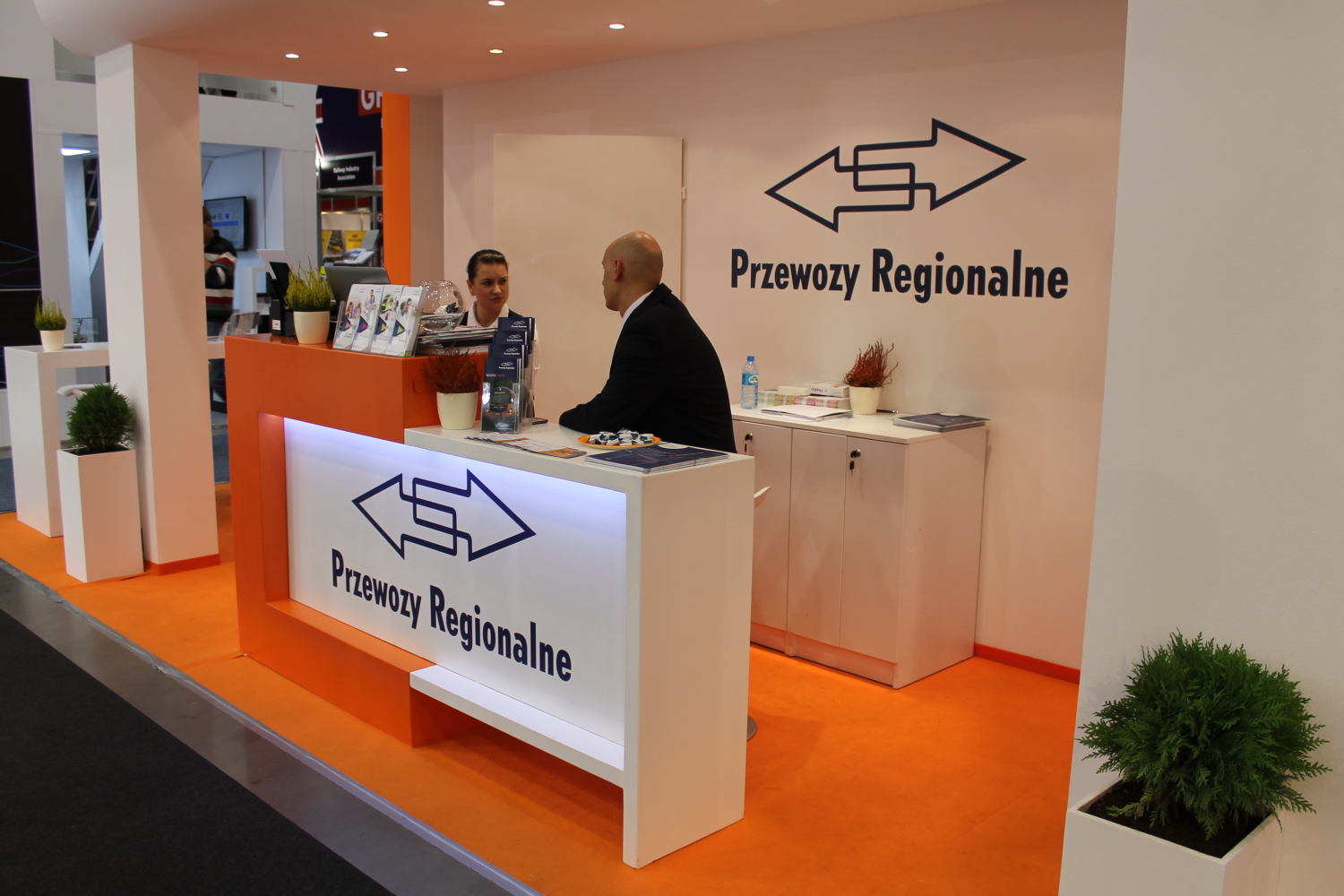
Przewozy Regionalne stand

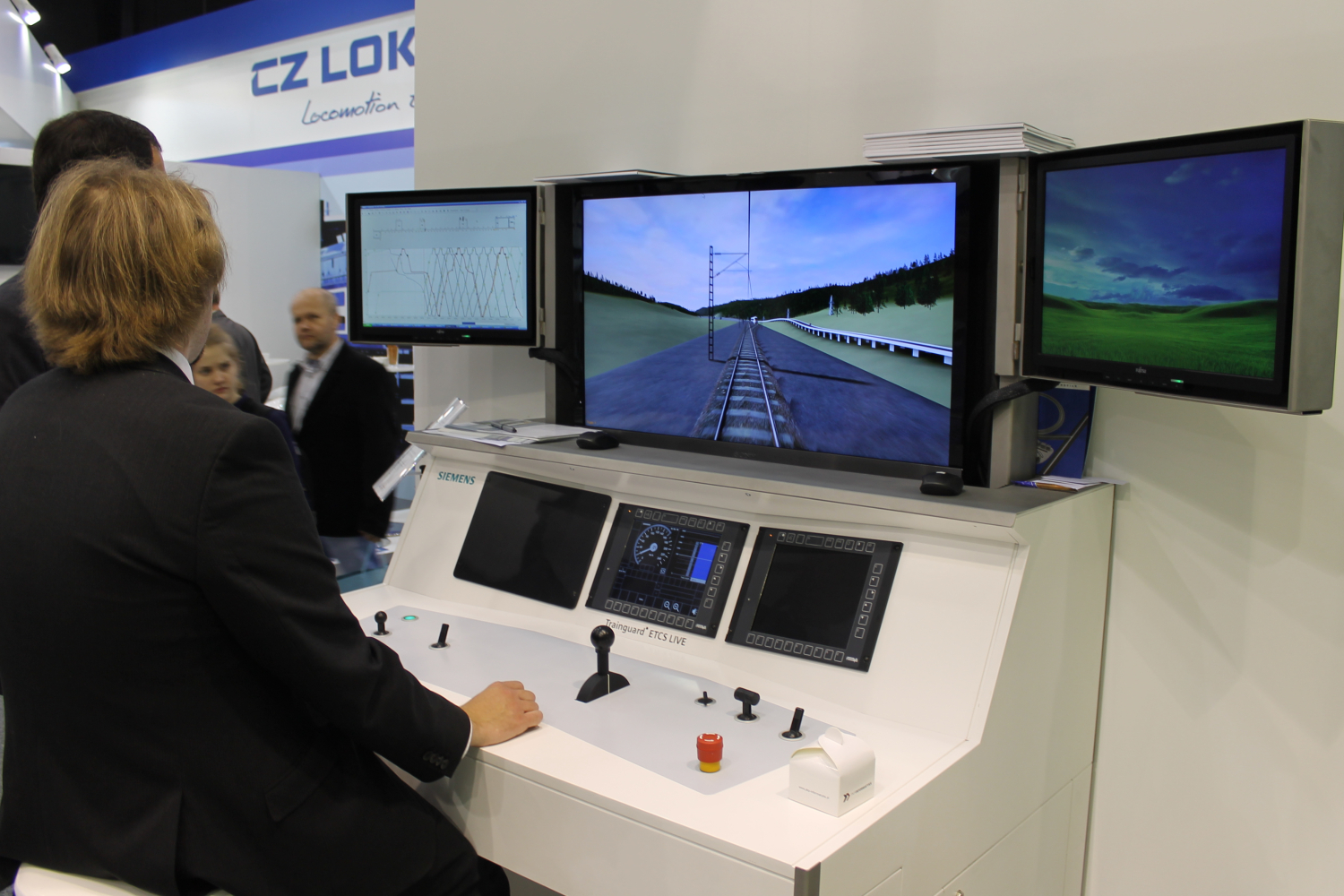
Simulator at Siemens stand

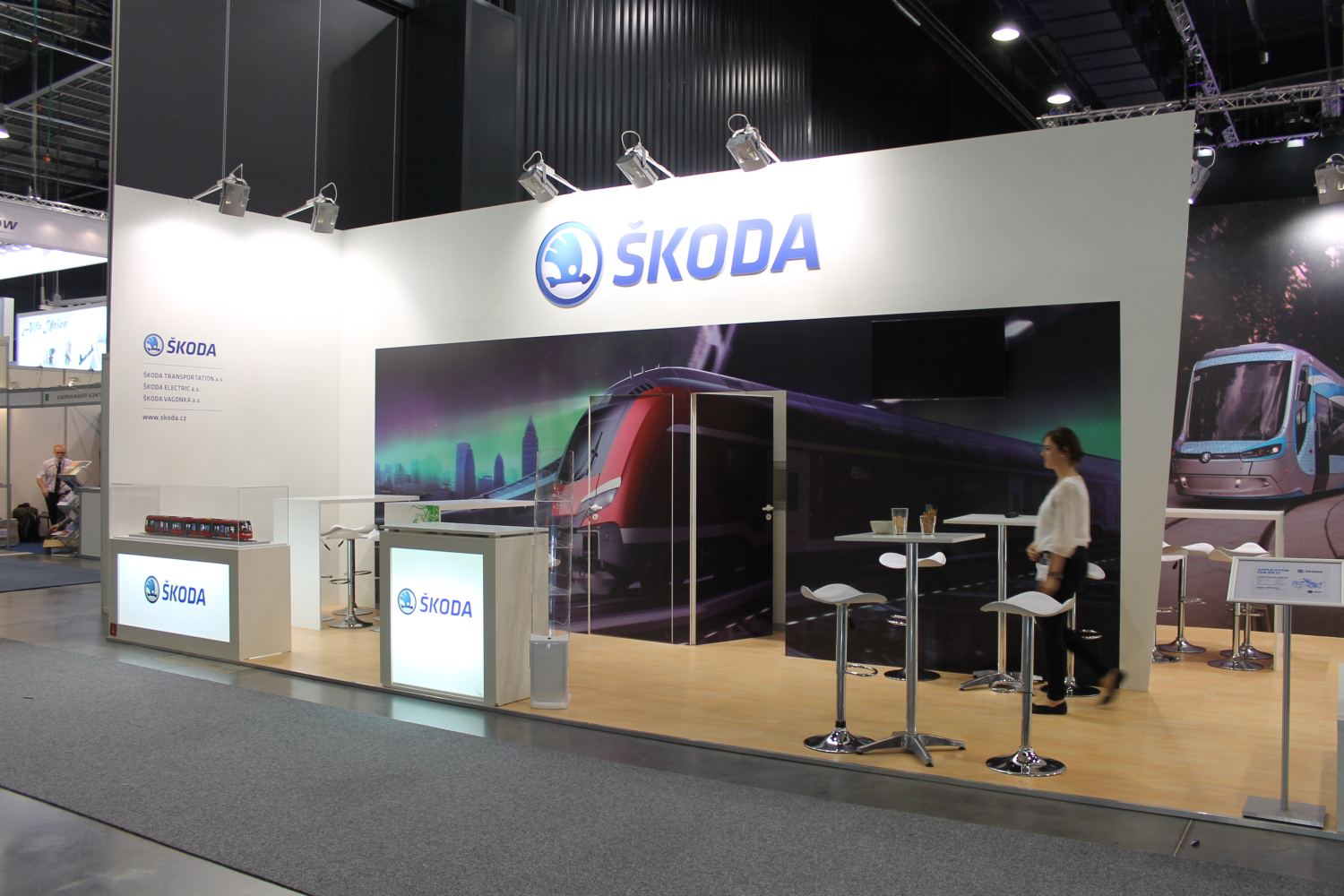
Škoda stand

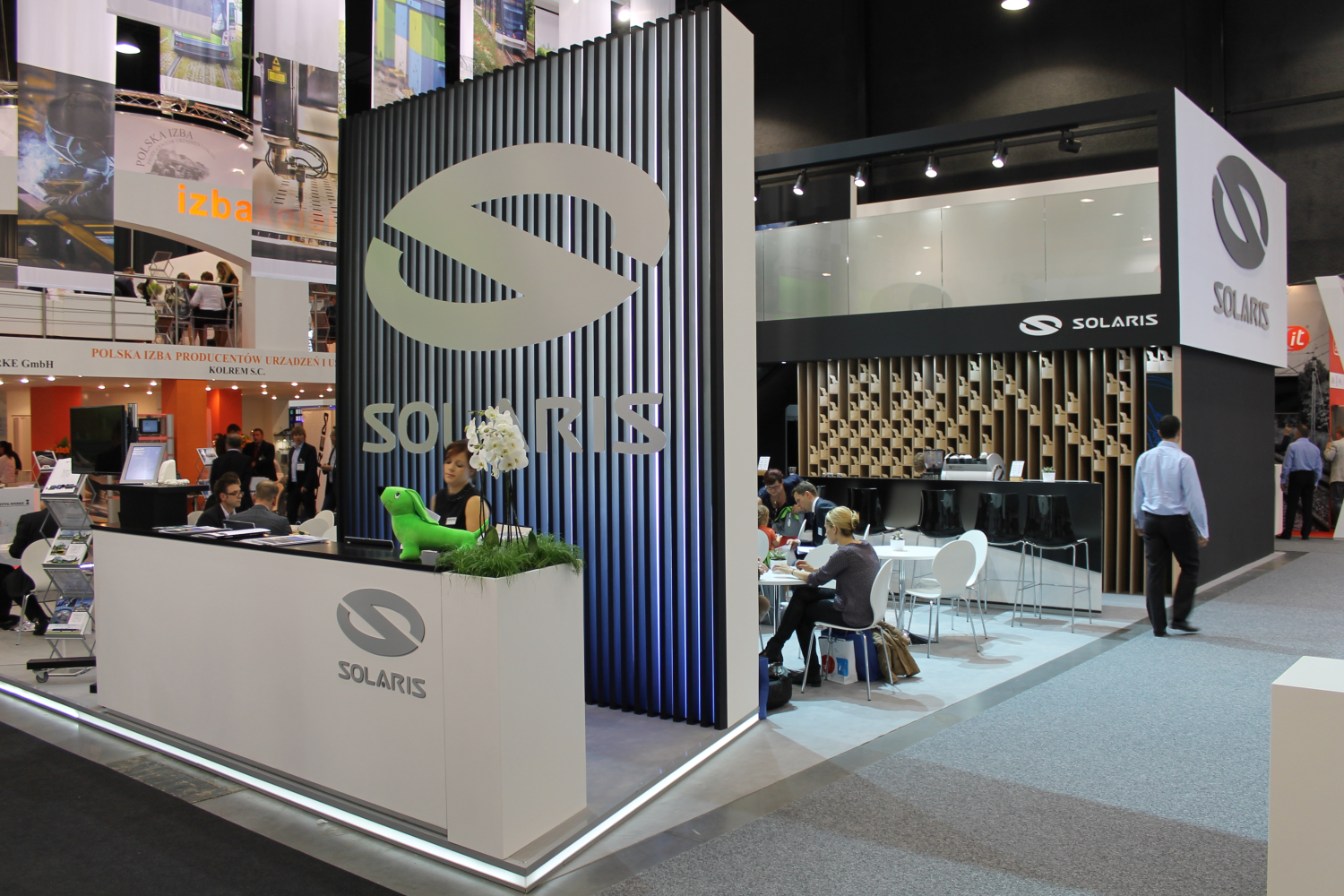
Solaris stand

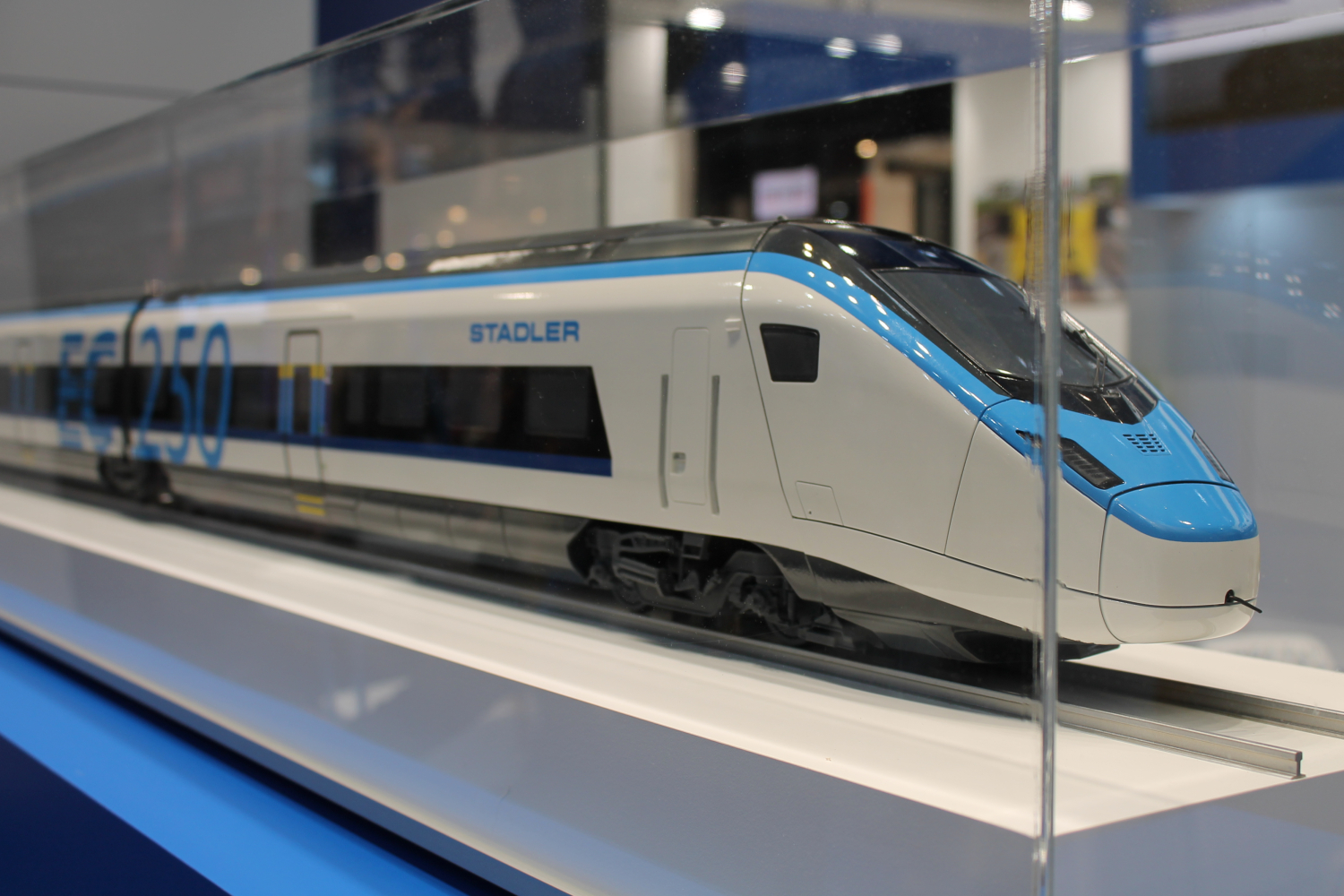
EC250 model at Stadler stand

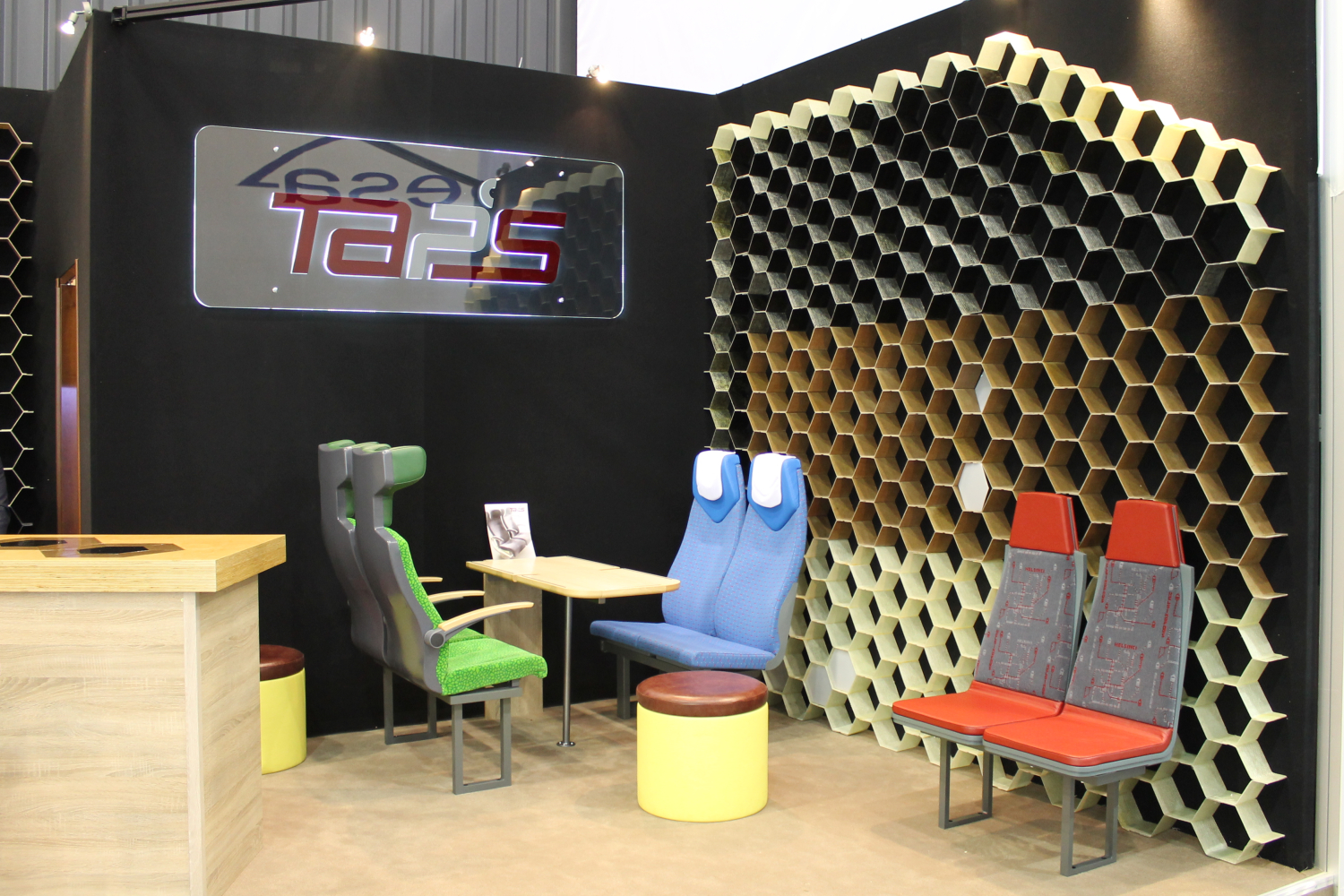
Taps seats

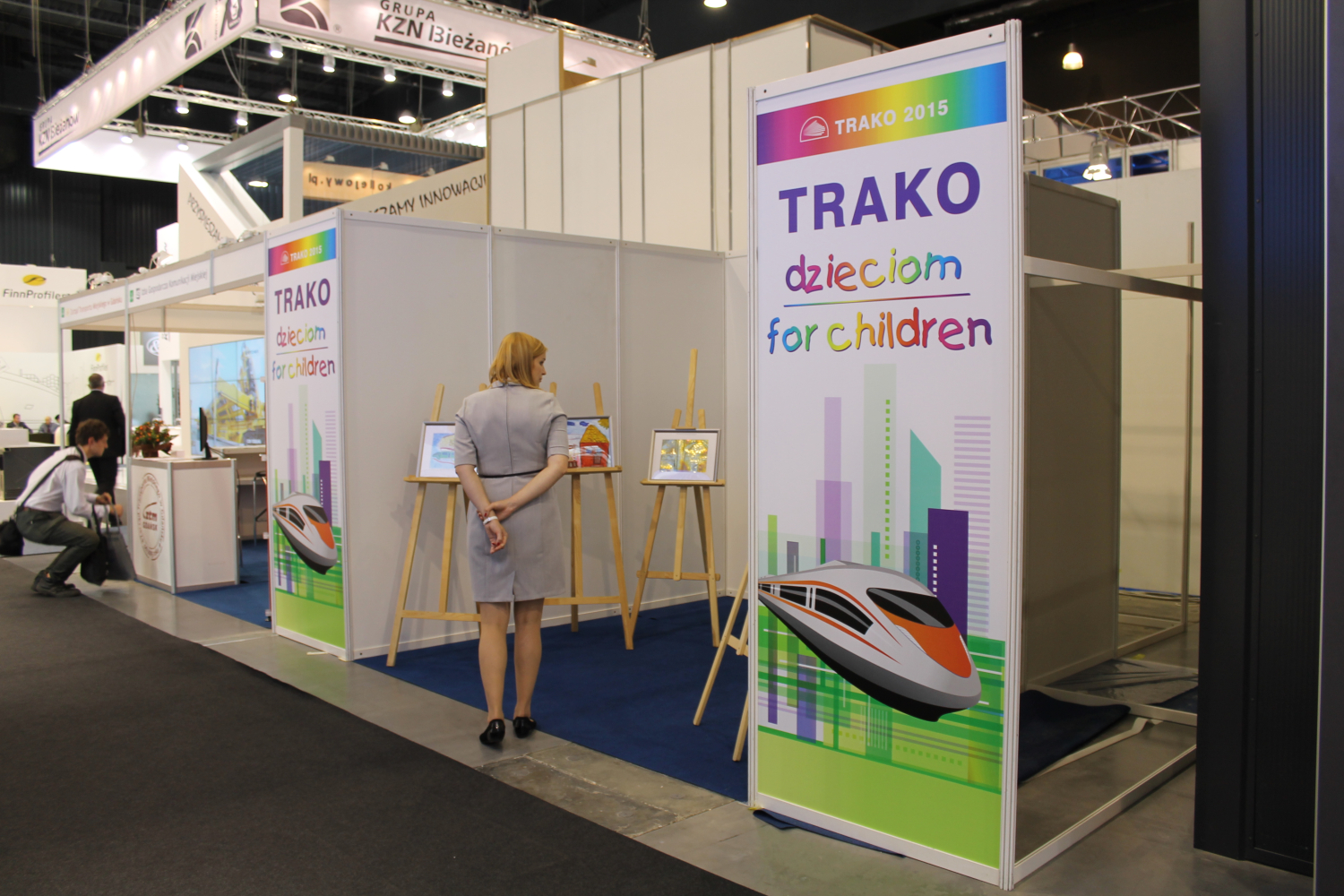
Trako for Kids

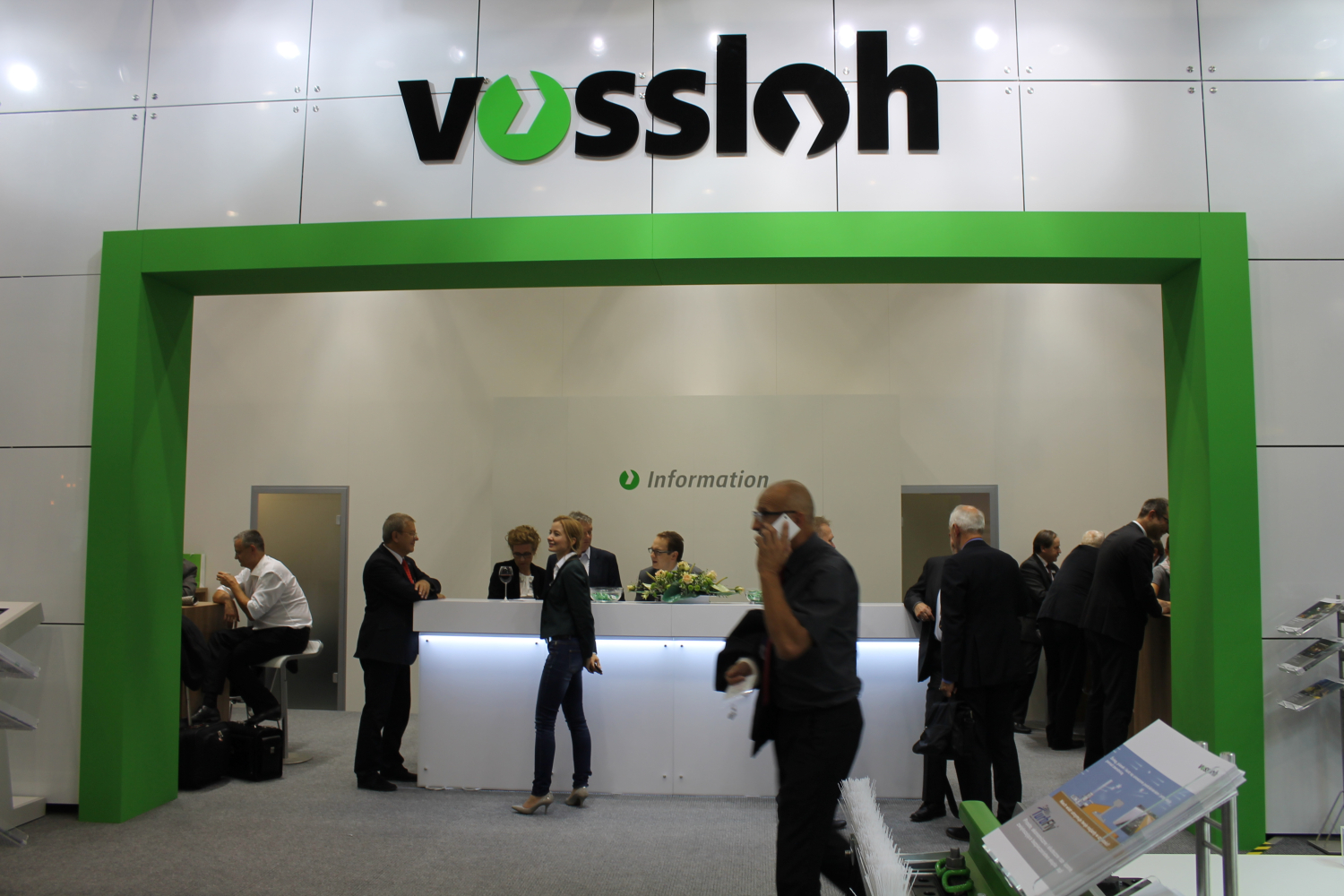
Vossloh stand

=== 2017 ===
The 12th International Railway Fair Trako 2017 was held from 26 to 29 September 2017 at AmberExpo. The event hosted 700 exhibitors from 25 countries. The exhibition area covered 30,000 m², and rolling stock as well as track machines and equipment were displayed on tracks with a total length of 1 km. For the first time in the fair's history, a Career Day was organized on the last day of the event.

The following competitions were concluded and awards presented:

- Ernest Malinowski award:
  - Rolling stock and separate units and components: Solaris (award), Pesa (distinction)
  - Technical innovations applied to rolling stock: Łódź Agglomeration Railway (award), Ente (distinction)
- Józef Nowkuński award:
  - Completed line and building investments in Poland: Track Tec (award), Trakcja PRKiI (distinction)
  - Innovations in infrastructure: Rail-Mil Computers (award), Elester-PKP (distinction)
- Chamber of Urban Transport Jan Podoski award:
  - Rolling stock: Modertrans Poznań (award), Solaris (distinction)
  - Parts, components, and rolling stock equipment: Enika (award), Medcom (distinction)
  - Track infrastructure: M&MR Trading Polska (distinction)
  - Power and electrical infrastructure: Trakcja PRKiI (distinction)
- Association of Communication Engineers and Technicians of the Republic of Poland Czesław Jaworski award:
  - Vehicles: Pesa (award), Enika (distinction)
  - Infrastructure: Elester-PKP (award), Kuca (distinction)
- Most attractive exhibition:
  - Category up to 30 m²: Koltech, První Signální, Elester-PKP
  - Category from 31 m²: Polregio, Aste, Cenzin
- Socially Responsible Railway Company award: Lower Silesian Railways, DB Cargo Polska, Łódź Agglomeration Railway
- Association of Polish Electrical Engineers President's medal: Trakcja PRKiI, Medcom
- The Golden Chariot award: Medcom, Knorr-Bremse, Viktor Kashanau
- Patriot Ring of the Association for National Security Support: Sławoj Leszek Głódź, Krzysztof Mamiński

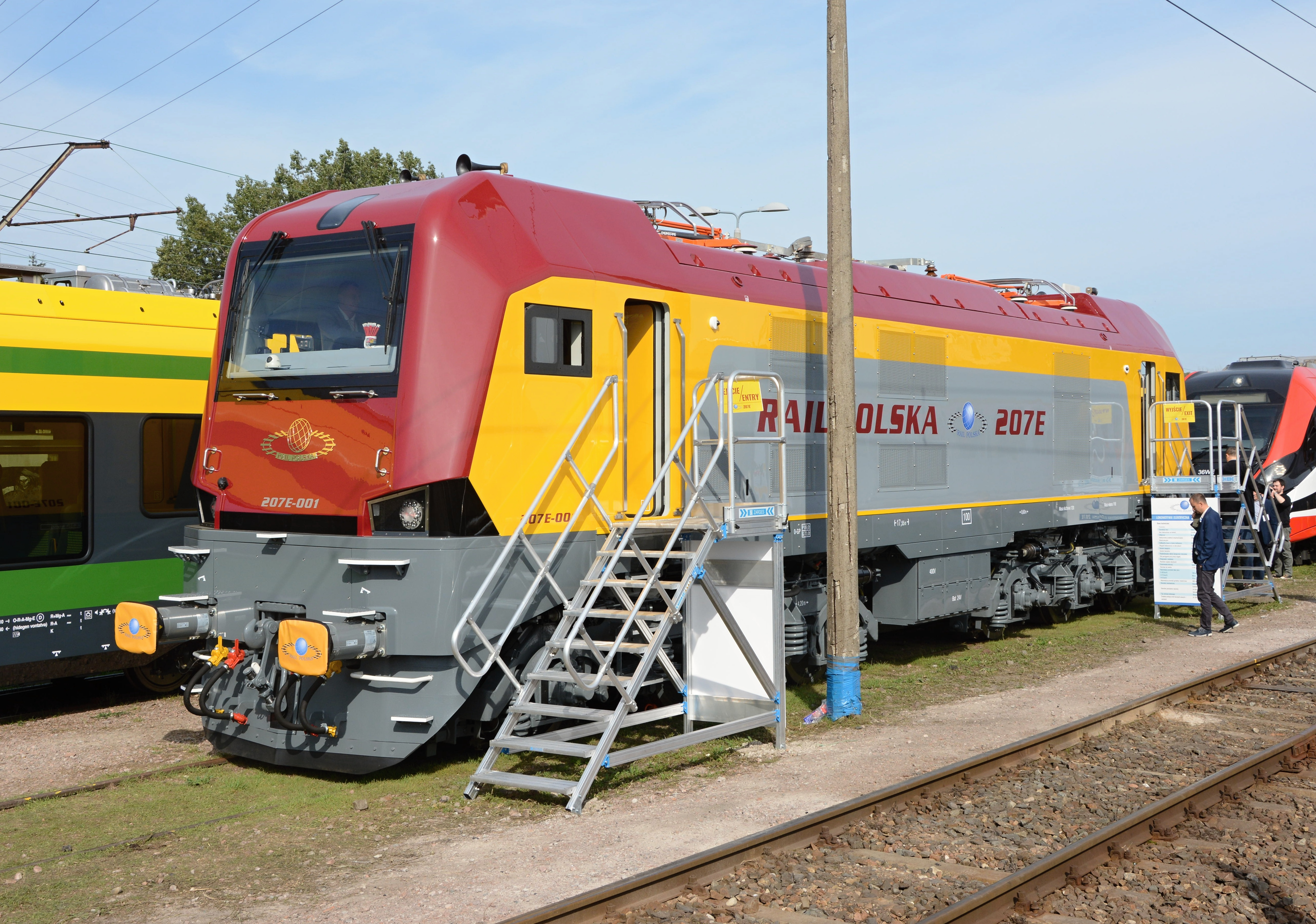
207E-001

Rolling stock presented:

- Chemet: Tank wagon, capacity 113.5 m³
- Crystal Traktor: 9C160 Orion
- Fire-Max: Unimog
- Legios: Falns, Zags
- Modertrans Poznań: Gamma LF 01 AC
- Newag: 36WEa-002 Impuls, E4DCUd-002 Griffin
- Pesa: 111Ed-005 Gama, 21WEa-002 Elf II
- PKP Intercity: 111Arow, 144A, 168A, 406A, EP05-23, EP08-001
- Plasser & Theurer: Unimat 09-4x4/4S E³
- Polregio: EN57FPS-1608 Feniks 57, SA139-025 Link
- Rail Polska: 207E-001
- Siemens: Vectron MS
- Stadler: 435 501 FLIRT, 75x51 FLIRT
- Stadler and Solaris: Tramino XL
- Szybka Kolej Miejska: 9 683 000-5, WM-15H.00
- Wichary Technologies: CRAB 1500
- Rail Vehicles Plant: ZTU-300.01

=== 2019 ===
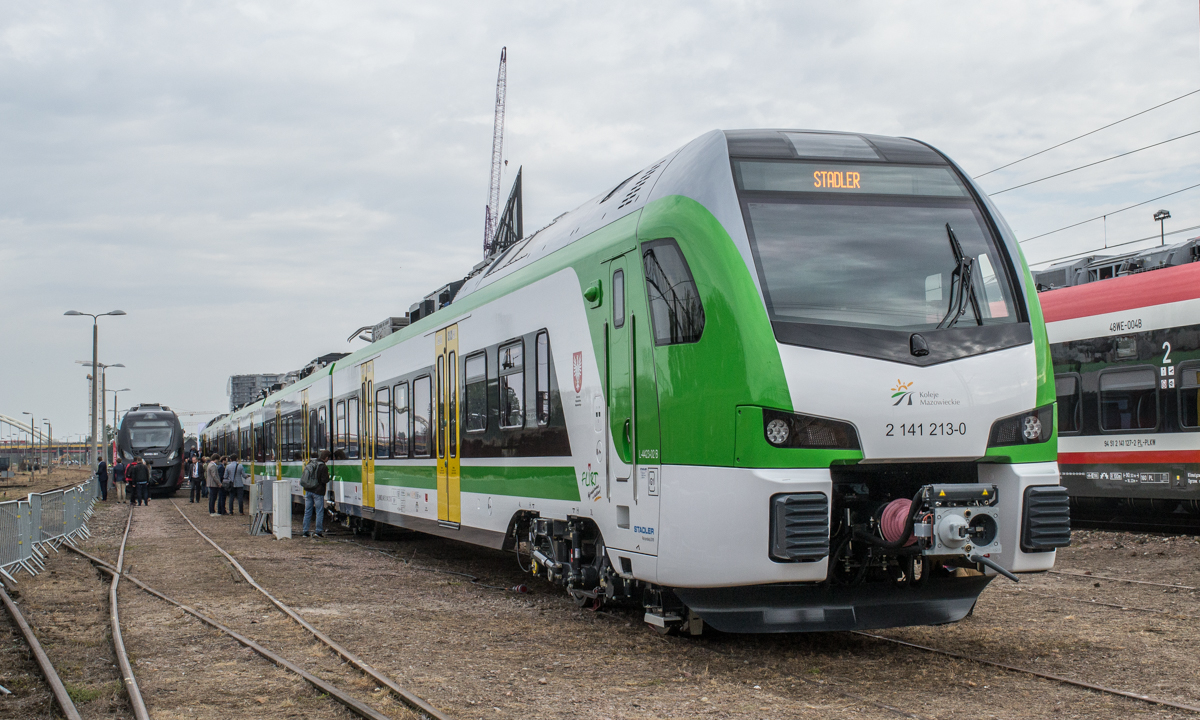
Flirt 3 for Masovian Railways

The 13th International Railway Fair Trako 2019 was held from 24 to 27 September 2019 at AmberExpo. The honorary patron of the fair was the Minister of Infrastructure. The event hosted 647 exhibitors from 32 countries. Rolling stock as well as track machines and equipment were once again displayed in front of the AmberExpo building and on the tracks near the Gdańsk Stadion Expo railway station. One of the most important highlights of the edition was the premiere of the first hybrid train on the Polish market, presented by Newag. The project was kept secret until the last moment. The Education and Career Day, held on the last day of the event, was organized for the second time in the fair's history. On the same day, a meeting between the Rail Passenger Rights Ombudsman and passengers took place.

Awards and competitions:

- Ernest Malinowski award:
  - Rolling stock and its components: Newag
  - IT and telematic systems for rolling stock: Rail-Mil Computers
  - Technical and technological innovations applied to rolling stock: Iris-GmbH infrared & intelligent sensors
  - Distinctions: Track Tec, Ente, Przedsiębiorstwo Usługowo-Techniczne GRAW
- Józef Nowkuński award:
  - Infrastructure and transport systems: Bombardier Transportation (ZWUS)
  - Technical-organizational projects and IT/telematic systems in infrastructure: Łódź Agglomeration Railway
  - Distinctions: Elester-PKP, Medcom, Firma Wielobranżowa i Projektowa Monat
- Jan Podoski award:
  - Rolling stock for urban transport: Modertrans Poznań
  - Parts, components, and rolling stock equipment: Medcom
  - Power and electrical infrastructure: Elester-PKP
  - Distinctions: Stadler Polska, Mabo
- Association of Communication Engineers and Technicians of the Republic of Poland Czesław Jaworski award:
  - Vehicles: Medcom
  - Infrastructure: Elester-PKP
  - Distinctions: Kuca, Rail-Mil Computers, Corail TS
- Most attractive TRAKO exhibition:
  - Stands up to 30 m²: Arex, Thermo King, TK Telekom
  - Stands over 30 m²: Ministry of Infrastructure, Railway Institute, Center for EU Transport Projects, Office of Rail Transport, Newag, Track Tec
- Socially Responsible Railway Company award: Enika, PKP Energetyka
  - Distinctions: DB Cargo, Greater Poland Railways, Newag, Siemens Mobility
- Rzeczpospolita and logistyka.rp.pl award: Medcom, Track Tec, PKP Cargo, PKP Energetyka
- Association of Polish Electrical Engineers President's jubilee medals: Dorota Daszkowska – TRAKO project director, Elester-PKP, Railway Communications Works

Rolling stock presented:

- Poznań Municipal Transport Company: BSI Type I #15, Carl Weyer
- Stadler: Tango NF2, ER160-02 Flirt
- Pesa: Twist 2015N, 48WE-004 Elf II
- Modertrans: Moderus Gamma LF 03 AC BD
- PKP Intercity: EU160-003 Griffin, 174A, 141A-20, 140A-10, 111A-20
- Bombardier: 594 001 Traxx DC3
- PKP Cargo: ET26-001 Dragon 2
- Plasser & Theurer: 09-3X track tamping machine
- Newag: 36WEh-001 Impuls

=== 2021 ===
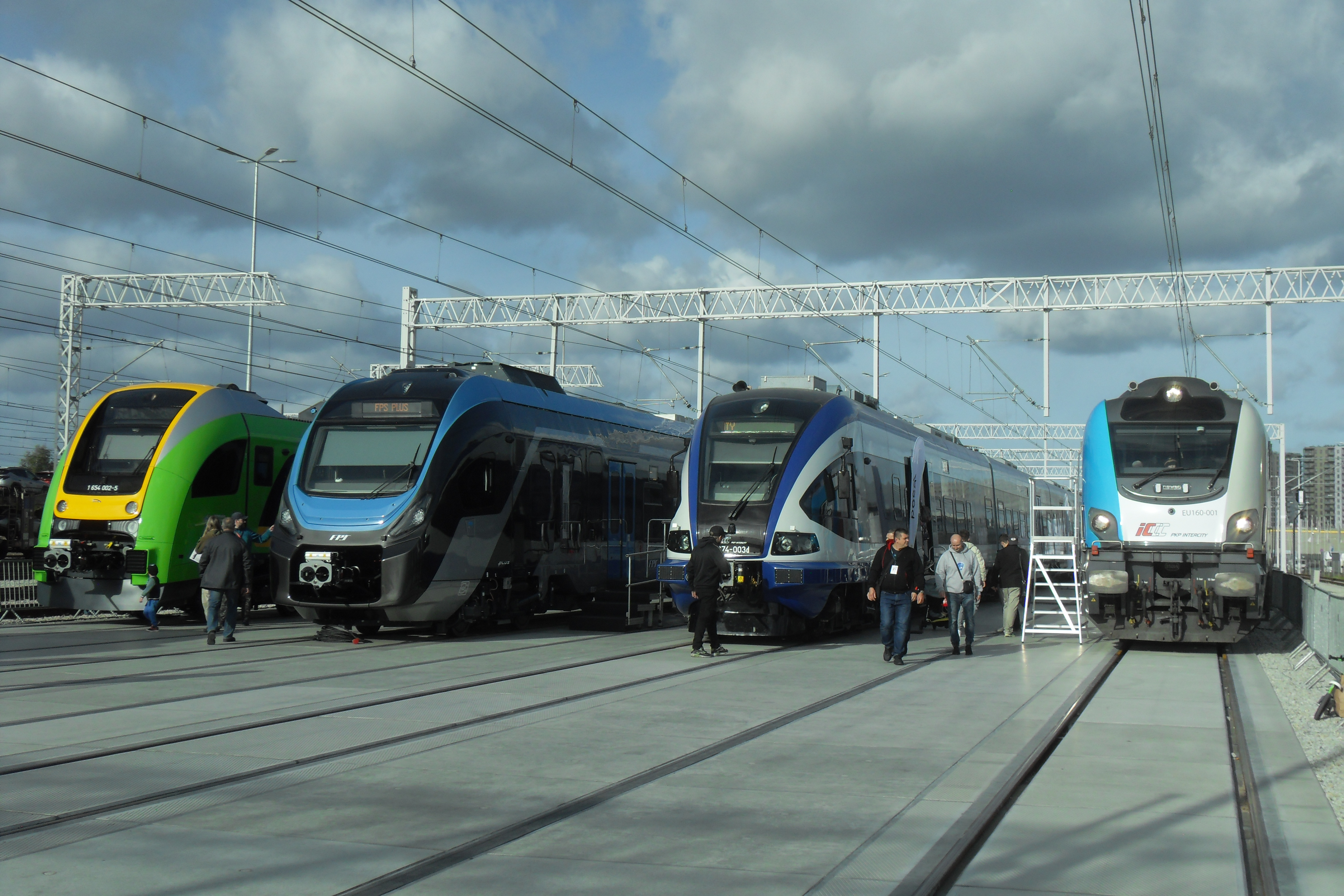
Trako 2021

The 14th International Railway Fair Trako 2021 was held from 21 to 24 September 2021, as usual at the AmberExpo complex at 11 Żaglowa Street in Gdańsk. This was the first year in which TRAKO and Innotrans were scheduled to take place in the same year, rather than, as before, alternating every two years; the events were planned separately, with a short break between them. The fair was conducted on the modernized tracks of Gdańsk Główny–Gdańsk Brzeźno railway, which positively affected visitor comfort and the exhibition area. As usual, debates, conferences, seminars, and presentations were held during the fair.
