= Newag Gliwice =

Former rail vehicle manufacturer

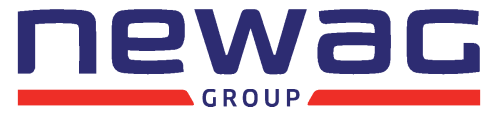
- Type: Private
- Founded: October 1, 1904; 121 years ago
- Defunct: February 2, 2015
- Headquarters: Gliwice; 58 Chorzowska Street, Poland
- Key people: Bartosz Krzemiński (president); Katarzyna Ziółek (chairwoman of the supervisory board)
- Total equity: 4,476,772.05 PLN
- Number of employees: 398 (2014)
- Website: newag.pl

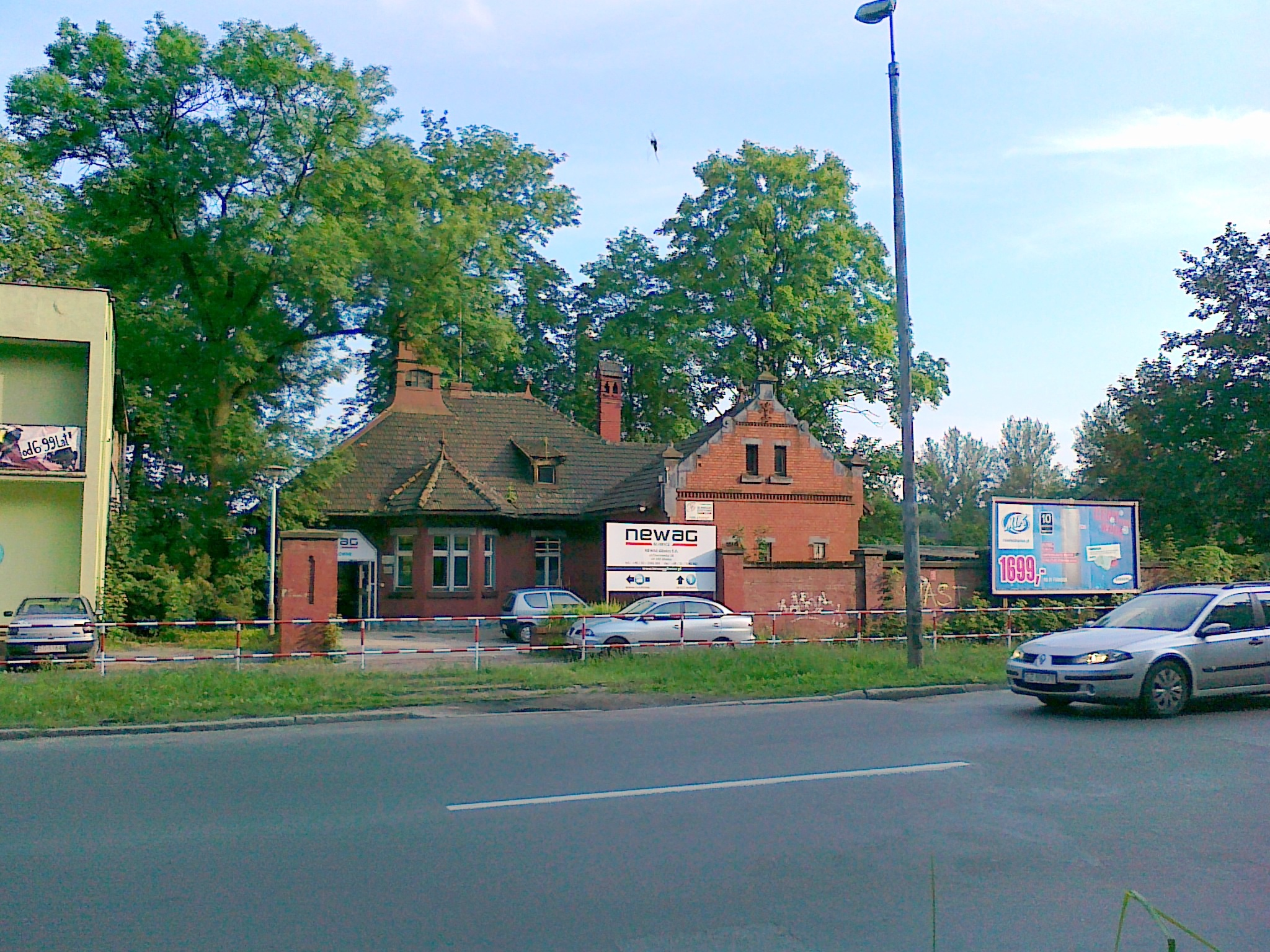
Main entrance to the factory premises

Newag Gliwice is a defunct enterprise based in Gliwice, Poland, engaged in the production, modernisation, and repair of railway rolling stock, particularly electric locomotives. In 2008, it became part of the Newag holding company, and on 2 February 2015, it was absorbed by the parent company as the "Remote Department for Electric Locomotive Production".

== History ==
=== Origins ===
On 3 June 1836, the Silesian bourgeoisie established the Founding Committee of the Upper Silesian Railway (Oberschlesische Eisenbahn), led by Count Püchler, president of Oppeln. Due to disputes over the route eastward from Opole, construction began only on the section from Wrocław Górnośląski to Opole Zachodnie, completed on 29 May 1843. The final route from Opole to Nowy Bieruń via Gliwice was approved in October 1842. The section to Gliwice opened on 2 October 1845, followed two weeks later by the extension to Świętochłowice. Construction concluded on 3 October 1846 in Mysłowice, though the planned link to Bieruń was never built. The line spanned 196.3 km, and its opening was officiated by Prussian King Frederick William IV.

On 8 November 1855, the line from Gliwice to Ruda Wschodnia and Ruda Chebzie (now Ruda Wschodnia–Gliwice Sośnica railway) opened, making Gliwice a junction station. On 27 October 1872, a new route to Bytom was added. By 1880, the total length of standard-gauge industrial sidings reached 63 km, and additional tracks were built at Gliwice railway station to handle freight traffic. Soon after, a decision was made to construct a classification yard, transforming Gliwice into one of the largest stations in the German Empire, managed by 18 signal boxes and handling about 630 trains daily.

=== Royal Railway Locomotive Workshops ===
In 1891, the railway directorate in Wrocław devised a plan to build wagon and locomotive repair workshops in Gliwice. Construction began between 1894 and 1895 with the wagon repair facility. In 1899, another redevelopment of Gliwice railway station was planned, including a new classification yard northeast of the existing site and workshops specialised in locomotive repairs. That year, the railway signed an agreement with the Gliwice magistrate to purchase land, with the city also committing to build from 80 to 100 worker residences, a primary school, water supply, and street lighting.

The workshops opened on 1 October 1904, though completion extended to 1907. The Royal Railway Locomotive Workshops (Königliche Eisenbahn-Lokomotivwerkstätte) comprised a main locomotive repair hall, machine shop, boiler house, forge, training workshops, and material warehouse. The main hall had 50 repair bays, with six more in a newly built roundhouse, which also housed a paint shop. Designed to service 300 steam locomotives stationed in the Katowice directorate, the workshops took over from auxiliary facilities in Katowice, whose staff were relocated to Gliwice. Only major and medium repairs were performed.

Between 1919 and 1921, the three Silesian uprisings and the Upper Silesia plebiscite resulted in most of industrial Silesia being awarded to Poland, but Gliwice remained in Germany. This reduced the workshops' operational scope, and a railway reorganisation in the Weimar Republic led to the formation of Deutsche Reichsbahn, causing about 800 job losses. In 1925, the Wrocław directorate assumed oversight, and despite protests and parliamentary intervention against further staff cuts that year, reductions continued.

In 1927, plans emerged to electrify the Wrocław–Gliwice line, potentially shifting the workshops to repair electric locomotives, but these were not realised. In 1933, after Hitler's rise to power, production intensified for war needs, boosting the Gliwice workshops. Employment grew, reaching 2,400 workers by the outbreak of war, with 60 steam locomotives repaired monthly.

During World War II, the facility became a forced labour camp, with Germans limited to administrative, technical, and supervisory roles. About 3,000 forced labourers of various nationalities, housed in the nearby park, performed most tasks. Monthly repairs rose to 120 steam locomotives, mostly war-damaged. By 1944, the workforce peaked at 4,000, operating in four shifts.

On 24 January 1945, Gliwice was captured by the Red Army. The workshops suffered heavy damage during the fighting; Germans had removed most machinery beforehand, and the Soviets destroyed what remained. Unfinished steam locomotives lingered in the repair bays.

=== Main Steam Locomotive Workshops ===
On 17 September 1945, the facility, renamed Main Steam Locomotive Workshops, was handed to Polish administration, and reconstruction began. In April 1947, the first post-war major repair of a steam locomotive was completed. On 1 January 1950, it became Mechanical Workshops No. 5 in Gliwice. At the time, Polish State Railways operated steam locomotives of 90 different series, necessitating additional spare parts production beyond domestic industry capacity. In 1951, a reorganisation merged it with nearby wagon workshops into the Rolling Stock Repair Plant. The combined facility produced track tamping machines, flat wagons, wagon buffers, acetylene generators, and chemical equipment. On 1 February 1957, it split into Steam Rolling Stock Repair Plant and Wagon Rolling Stock Repair Plant.

=== Electric Locomotive Repair Plant ===
In the early 1960s, steam locomotives were phased out for electric ones, prompting a shift in the plant's focus. Staff trained at facilities like ZNTK Mińsk Mazowiecki and ZNTK Lubań, and the plant's school adjusted its curriculum. On 14 July 1962, the first repaired electric locomotive, EU04-11, was delivered. Steam repairs continued until September 1970, with the last being Ty23-146. Reflecting this shift, the name changed to Electric Locomotive Repair Plant in early 1971. In February 1971, the 1,000th modernised electric locomotive left the plant. In 1974, it merged with nearby wagon workshops and three other plants, but split again in 1981.

On 31 March 1995, it became a sole-shareholder company of the State Treasury, and in 1999, Technics Engineering Architecture Marketing became the majority shareholder.

=== Newag Gliwice ===
In September 2008, Newag from Nowy Sącz became the majority shareholder of Electric Locomotive Repair Plant.

On 14 October 2009, at the Trako Fair in Gdańsk, the Electric Locomotive Repair Plant unveiled the freight electric locomotive E6ACT Dragon. It was Poland's first new electric locomotive design since the EM10 in 1990. On 12 October 2011, a contract was signed with STK in Wrocław for four Dragons.

On 20 February 2013, Electric Locomotive Repair Plant renamed itself Newag Gliwice.

On 30 January 2015, a leasing agreement for five Dragons was signed with Freightliner PL.

On 2 February 2015, Newag Gliwice was divided: key assets tied to rail vehicle production, repair, modernisation, and leasing transferred to Newag, forming the Remote Department for Electric Locomotive Production in Gliwice. Newag Gliwice retained a housing management unit, Gliwice Property Management. During this merger, Bartosz Krzemiński, former Newag Gliwice president, joined Newag's board.

In June 2016, production was slated to move to Nowy Sącz. On 28 July, 280 of 350 employees received layoffs. Between late 2016 and 2017, a new production hall was built in Nowy Sącz.

== Activities ==
The company produced new locomotives and modernised and repaired electric locomotives of all types used in Poland. Alongside Newag Nowy Sącz, it also modernised electric multiple units.

New locomotives
Type	Units	Delivery years	Recipient	Source
E4MSU Griffin	1	2012	prototype	
E6ACT Dragon	9	2009–2014	STK, Lotos Kolej	

Modernised locomotives
Type	Series	Units	Delivery years	Recipient	Sources
3E				Rail Transport and Stone Management Company, Orlen KolTrans, DB Schenker Rail Polska	
104Ec	EP09	34		PKP Intercity	
201Ek	ET22	20	2009–2011	PKP Cargo	
201El	ET22	17	2012	PKP Cargo	
201Em	ET22	28	2004–2010	PKP Cargo	
303Eb	EU07	23	2011	PKP Cargo	
303Eb	EP07	5	2012	Polregio	
303Ec	EU07	1	2012	PKP Cargo	
405Em	EM10	4	2004	PKP Cargo	
EL2				Adamów Coal Mine	

Produced locomotives
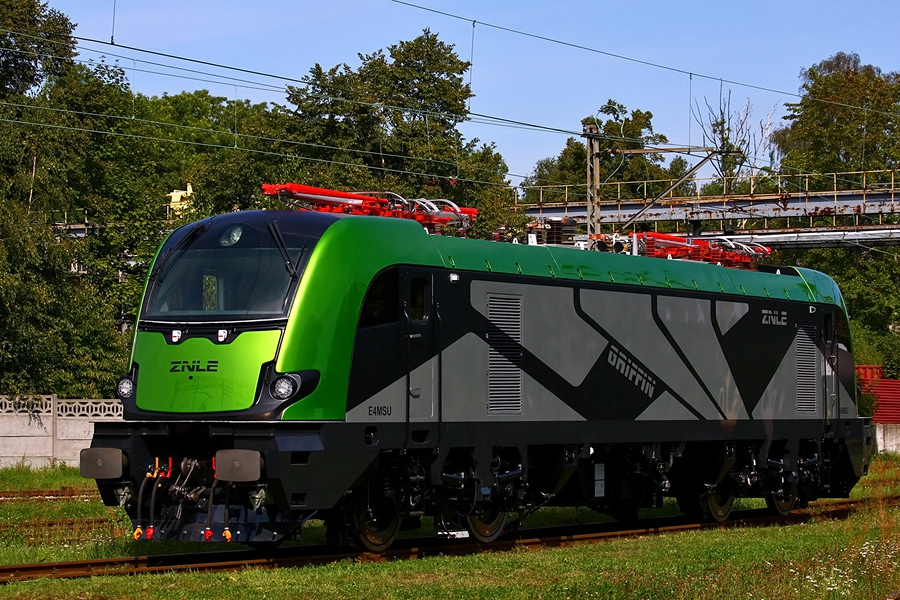
E4MSU Griffin

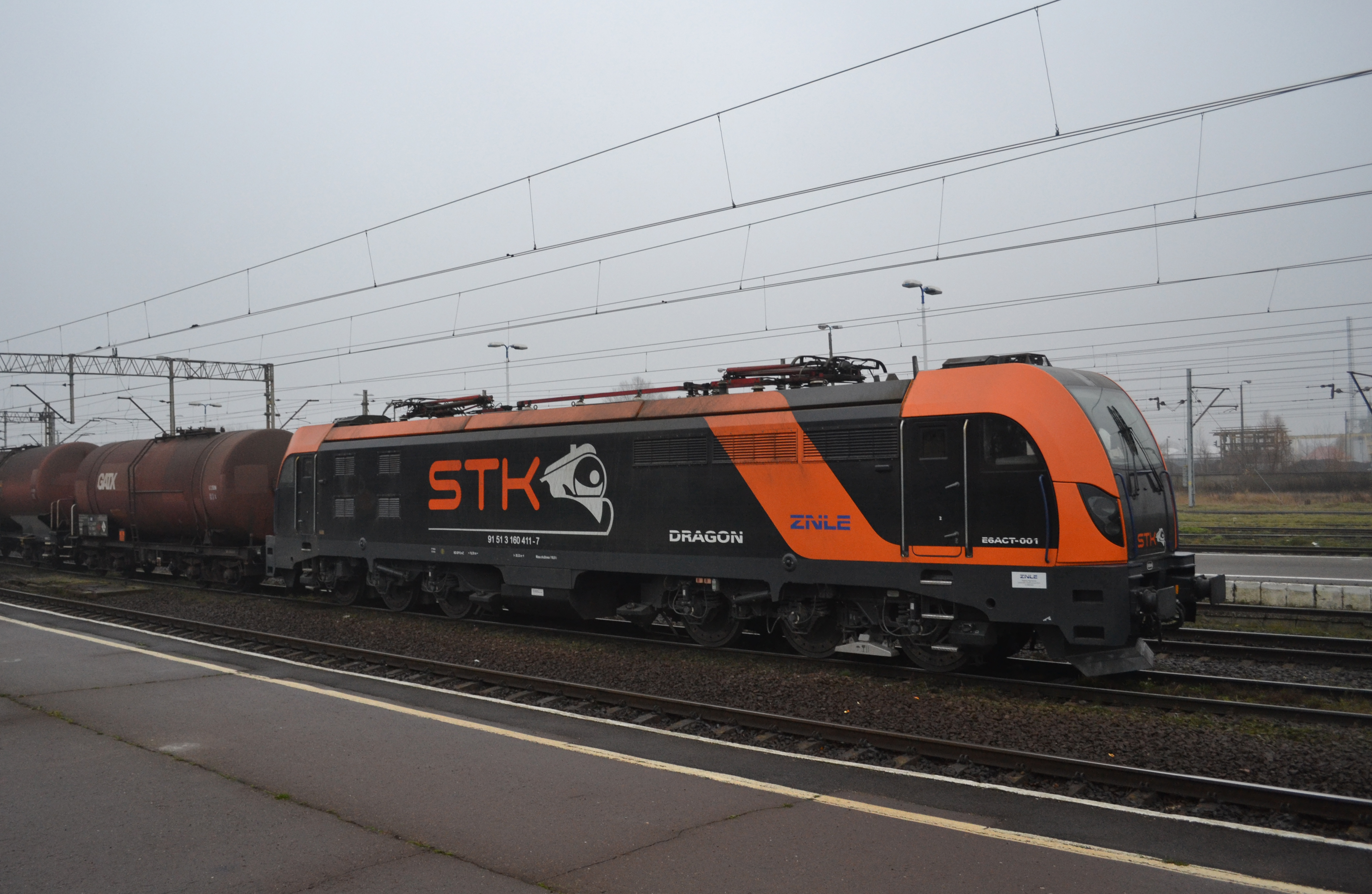
E6ACT Dragon
Modernised locomotives
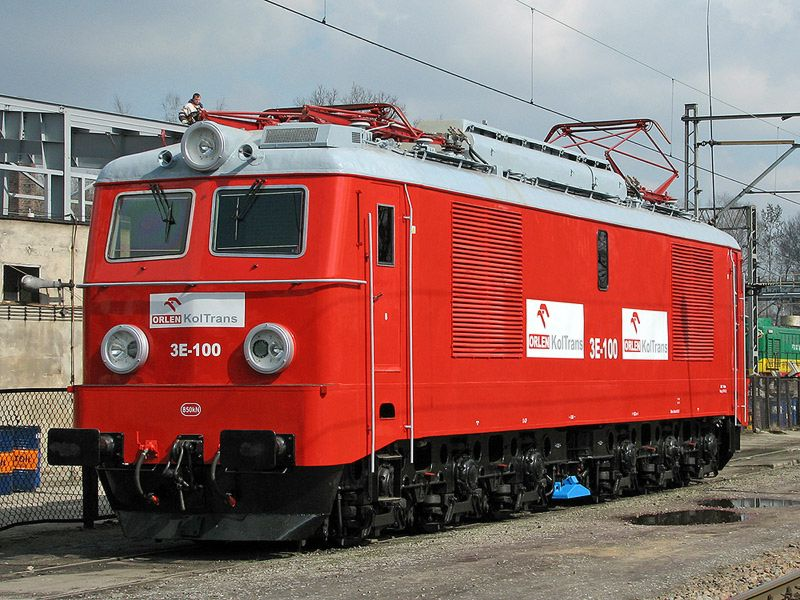
3E-100

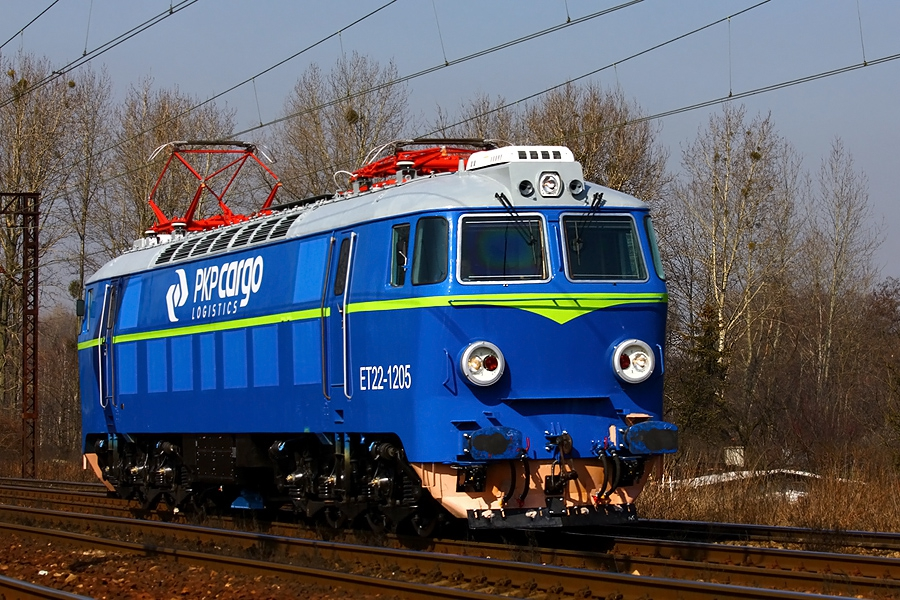
ET22 (201El)

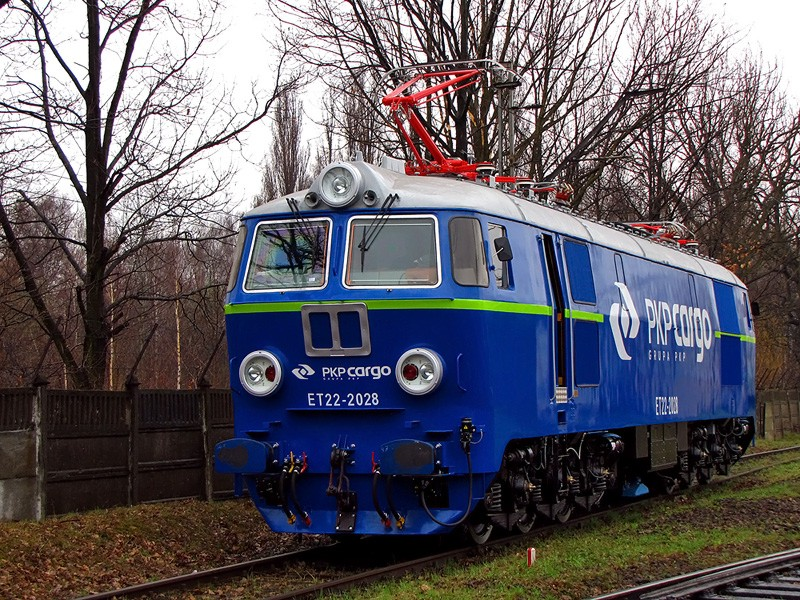
ET22 (201Ek)

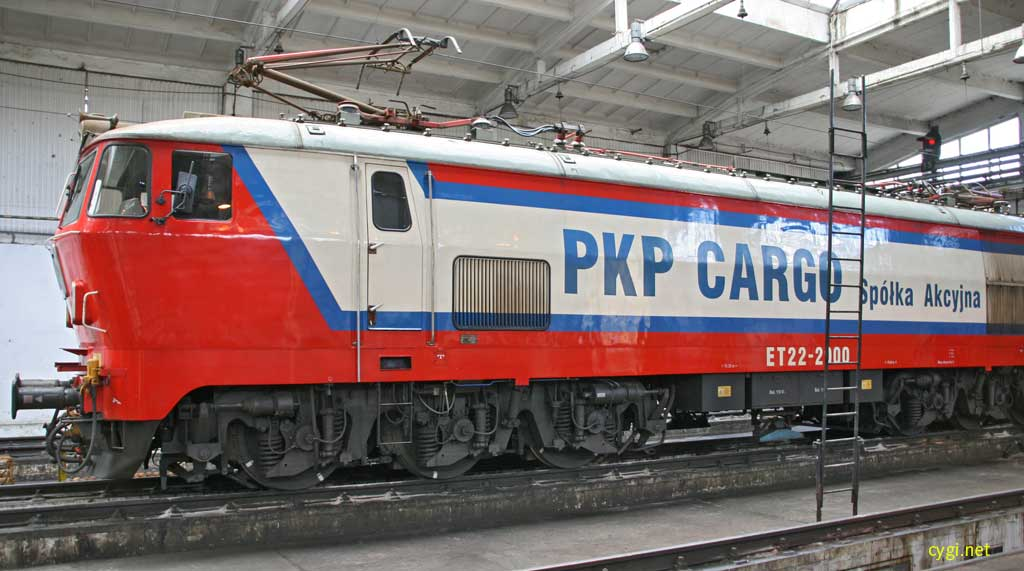
ET22 (201Em)

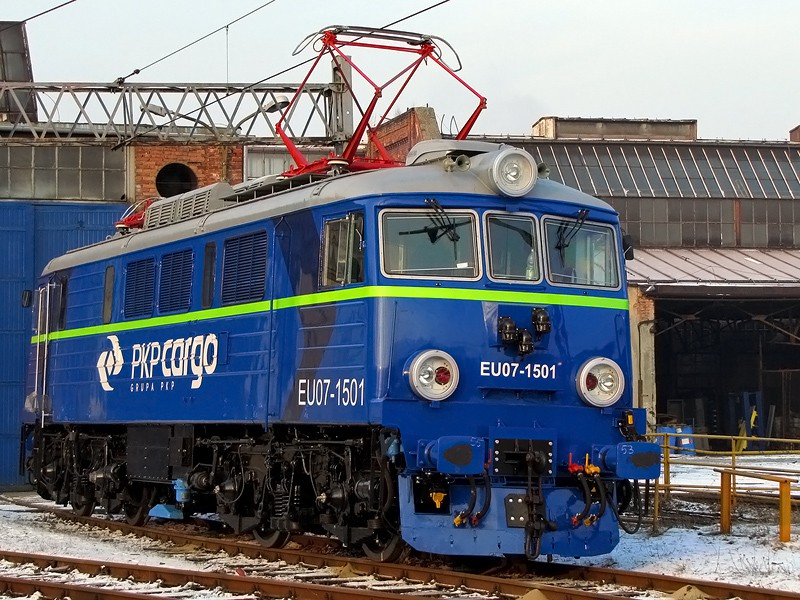
EU07 (303Eb)

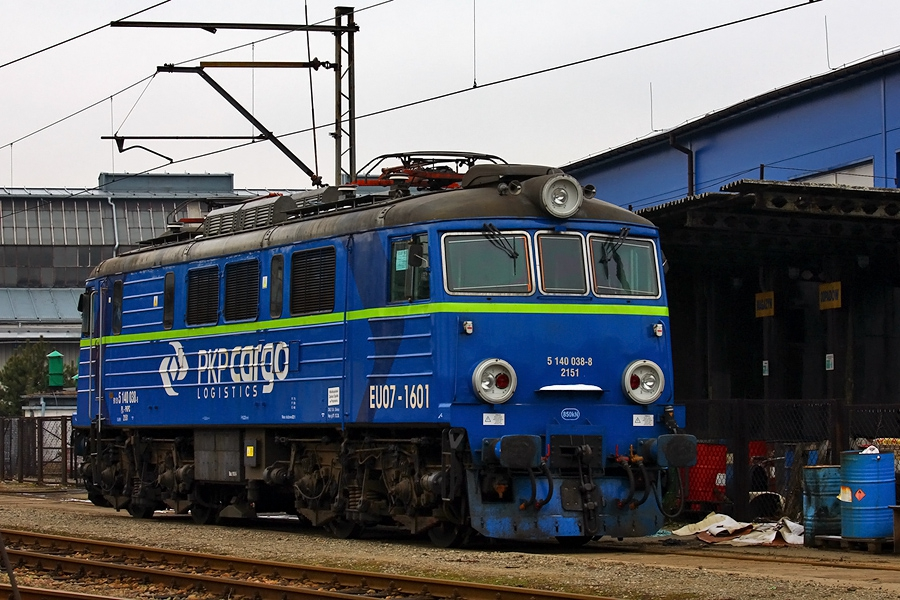
EU07 (303Ec)

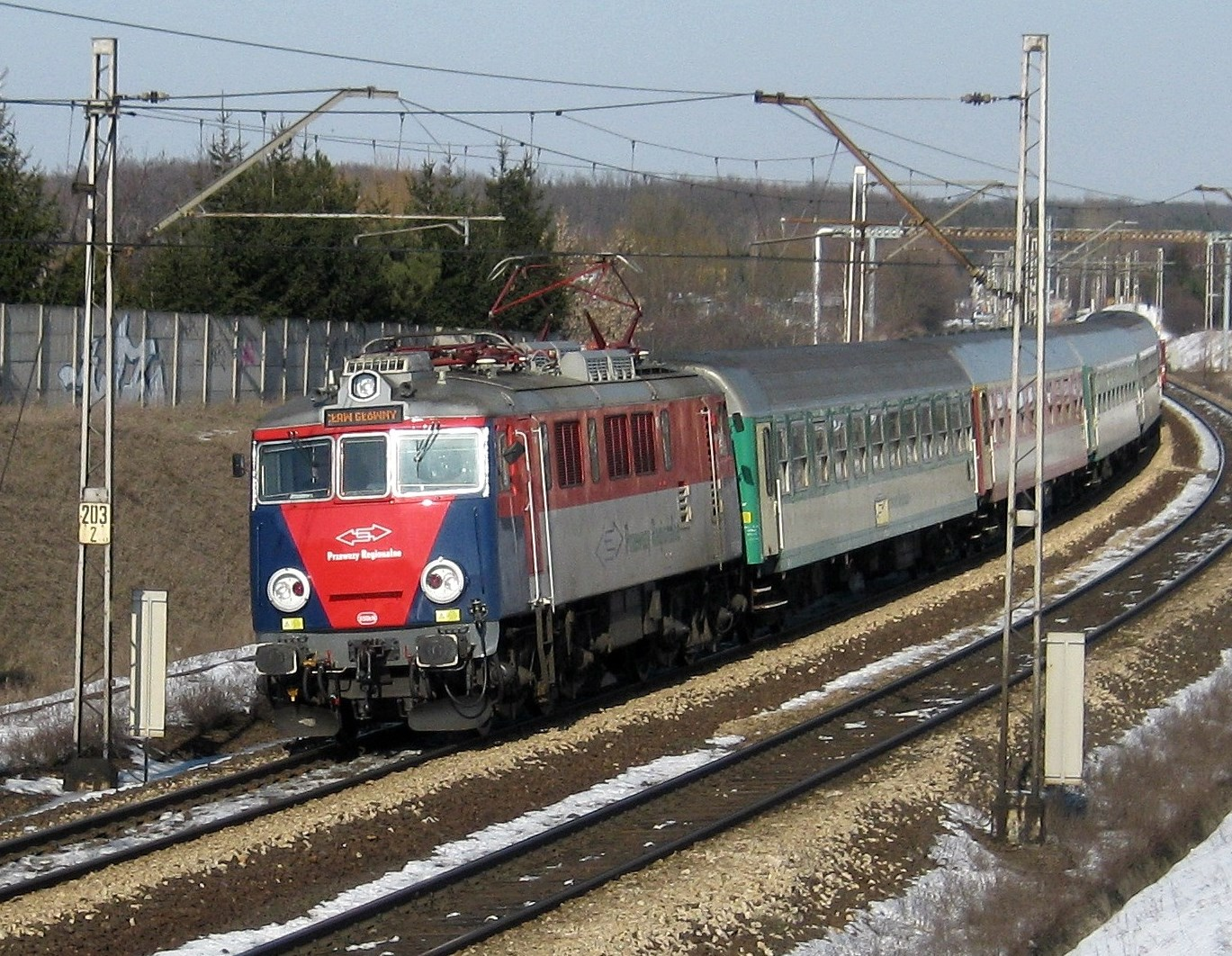
EP07P (303Eb)

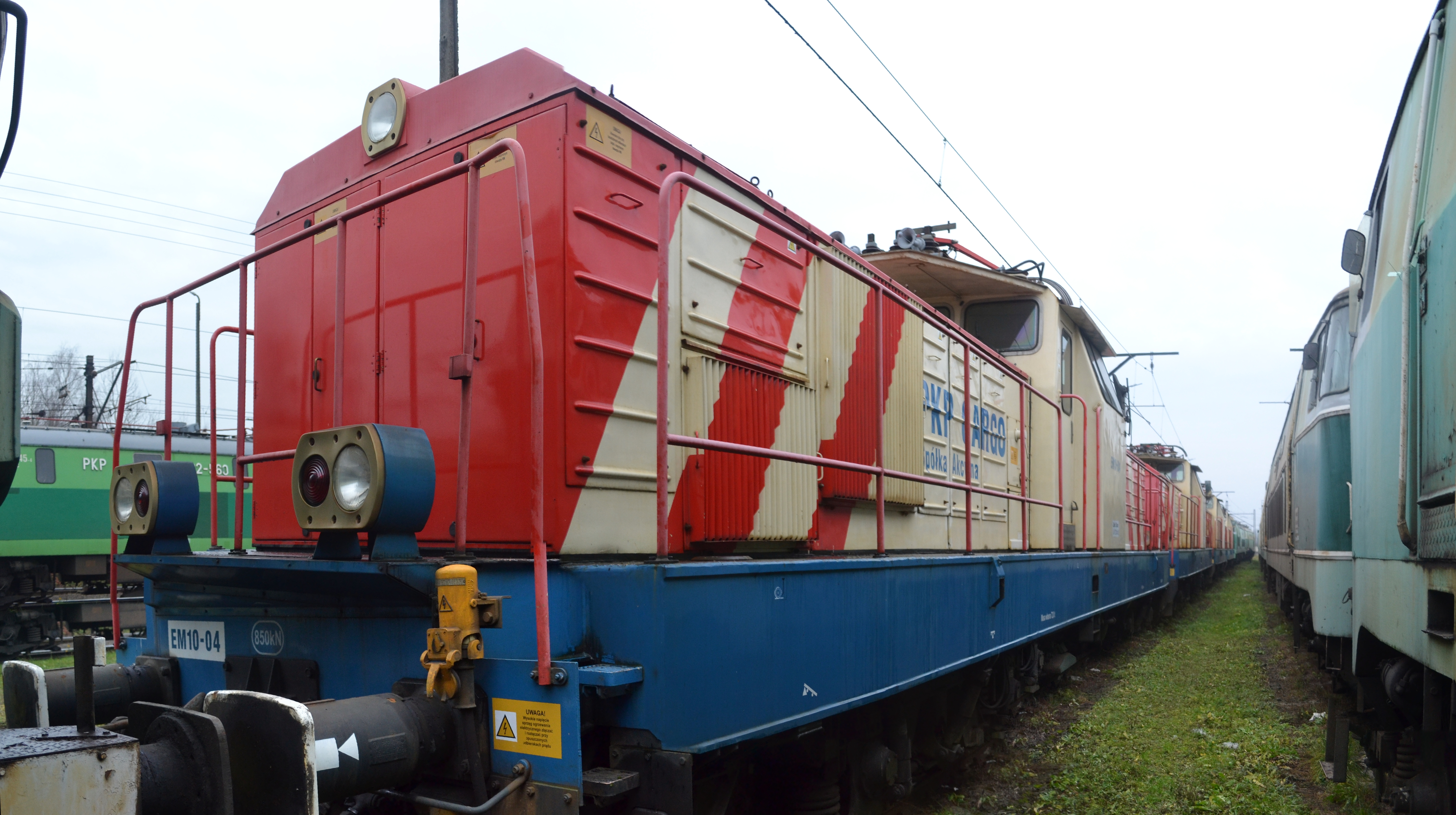
EM10 (405Em)

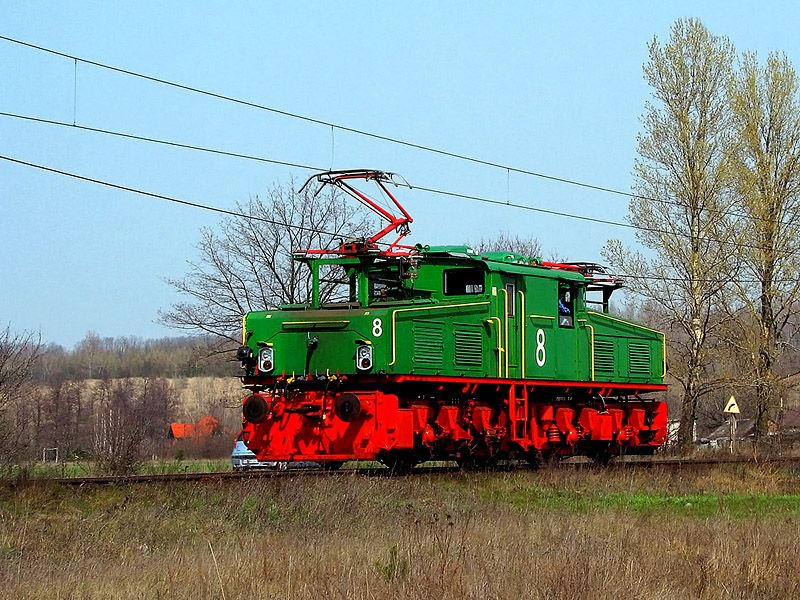
EL2

== Trade fair presentations ==
Year	Fair	Locomotive	Source
2003	Trako	3E/1	
2005	Trako	ET22-2000	
2009	Trako	E6ACT Dragon	
2010	InnoTrans	E6ACT Dragon	
2011	Trako	E6ACT Dragon	
2012	InnoTrans	E4MSU Griffin	
2013	Trako	E4MSU Griffin	

== Awards and honours ==
- 2009 – honourable mention in the Rolling Stock category at Trako for the E6ACT Dragon.
- 2014 – Caesar of Silesian Business title from Business Centre Club.
