= Newag Griffin =

Family of electric locomotives

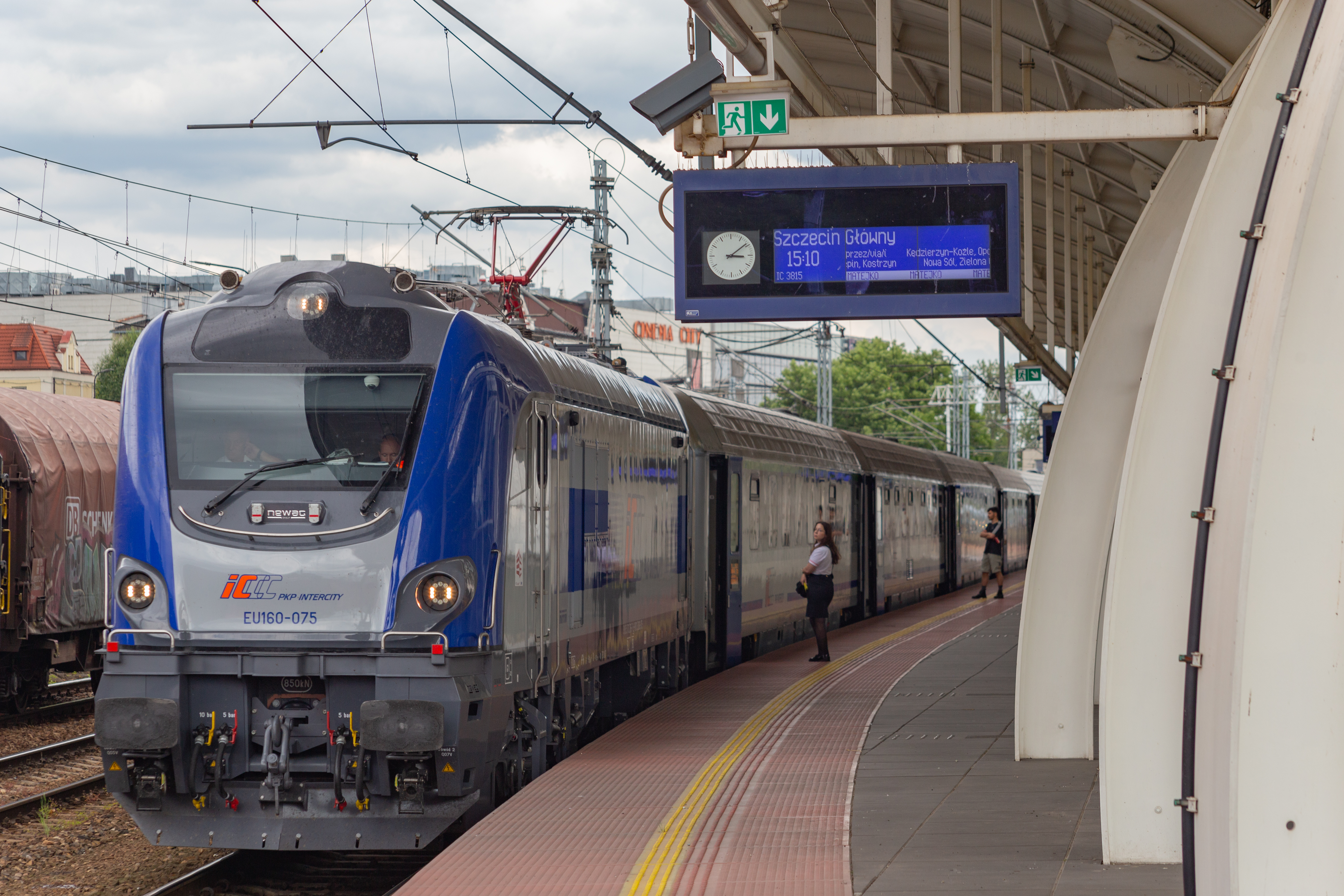
- PKP class EU160
Type and origin
- Power type: Electric; Diesel; Bi-mode
- Builder: Newag
- Total produced: 129
- Website: www.newag.pl/en/offer/griffin/
Specifications
- Configuration
  - UIC: Bo'Bo'
- Gauge: 1,435 mm (4 ft 8 1/2 in) standard gauge
- Length: 19,900 mm (65.3 ft)
- Loco weight: 79–88 t (78–87 long tons; 87–97 short tons)
- Electric system/s: DC 3 kV; AC dual mode 15 kV & 25 kV; MS triple mode 3 kV DC, 15 kV & 25 kV AC
Performance figures
- Maximum speed: 160 km/h (100 mph); E4MSUa: 200 km/h (125 mph)
- Power output: Electrics: 5.6 MW; Diesel: 2.3 MW; Bi-mode: 5.6 MW (electric) / 420 kW (diesel)
- Tractive effort
  - Starting: Electrics: 310 kN (70,000 lb_{f}); Diesel: 248 kN (56,000 lb_{f})
Career
- Operators: Logistics & Transport Company, Orlen KolTrans, Lotos Kolej, PKP Intercity
- Class: PKP Intercity: EU160, EU200
- Delivered: 2017–present

Newag Griffin is a series of Polish four-axle electric and diesel locomotives for working passenger and goods trains, produced by Newag in Nowy Sącz from 2012. The first version, the E4MSU is a mixed-traffic multi-system electric locomotive.

== History ==
=== Origin ===
In September 2010, the Newag Gliwice company in Poland began works on the universal electric locomotive platform Elephant. The series originally was planned to consist of two versions:

- E4ACU a mixed-traffic locomotive with a maximum speed of 140 km/h for regional passenger transportation and cargo.
- E4ACP a passenger locomotive with a maximum speed of 200 km/h.

The four-axle locomotives were to supplement the company's offer, and their multi-system capability would allow them to work international traffic and traffic in other European countries.

In January 2011, the project works by the company EC Engineering aimed to produce four versions of the locomotive:

- E4DCU – a mixed-traffic 3 kV DC locomotive with a maximum speed of 160 km/h.
- E4DCP – a passenger 3 kV DC locomotive with a maximum speed of 200 km/h.
- E4MSU – a mixed-traffic multi-system (3 kV DC, 15 kV AC and 25 kV AC) locomotive with a maximum speed of 160 km/h.
- E4MSP – a passenger multi-system (3 kV DC, 15 kV AC and 25 kV AC) locomotive with a maximum speed of 200 km/h.

Newag planned to produce the E4MSU version first. It was to be tested in the third quarter of 2012.

In March 2011 the works on the mixed-traffic version were in their final stages and the official presentation of the locomotive was planned for the autumn 2011 during the Trako Trade Fair in Gdańsk. The presentation did not eventuate as the project works were still in progress and it was pushed back to 2012.

=== Production and tests ===
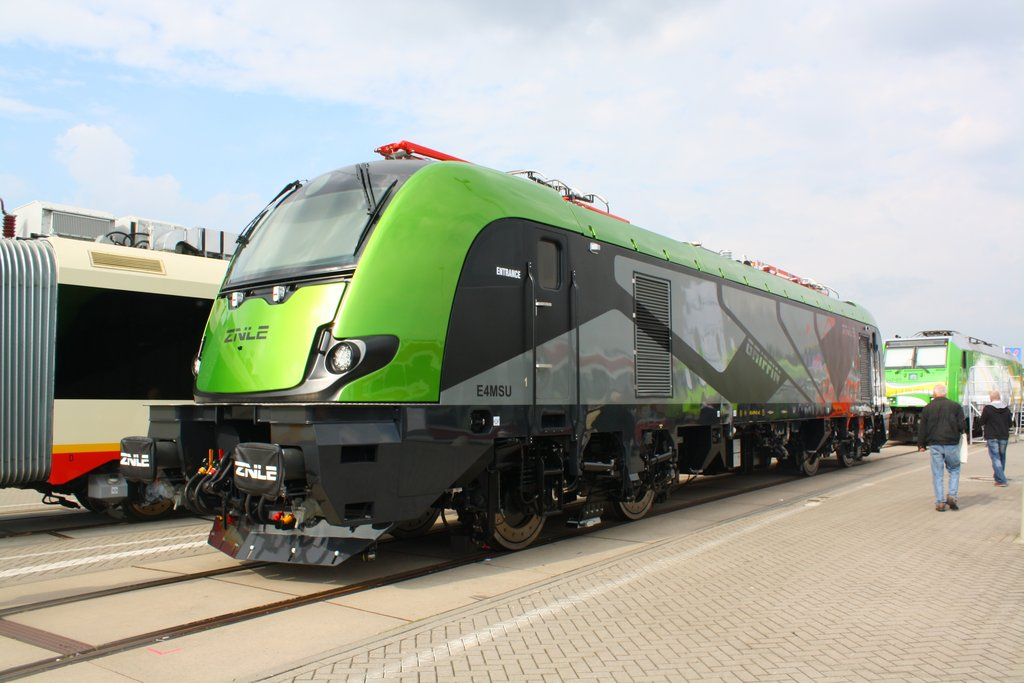
The Newag Griffin during InnoTrans Trade Fair in 2012.

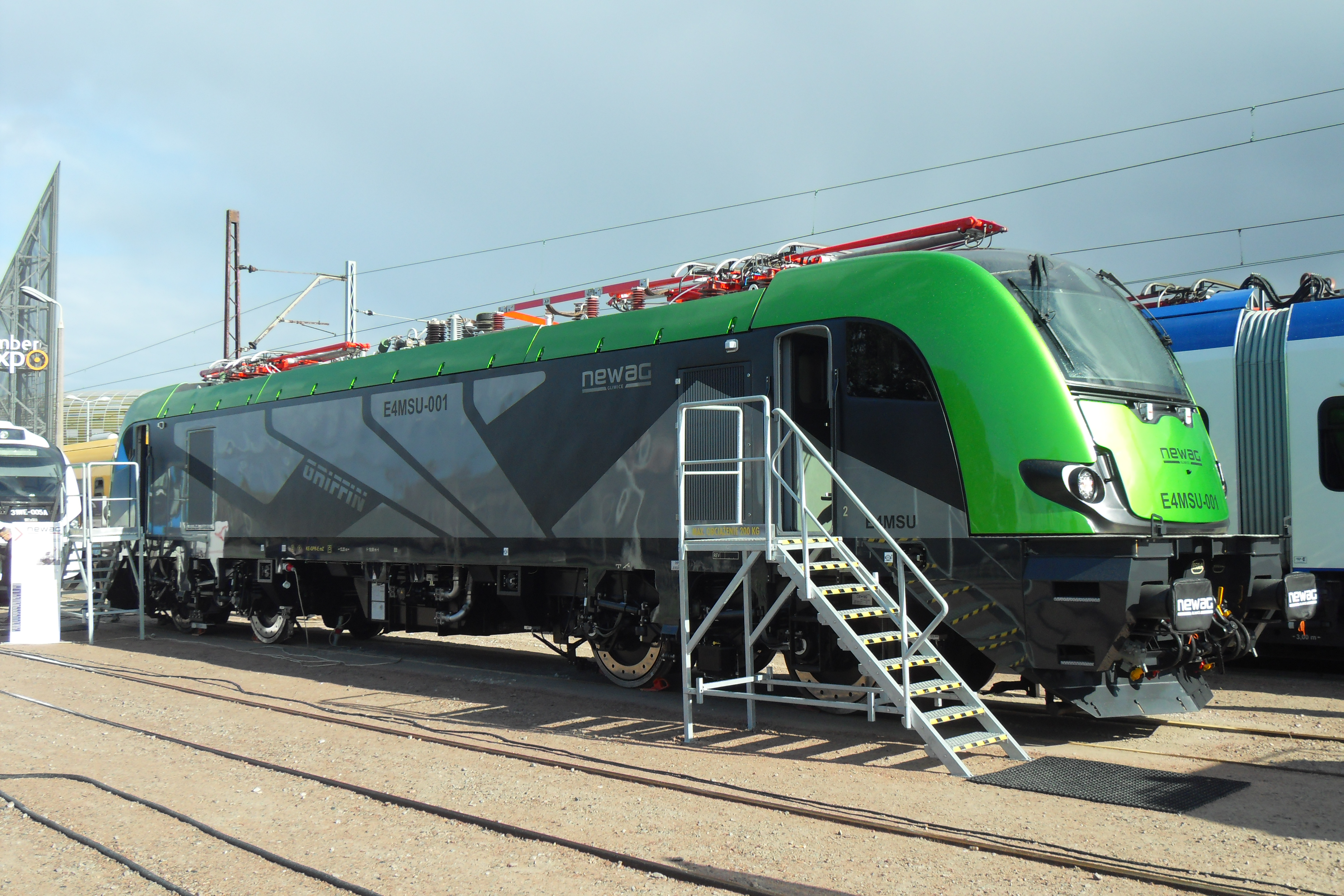
The Newag Griffin during Trako Trade Fair in 2013.

The E4MSU locomotive was unveiled on 18 September 2012 at the InnoTrans Trade Fair in Berlin. At the end of April 2013 the locomotive was transported to the Railway Institute's test track near Żmigród where the testing on the locomotive began. On 16 May 2013 the locomotive together with two carriages began being used by PKP Intercity in Nowy Sącz, and in the following days the locomotive was tested at the Olsztyn – Nidzica railway line (where the turning of the locomotive was tested). The locomotive returned to the south of the country, where at the beginning of June 2013 had passed the static tests at the Kraków Railway Institute, then the locomotive was sent to Żmigród. Between 18 and 31 July 2013 PKP Cargo conducted a driving test which is necessary to obtain a certificate for the locomotive. On 28 May 2014 Newag signed a contract with Đuro Đaković Specijalna Vozila for the joint construction of the electric locomotive E4ACU type, which included technology transfer and exchange of know-how in the area of the production of electric locomotives.

== Deliveries ==
| State | Operator | Type | Stock Nos. | Number delivered |
|---|---|---|---|---|
| Poland | Logistics & Transport Company | E4MSU | 001 | 1 |
| Poland | Orlen Kolej | E4DCUd | 001–005 | 5 |
| Poland | Orlen Kolej | E4DCU | 031 | 1 |
| Poland | PKP Intercity | E4DCU/EU160 | 001–030,032-097 | 96 |
| Poland | PKP Intercity | E4MSUa/EU200 | 001–078 | 26 out of 110 |

== Construction ==
=== Available ===
| Version | Supply | Continuous power | Maximum speed | Starting tractive effort | Service weight | Maximum axle load |
|---|---|---|---|---|---|---|
| E4DCU | 3 kV DC | 5.6 MW | 160 km/h | 310 kN | 79 t | |
| E4DCP | 3 kV DC | 5.6 MW | 200 km/h | 310 kN | 79 t | |
| E4ACU | 15 kV AC; 25 kV AC | 5.6 MW | 160 km/h | 310 kN | 84 t | 208 kN |
| E4ACP | 15 kV AC; 25 kV AC | 5.6 MW | 200 km/h | 310 kN | 84 t | 208 kN |
| E4MSU | 3 kV DC; 15 kV AC; 25 kV AC | 5.6 MW | 160 km/h | 310 kN | 88 t | 220 kN |
| E4MSP | 3 kV DC; 15 kV AC; 25 kV AC | 5.6 MW | 200 km/h | 310 kN | 88 t | 220 kN |
| D4MSU | Diesel | 2.3 MW | 160 km/h | 248 kN | 79 t | 196 kN |

=== Driver's cab ===
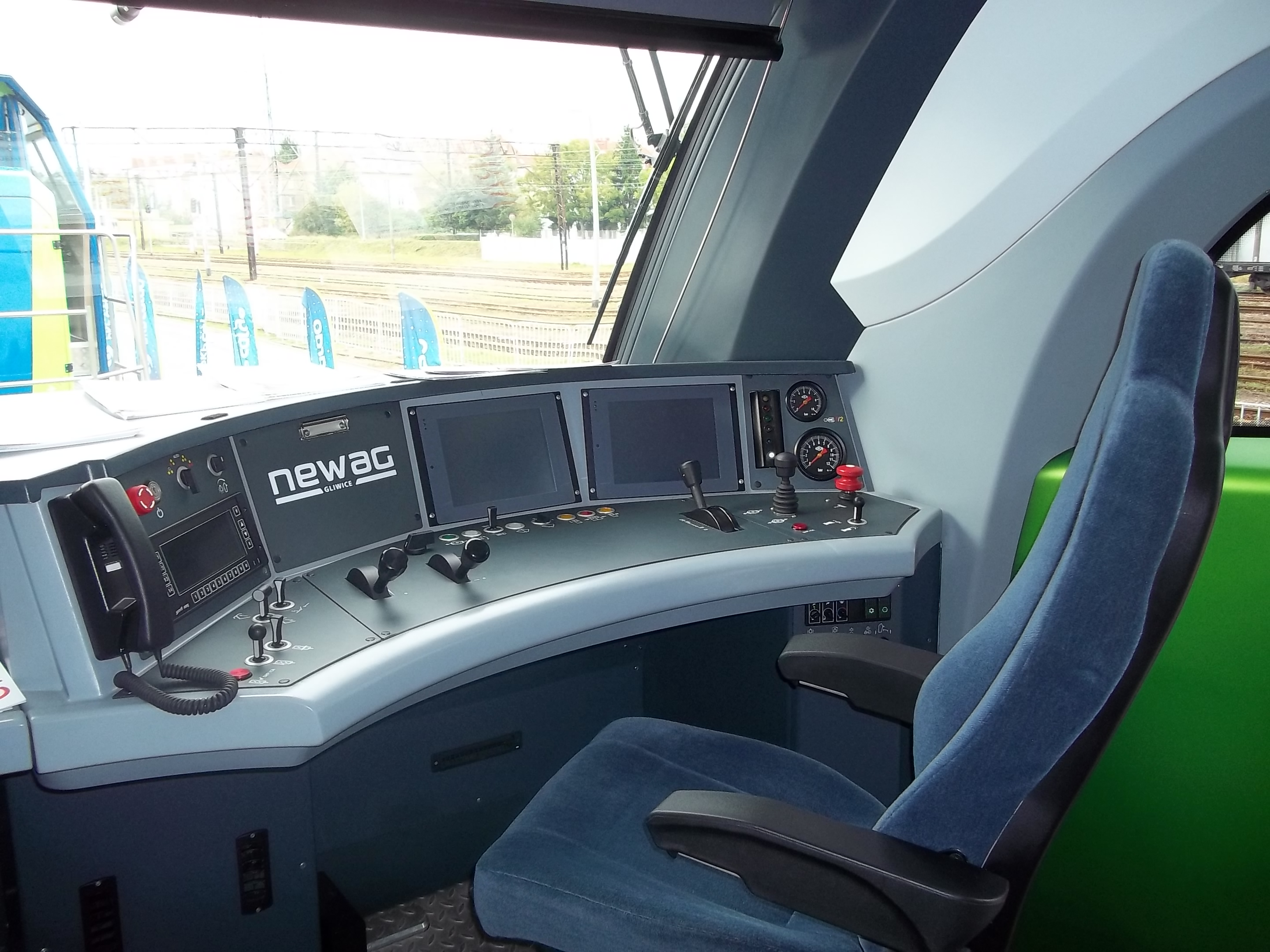
The driver's cab.

The driver's cab can accommodate two drivers. Each cab is equipped with two independent panels that display the drive parameters, a diagnostics module and event recorder with a speedometer function, a two-module climate control system and rear-view mirrors with a monitor for four cameras. The cabin is in accordance with the EN 1527 standard.

== Nicknames ==
- Złom (eng. Scrap) - from being a replacement for EP07 and EU07 locomotives, where these locomotives were mostly loved by railway enthusiasts, the EU160 locomotives are sometimes hated by them.
- Gryfin (eng. Griffin) - from its name

== Accidents and incidents ==
- On 26 June 2026, unit 070 was involved in a rear-end collision after a Pesa Elf train collided into the rear carriages that were hauled by the locomotive. 11 people onboard the train suffered injures.

== Gallery ==
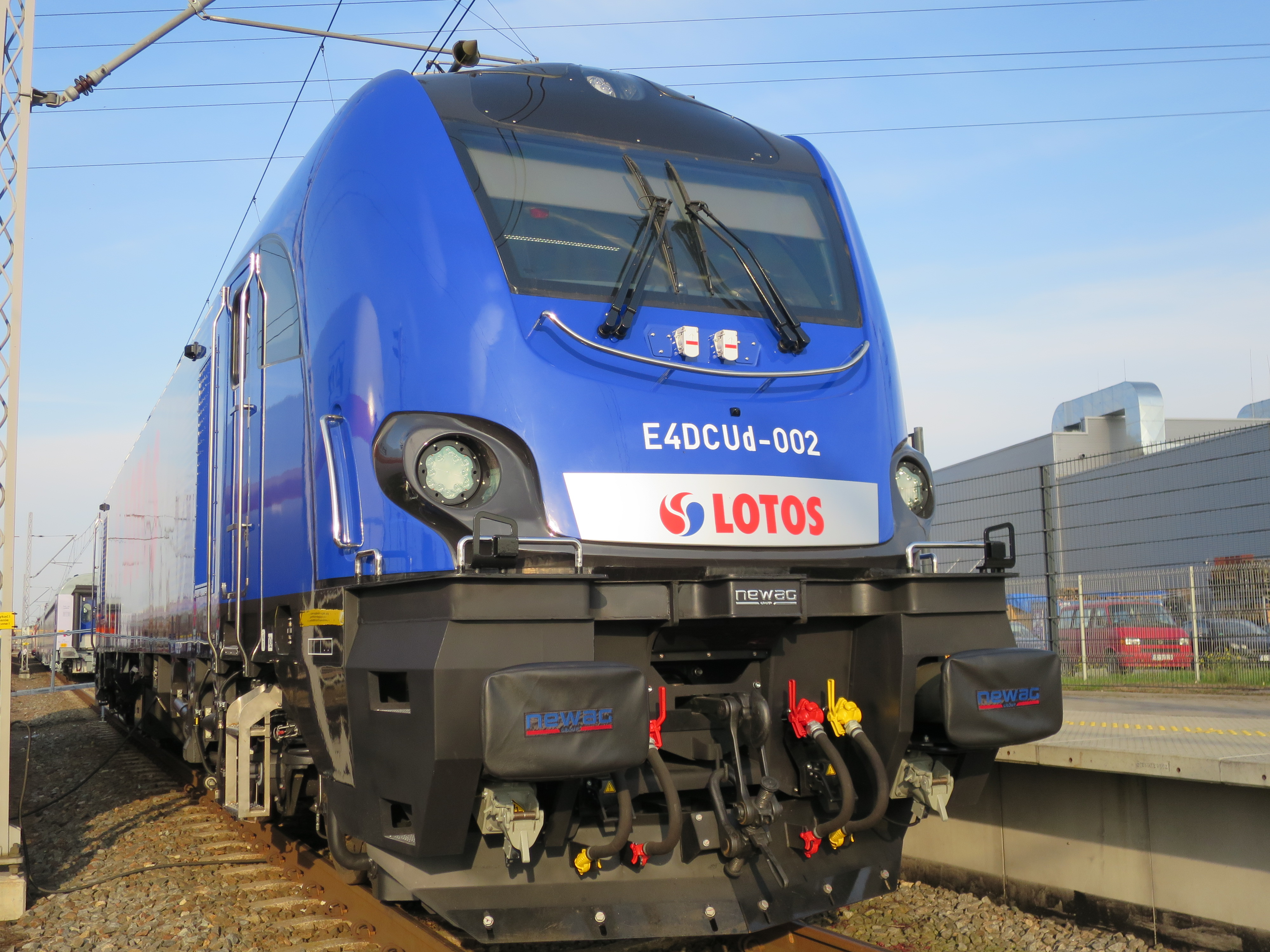
E4DCUd of Lotos Kolej

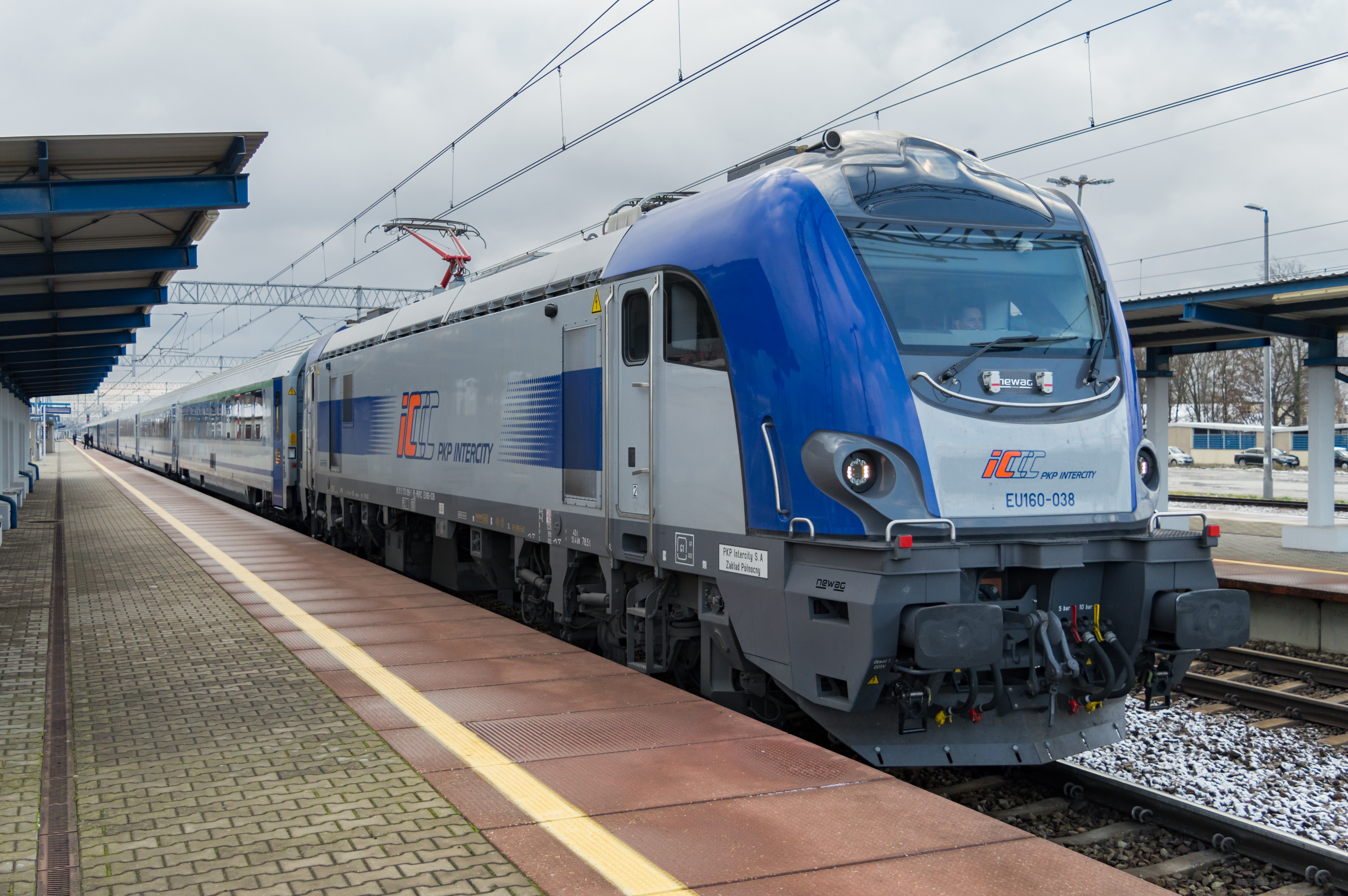
EU160 with PKP IC passenger train

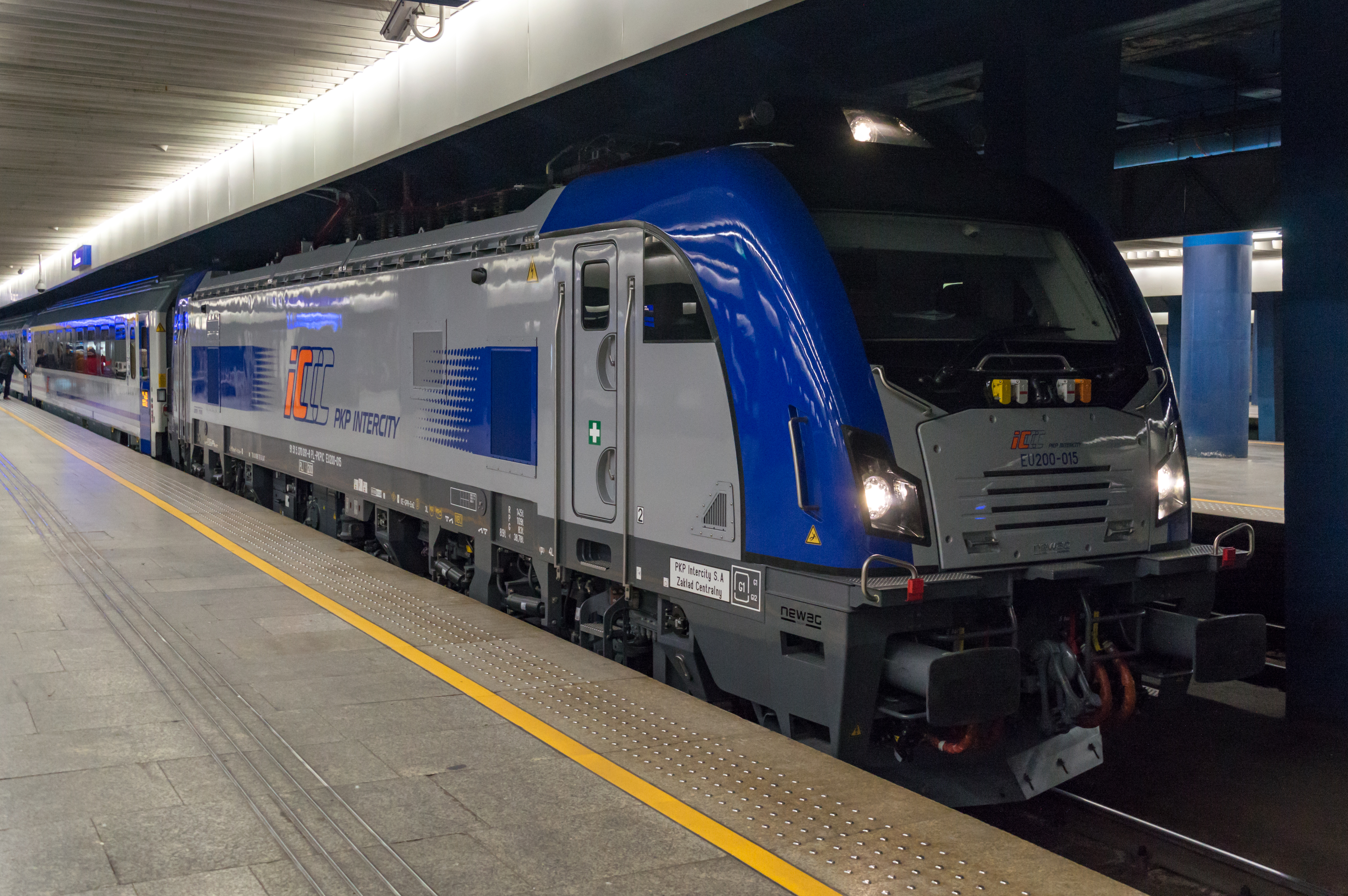
EU200 (E4MSUa) of PKP IC
