= LEW EL2 =

Electric locomotive

EL2
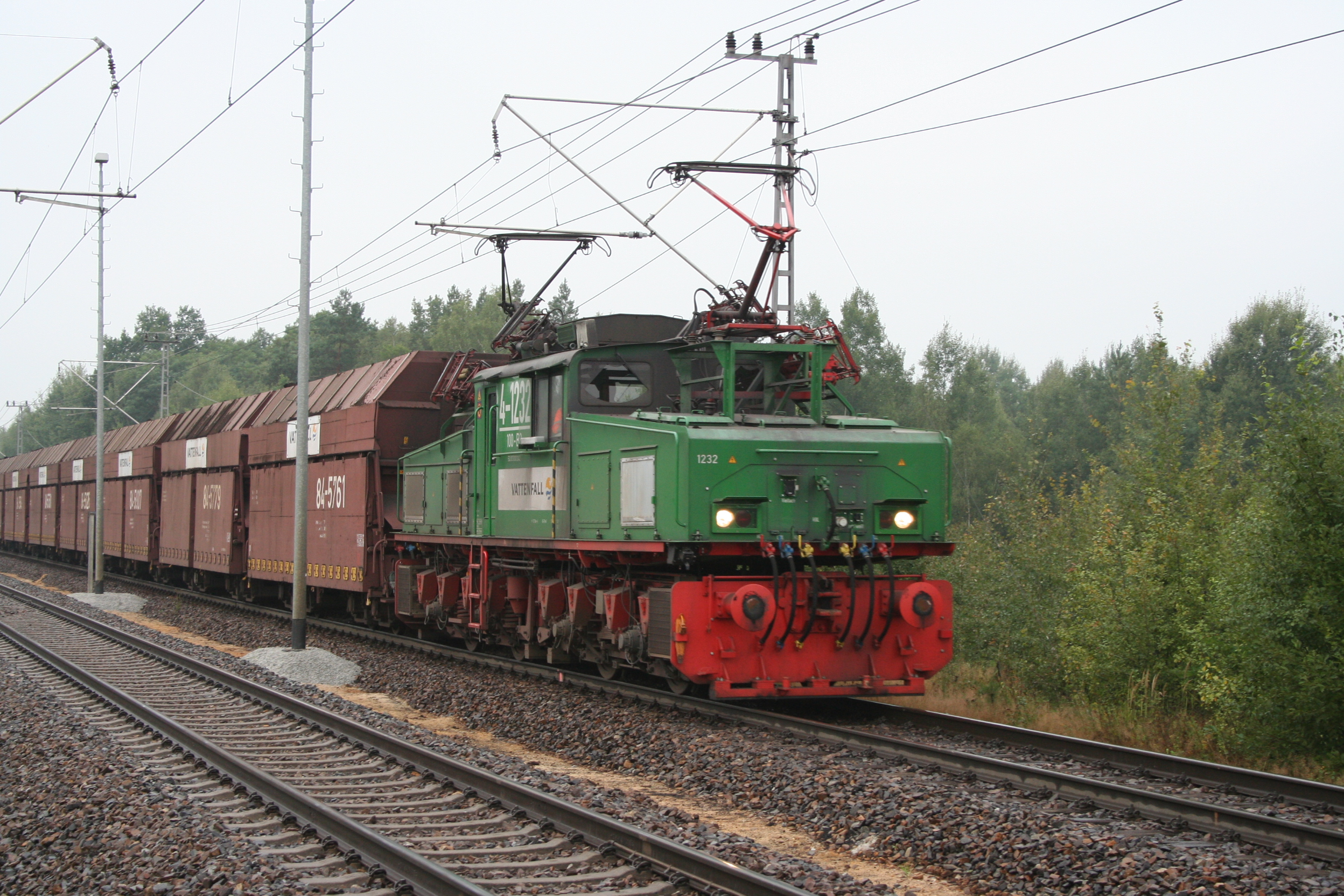
- LEW EL2
Type and origin
- Builder: LEW Hennigsdorf
- Build date: 1952–1988
Specifications
- Configuration
  - UIC: Bo'Bo'
- Wheel diameter: 1,120 mm (44 in)
- Length: 13,700 mm (540 in)
- Width: 3,100 mm (120 in)
- Height: 4,050 mm (159 in)
- Axle load: 294 kN (66,000 lb_{f})
- Loco weight: 100 t (98 long tons; 110 short tons)
- Engine type: GBM 330 or GBM 350
- Traction motors: electric
- Train brakes: Knorr/Oerlikon/Matrosow/Dako
Performance figures
- Maximum speed: 65 km/h (40 mph)
- Power output
  - 1 hour: 1,320 kW (1,790 PS) (4×330 kW (449 PS))
  - Continuous: 1,120 kW (1,520 PS) (4×280 kW (381 PS))

EL2 is an electric locomotive manufactured in the East German LEW Hennigsdorf plant from 1952 to 1988 for industrial railways.

== History ==
In the early 1950s, the Lokomotivbau Elektrotechnische Werke Hennigsdorf plant designed three types of electric locomotives for open-pit mines: the two-unit, standard- or broad-gauge EL1, the single-unit, standard- or broad-gauge EL2, and the single-unit, narrow-gauge (900 mm) EL3. The locomotive designs were based on AEG constructions from the late 1920s, significantly modernized during World War II.

== Design ==
=== Body ===
The EL2's body consists of welded sheet metal cladding attached to a frame made of profiles. It is reinforced with floor plates, beneath which ballast and cooling fans for the traction motors are mounted. The body rests on bogies via two supports and a piston pin located centrally on the bogies.

Before and behind the driver's cab are machinery compartments. Metal boxes containing starting resistor blocks are welded to the chassis. The entire structure is covered with sheet metal forming the EL2's body. The machinery compartments house cooling fans (connected via ventilation ducts) for the traction motors in the bogies. The front compartment contains a fast-acting circuit breaker, air compressors with air tanks, and a converter for the Leonard system, while the rear compartment holds resistors for the control stand.

=== Chassis and bogies ===
The locomotive is supported by two two-axle, welded bogies made of steel sheet. The cast steel wheel rims are 140 mm wide and 85 mm thick. Buffers and a chain coupler are attached to the front crossbeam at 1,020 mm above the rail profile, a bogie coupling to the rear crossbeam, and ballast is placed in the middle. Wheelsets are connected to the bogies with helical springs and to the body with leaf springs. Clearance in the front bogie's connections allows the locomotive to navigate the improvised tracks of open-pit mines. Traction motors, suspended "by the nose" in the bogie frames, transmit torque to the wheelsets via a helical gear with angled teeth.

Braking is provided by single-sided, cast-iron railway brakes operated by two air brakes. Each bogie has a separate system of levers and rods suspended from the rear frame. The rear bogie also features a handbrake. Depending on the customer, locomotives were equipped with various brake systems, including Oerlikon, Knorr-Bremse, Dako, and Matrosov.

=== Drive system ===
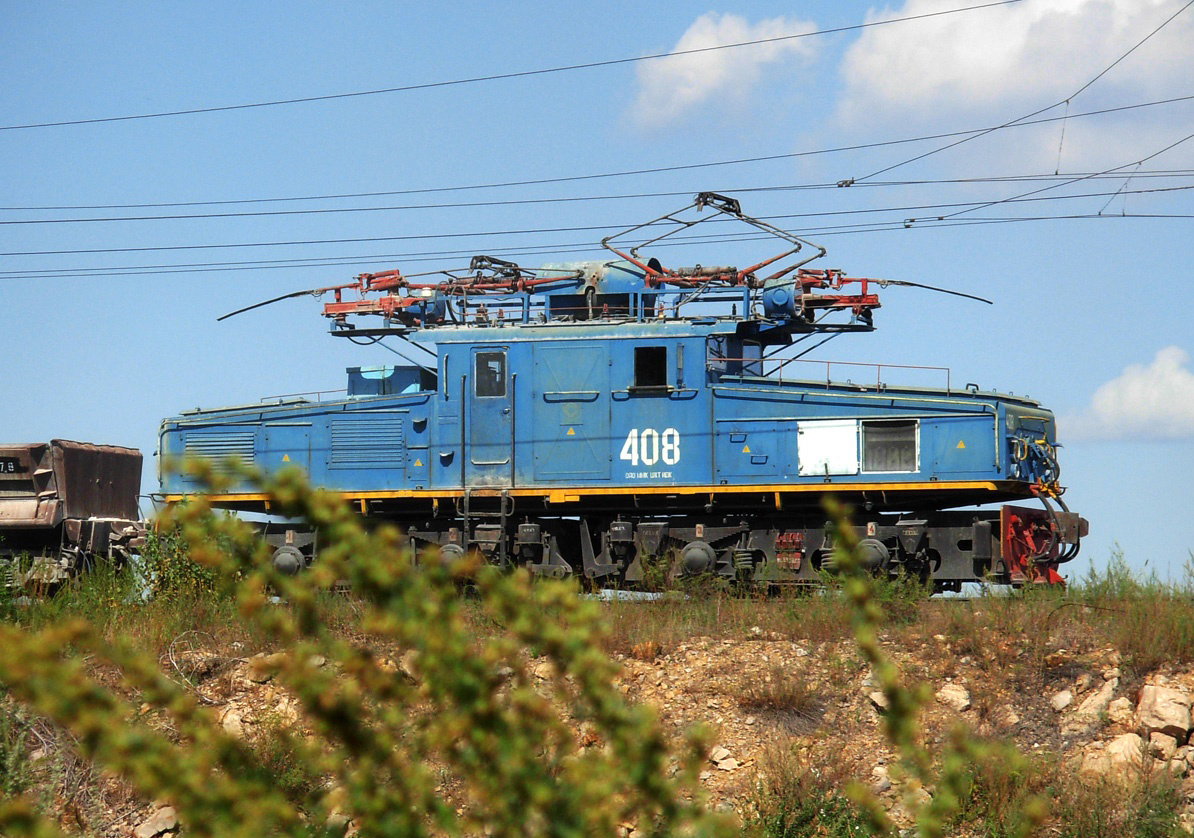
EL2-408 in Magnitogorsk, showing current collectors on the locomotive's roof

The EL2 is powered by four traction motors with a total maximum hourly power of 1,320 kW, delivering 164 kN of tractive effort at 28.5 km/h. Locomotives for the Soviet market used DC at 1.5 kV, while those for other customers operated at 1.2 or 2.4 kV. Motor connections vary by voltage, as shown in the table:

Voltage	Startup	Running
1.2 kV; 1.5 kV	Series-parallel (2×2 motors in series, all in parallel)	4 motors in parallel
2.4 kV	4 motors in series	Series-parallel (2×2 motors in series, all in parallel)

The locomotives feature two current collectors on the machinery compartments. Early EL2 versions for the Soviet Union and the People's Republic of China had current collectors on the cab roof. Depending on the customer, some units included two to four side current collectors for power collection from networks beside the track where overhead catenary above the track center was impractical.

=== Driver's cab ===
The dual-position driver's cab is located at the body's midpoint. Control panels with basic instrumentation – speedometer, brake manometers, ammeters, voltmeters, brake valve, and control stand – are mounted on the front walls. Electrical cabinets are positioned along the sides. Each side wall has an inward-opening door and sliding windows. The front walls feature two windows sealed with rubber gaskets.

=== Upgrades ===
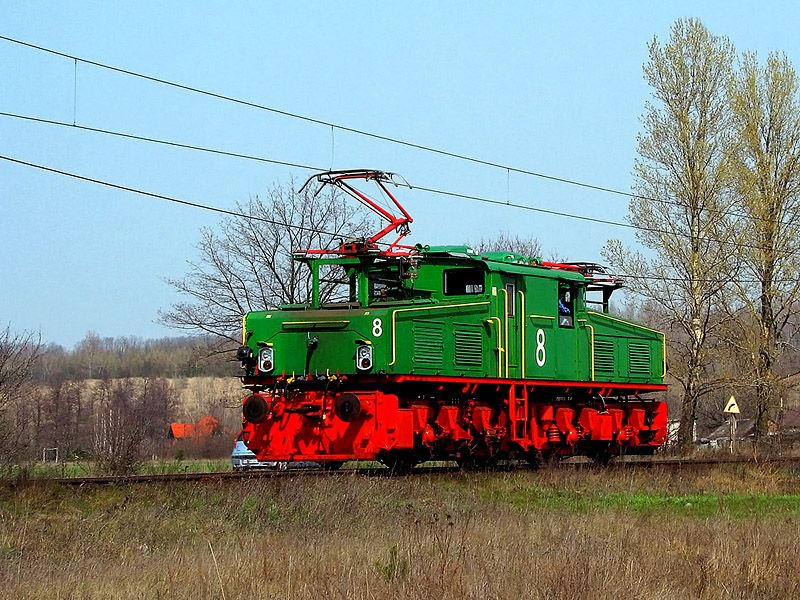
EL2-8 modernized by ZNLE Gliwice for the Adamów Coal Mine

In 1961, the manufacturer introduced multiple-unit train control, enabling one cab to control multiple coupled locomotives, and the Leonard system, allowing remote operation by a digger operator, loader, or a train dispatcher.

Since 1996, EL2 locomotives have been systematically upgraded, especially by coal mines. Brake systems from various manufacturers were standardized to Oerlikon. Some units replaced cast-iron starting resistors with fechral ones, installed new voltage converters, and modernized control panels. A notable innovation is the use of a joystick instead of a traditional control stand for speed regulation: forward tilt increases speed, neutral maintains it via a microprocessor, and backward tilt reduces it.

At KWB Konin, under a law dated 11 February 2000, a unique nationwide CCTV system was introduced to allow pushing trains where reversing or turning the locomotive is impossible. A camera on the last wagon transmits images to a screen in the driver's cab. Switching the reverser to "reverse" automatically activates the camera, lights, and warning bell.

ZNLE Gliwice also modernized several EL2 units for the Adamów Coal Mine, repairing the body and upgrading high- and low-voltage circuits, the cab, control panels, and traction motor equipment.

== Operation ==
Over 36 years, 1,384 EL2 locomotives were produced. Nearly half were used in Germany, with the rest exported to countries including Poland, the Soviet Union, People's Republic of Bulgaria, and the People's Republic of China.

Country	Delivery years	Number operated	Source
East Germany	1952–1988	631	
Soviet Union	1957–1970	245	
Bulgaria	1960–1987	206	
China	1957–1984	186	
Poland	1958–1987	62	

=== Poland ===
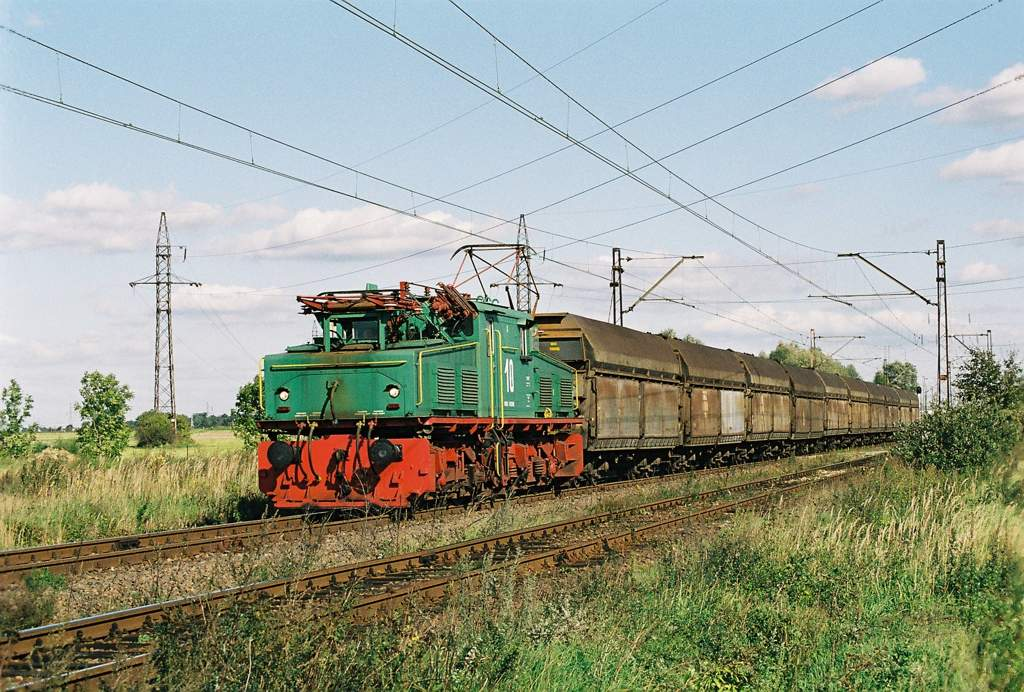
EL2-10 owned by KWB Konin

Deliveries to Poland began in 1958, with the first 16 locomotives supplied to KWB Konin. By 1966, the number reached 53, with the final nine new units arriving between 1970 and 1987. Recipients included KWB Konin, Adamów Coal Mine, KCW Kujawy, and ZGH Zębiec. In the mid-1990s, about 17 used units from Germany were imported.

Since the late 1990s, EL2s have been used only by mines: in 2012, KWB Konin operated 27, and the Adamów Coal Mine had 13.

In December 2017, the Adamów Coal Mine ceased railway operations, and by early 2019, its locomotives were put up for sale.

=== East Germany ===
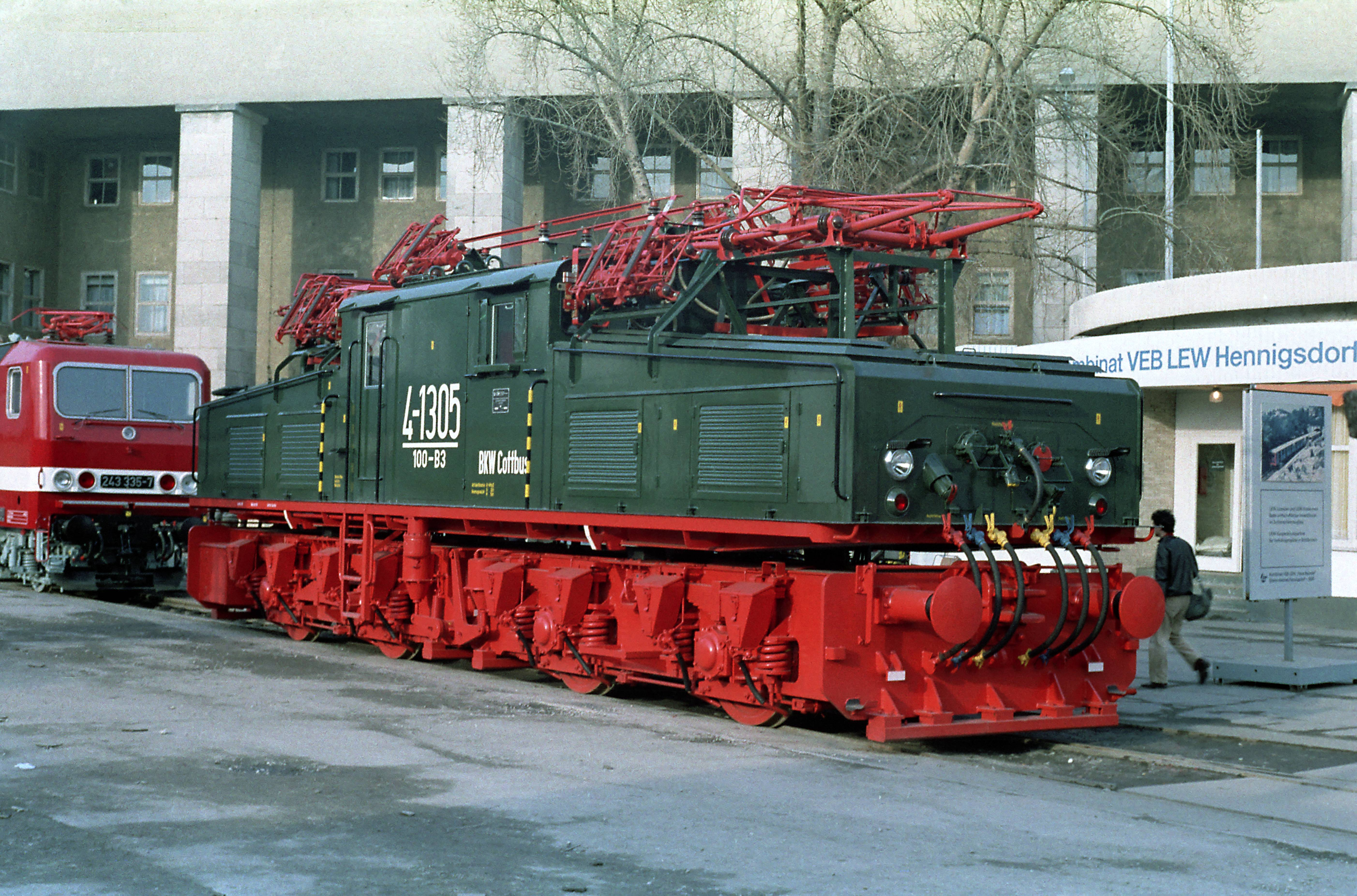
EL2-4-1305 at the Leipzig Trade Fair in 1988

Over 600 new EL2s were delivered to the German market, hauling freight trains for various enterprises, primarily in the East Germany. Since 1952, nicknamed "crocodiles", they have served mining railways extracting lignite in the Lusatian Coalfield. Many units from closed mines were sold to Poland.

=== People's Republic of China ===
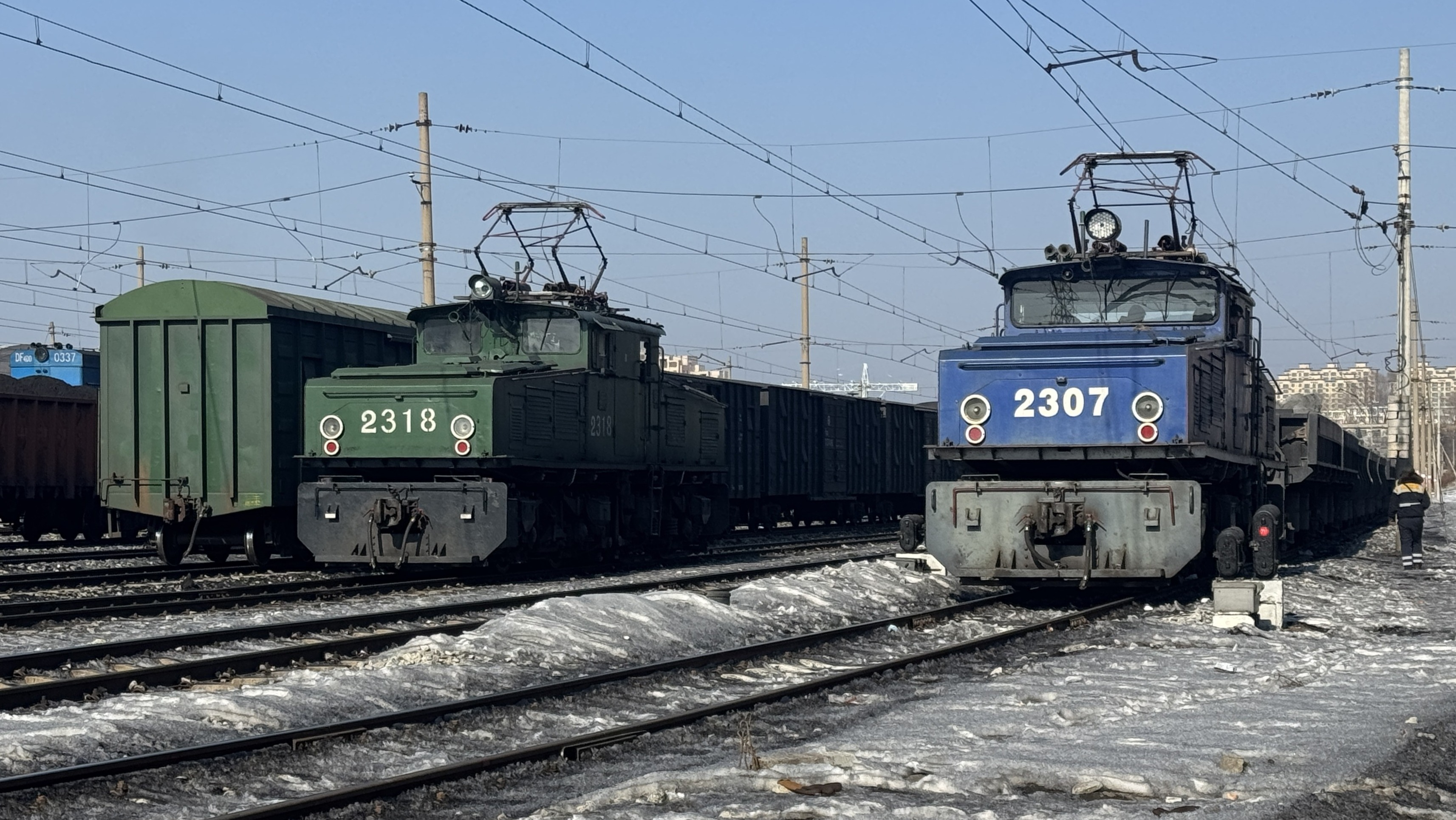
EL2-2318 and EL2-2307 at Hegang

In the People's Republic of China, EL2s are used in the mining industry in Hegang in the northeast and in a coal mine near Chifeng.

=== Soviet Union ===
The Soviet Union acquired 245 locomotives, mostly broad-gauge (1,520 mm). They remain in use in heavy industry in Magnitogorsk, a cement plant in Brocēni, Latvia, and mines of the Vysokogorsky GOK in Nizhny Tagil.

Previously, they operated in the Kuznetsk Basin and an alumina ore mine in Pikalyovo.

=== Bulgaria ===
The largest user of LEW locomotives in Bulgaria is the Maritsa Iztok mining-energy complex in Radnevo, Stara Zagora Province.

== Bibliography ==
- Zintel, Krzysztof (2005). "Lokomotywy elektryczne typu EL2" [Electric Locomotives Type EL2]. Świat Kolei (in Polish). 1. Łódź. ISSN 1234-5962.
