= Newag Dragon =

Polish cargo locomotive

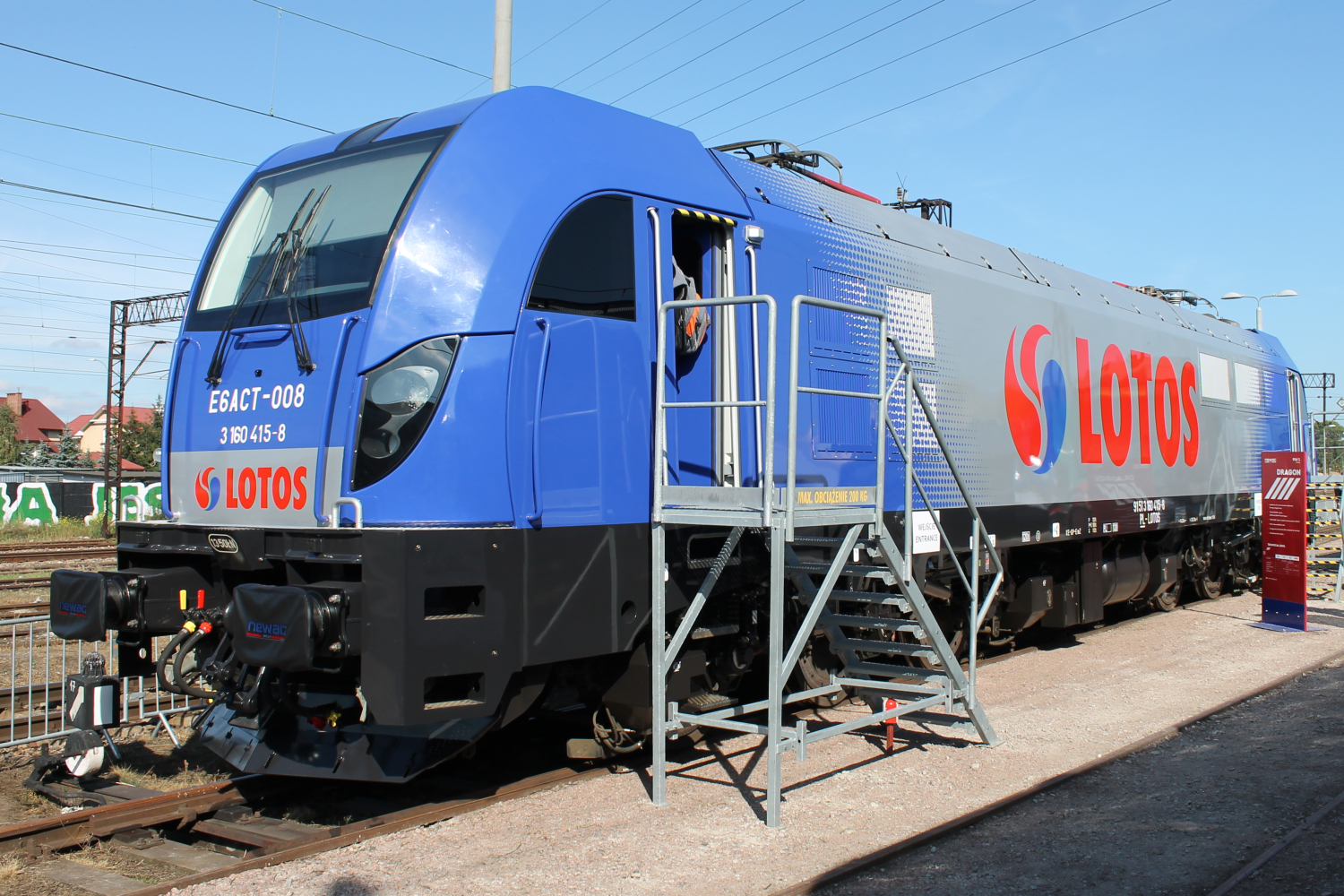
- E6ACT-008
Type and origin
- Power type: Electric; Bi-mode
- Builder: Newag
- Build date: 2009–present
- Total produced: 59
- Website: www.newag.pl/en/offer/griffin-2/
Specifications
- Configuration
  - UIC: Co'Co'
- Gauge: 1,435 mm (4 ft 8 1/2 in) standard gauge
- Wheel diameter: 1,250 mm (49 in)
- Length: 20,330 mm (66.70 ft)
- Width: 3,000 mm (9.8 ft)
- Height: 4,325 mm (14.190 ft)
- Loco weight: 119 t (117 long tons; 131 short tons)
- Electric system/s: DC 3 kV; AC dual mode 15 kV & 25 kV; MS triple mode 3 kV DC, 15 kV & 25 kV AC
Performance figures
- Maximum speed: 120 km/h (75 mph)
- Power output: DC: 5 MW; AC & MS: 7.2 MW
- Tractive effort
  - Starting: 410 kN (92,000 lb_{f}) (450 kN (100,000 lb_{f}) with MAX LOAD option)
Career
- Operators: PKP Cargo, Lotos Kolej, Industrial Division, Freightliner PL, Rail Capital Partners and others
- Class: PKP Cargo: ET25, ET26

The Newag Dragon is a Polish six-axle locomotive, designed for working freight trains up to 5000 tons. The locomotive is built by Newag, between 2009–2016 at its Gliwice plant, since 2017 at the Nowy Sącz plant. By March 2025, 94 units had been built and delivered to 15 different train operating companies in Poland.

== History ==
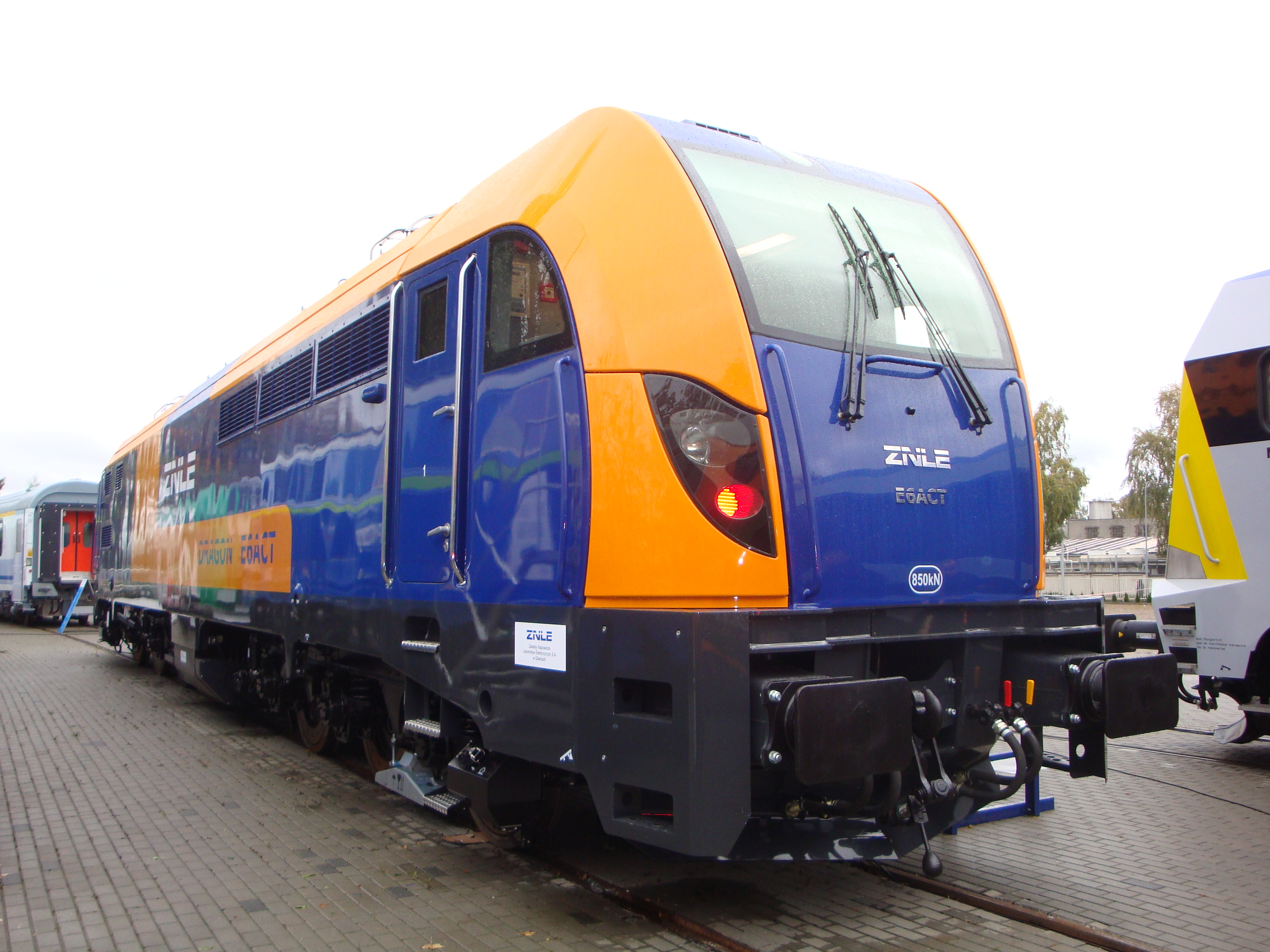
The prototype on railway tracks at the Trako Trade Fair in 2009.

=== Origin ===
Newag Dragon's project was the first Polish electric locomotive project unveiled since the EM10, was unveiled 19 years earlier. Newag was engaged in refurbishing old ET22 locomotives and decided that offering a new locomotive would make more sense, resulting in plans to design and offer a comparable six-axle goods locomotive instead.

=== Prototype production ===
From 2002 no electric locomotives were produced in Poland until September 2006, when an agreement was signed with the Ministry of Science and Higher Education for funding a project to build a new locomotive. It was decided to produce a heavy goods locomotive. The company also decided to produce a six-axle locomotive so that it could operate on a wider variety of tracks. The project for the locomotive was prepared in cooperation with EC Engineering and the Institute of Electrical Engineering. The traction engines were designed by the Research and Development Centre of Electrical Machines Komel and built by the Department of Electrical Machines Emit.

=== Presentations and tests ===
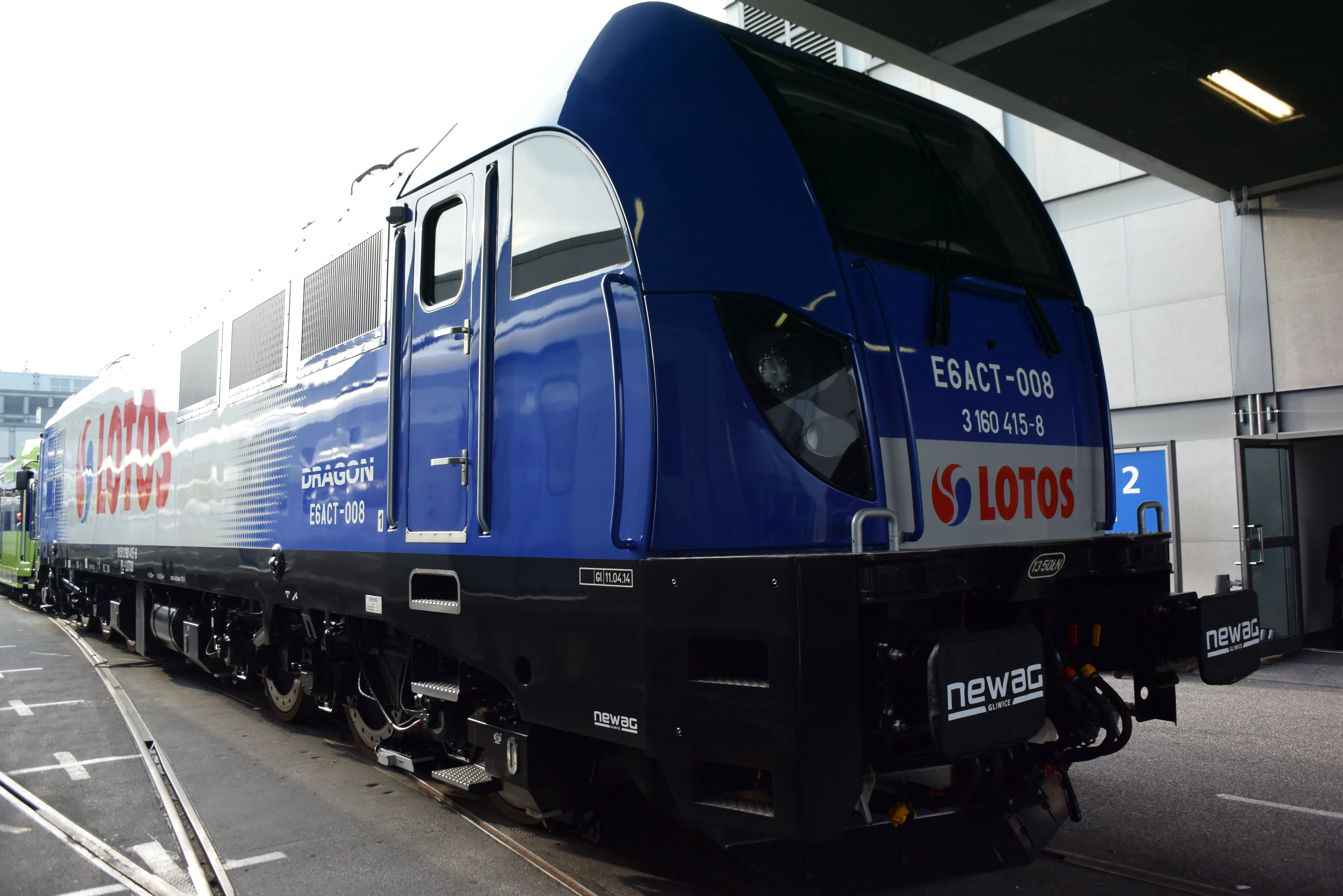
E6ACT-008 produced for Lotos Kolej at the InnoTrans Trade Fair, 2014

From 13 January to 30 December 2011 the supervised operation prototype unit, was led by STK, PKP Cargo, Pol-Miedz Trans and Lotos Kolej, under which E6ACT-001 had been in service for a combined 77 866 km with a maximum train weight of 4 021 t. In October, the locomotive was re-launched at the Trako Trade Fair in Gdańsk. On 23 December the Railway Transport Office issued a perpetual license for the service of the locomotive. In February 2012 promotional operation was taken by DB Schenker Rail Poland. At the InnoTrans Trade Fair in September 2014 the locomotive of the E6ACT-008 series belonging to Lotos Kolej was shown.

In July 2018 the Dragon 2 was introduced by Newag, a slightly revised design that carried the designation E6ACTa. Three units were immediately purchased by PKP Cargo and delivered in October 2018. They bear PKP-style designations ET25-001 through -003.

== Deliveries ==
| State | Operator | Type | Side numbers | Count |
|---|---|---|---|---|
| Poland | Cargounit | E6ACT | 001 ÷ 004 | 4 |
| Poland | Cargounit | E6ACTa | 004 ÷ 006, 016 | 4 |
| Poland | Cargounit | E6ACTd | | 0/10 |
| Poland | Orlen Kolej | E6ACT | 005 ÷ 009 | 5 |
| Poland | Orlen Kolej | E6ACTa | 009, 011 ÷ 012 | 3 |
| Poland | Orlen Kolej | E6ACTab | 010, 025, 028, 032, 034, 040 | 6 |
| Poland | Freightliner PL | E6ACTd | 101 ÷ 105 | 5 |
| Poland | Railpolonia | E6ACTd | 106 | 1 |
| Poland | Railpolonia | E6ACTadb | 029 | 1 |
| Poland | PKP Cargo | E6ACTa/ET25 | 001 ÷ 003 | 3 |
| Poland | PKP Cargo | E6ACTad/ET26 | 001 ÷ 007 | 7 |
| Poland | PKP Cargo | E6MST/ET43 | 001 ÷ 024 | 24 |
| Poland | Newag | E6ACT | 001 | 1 |
| Poland | Newag | E6ACTadb | 030 | 1 |
| Poland | Newag | E6ACTa | 007 ÷ 008, 013 ÷ 014 | 4 |
| Poland | Jaxan | E6ACTa | 015 | 1 |
| Poland | ZPK Szumowo | E6ACTad | 017, 026 | 2 |
| Poland | Cemet | E6ACTadb | 027, 044 | 2 |
| Poland | Laude Smart Intermodal | E6ACTab | 031, 033 | 2 |
| Poland | Laude Smart Intermodal | E6ACTadb | 035 ÷ 036 | 2 |
| Poland | Rail Capital Partners | E6ACTab | 037 ÷ 039, 041 ÷ 042 | 5 |
| Poland | Rail Capital Partners | E6ACTadb | | 0/3 |
| Poland | Rail Capital Partners | E6MST | | 0/2 |
| Poland | Rail STM | E6ACTadb | 043 | 1 |
| Poland | Dolata | E6ACTadb | 045 | 1 |
| Poland | Grupa Azoty Koltar | E6ACTab | 051 | 1 |
| Poland | Olavion | E6ACTab | 056 ÷ 058 | 3/4 |
| Poland | Akiem | E6ACTadb | | 0/20 |
| Poland | Akiem | E6MST | | 0/10 |
| Poland | MEDEX | E6ACTab | 052 | 1 |

d – subtype designates a dual-power option (auxiliary 540 kilowatt diesel engine primarily for shunting)
a – subtype designates a revised design marketed as "Dragon 2"

== Construction ==
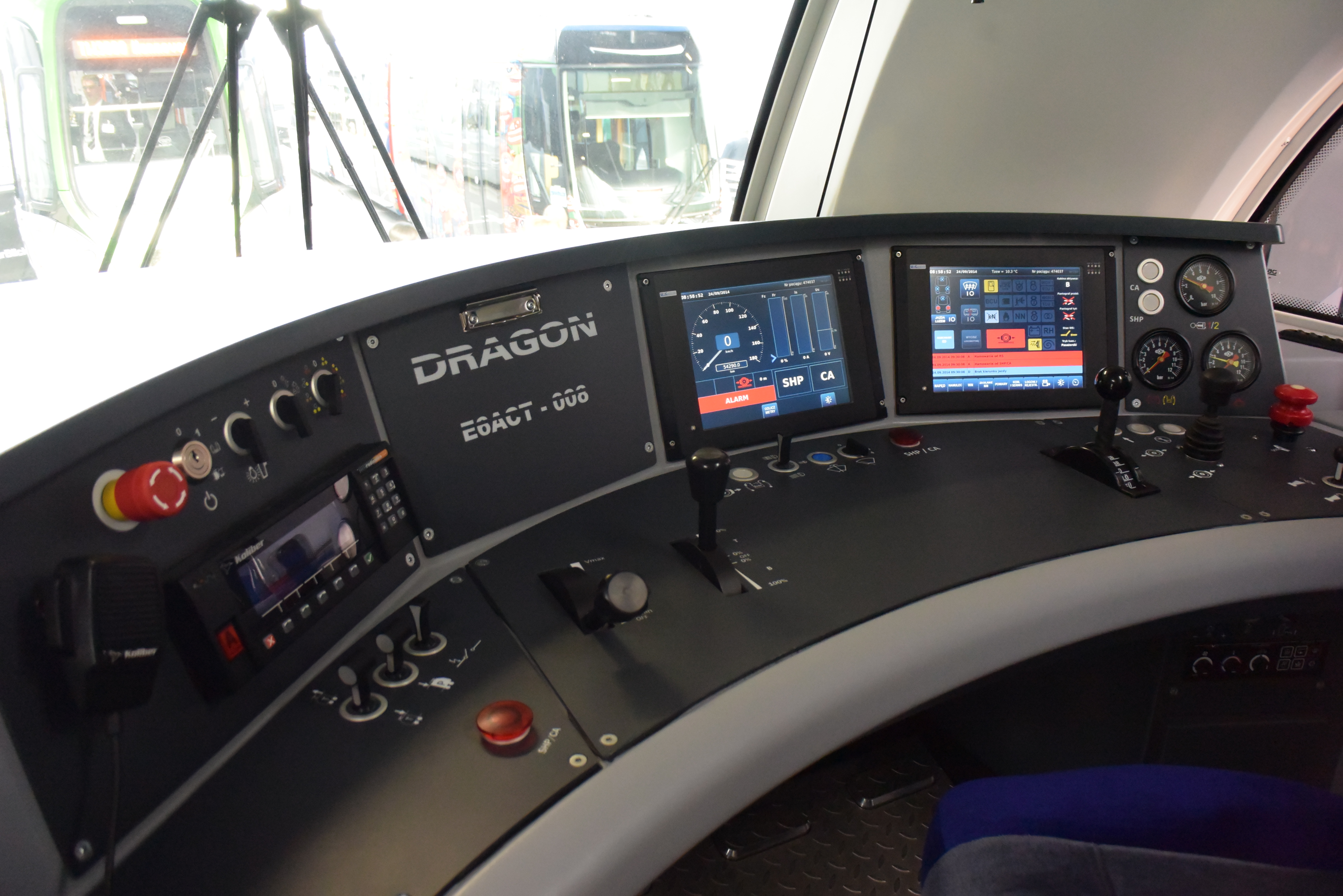
Driver's cab.

=== Available versions ===
The locomotives are available in the following versions:

- 3 kV DC (type E6ACT, previously E6DCU).
- 15 kV 16.7 Hz and/or 25 kV 50 Hz (type E6ACU).
- 3 kV DC, and 15 and/or 25 kV AC (type E6MSU).
- Diesel (version with lower power and lower maximum speed at full load).

The manufacturer also provides 2 options:

- Max load – increasing the tractive effort to 450 kN.
- Dual power – an auxiliary diesel engine.

=== E6ACT ===
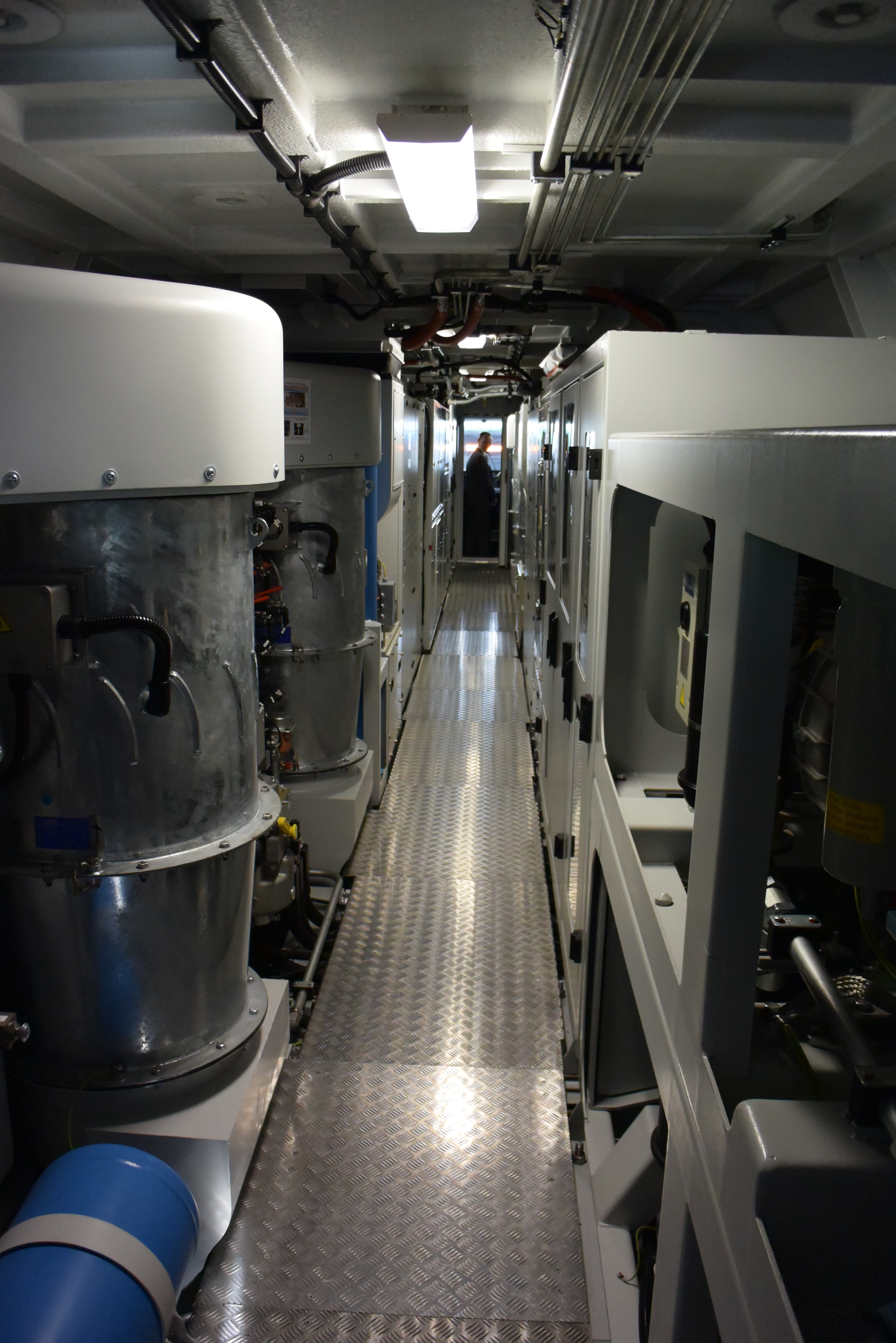
The engine compartment. To the left are motor fan ducts, to the right is pneumatic gear rack.

==== Power supply ====
The E6ACT locomotive is designed to operate at a supply voltage of 3 kV DC. The locomotive's power electronics is based on IGBT technology. The first unit is powered by 6 STX500-4A electric motors, developing 834 kW each, powered by traction converters developed by the Institute of Electrical Engineering. The gear axle SET 553 is supplied by Voith. The locomotives are equipped with disc brakes. There are also multisystem models on offer.

==== Capabilities ====
The E6ACT/E6ACU locomotive has a continuous power output of 5,004 MW and a starting tractive effort of 375 kN, enabling it to pull 4,000 tonnes of cargo – or 4,500 with Max Load option.
