= Culture and Recreation Park in Gliwice =

Communal forest in Gliwice, Poland

Coordinates: 50°18′27″N 18°42′40″E

Culture and Recreation Park
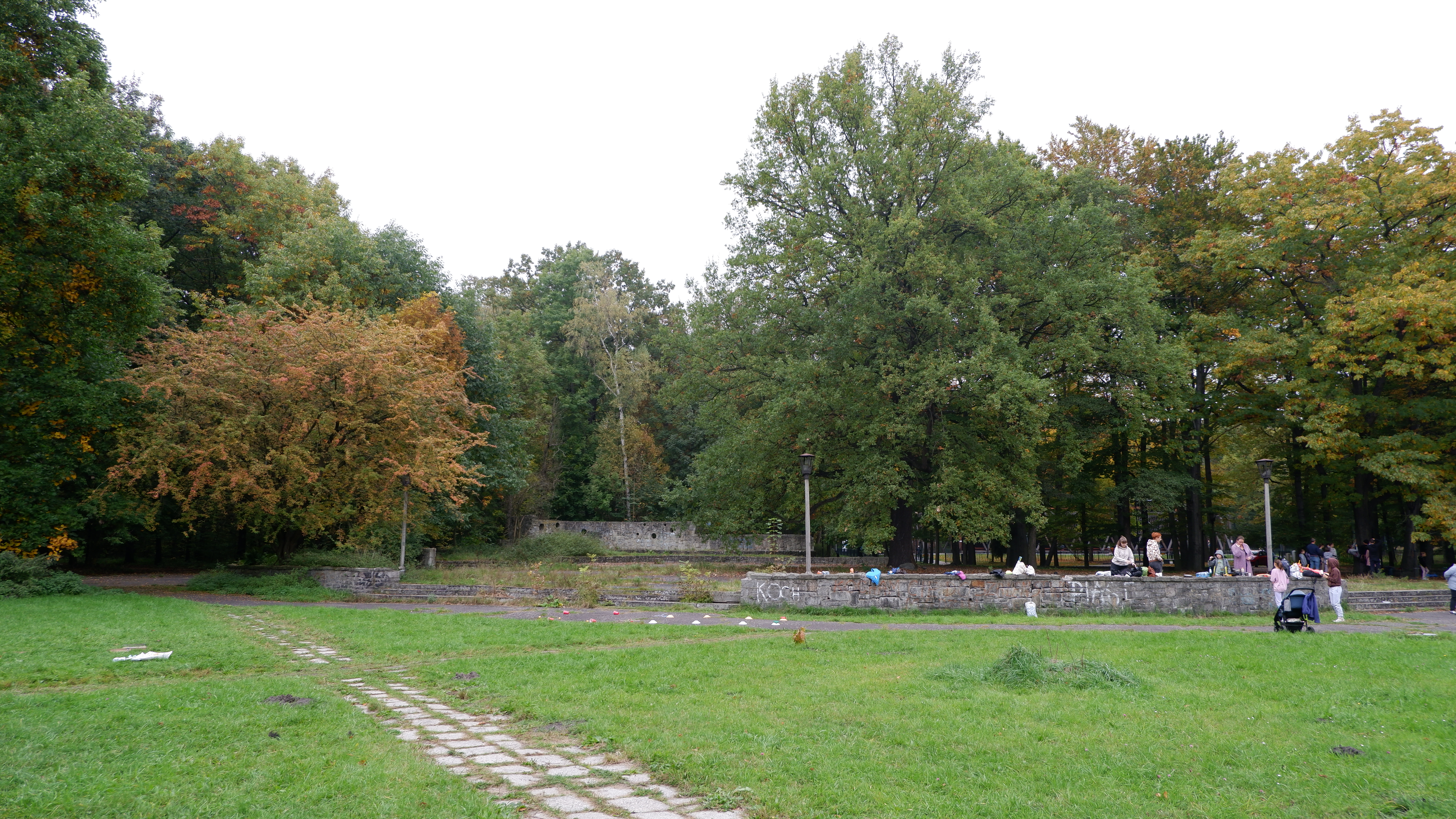
- Interactive map of Culture and Recreation Park
- Location: Gliwice
- Area: 197,6026 ha
- Operator: MZUK

Culture and Recreation Park (Polish: Park Kultury i Wypoczynku or Las Żorek, German: Stadtwald) is a communal forest in Gliwice. Inside the park is a castle forest (Polish: Zameczek Leśny).

== Objects ==
- steel tube stations.
- castle forest
- playground
