= Orlen KolTrans =

Polish rail company (2001 - 2023)

Orlen KolTrans Sp. z o.o.

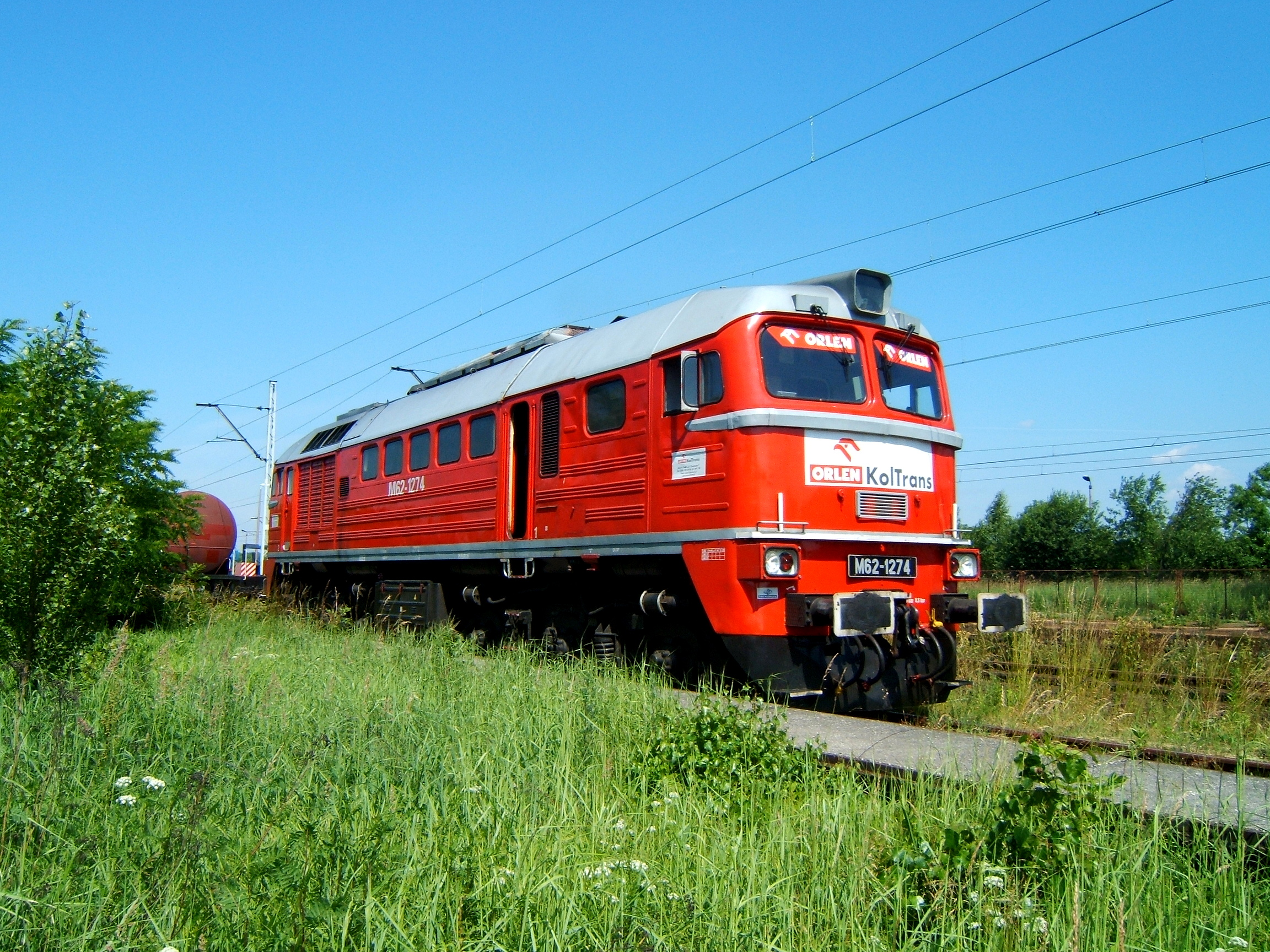
- M62 locomotive
- Type: Ltd.
- Industry: Rail transport
- Founded: 2001
- Defunct: 2023
- Headquarters: Płock, Poland
- Key people: Marcin Kaminski
- Website: www.koltrans.pl

Orlen KolTrans was a Polish rail company operating as a part of PKN Orlen. Orlen KolTrans was responsible for transporting PKN Orlen products and delivering crude oil to refineries.

In October 2024, Orlen KolTrans was formally consolidated with Lotos Kolej and the latter was renamed Orlen Kolej.

== See also ==
- Transportation in Poland
- List of railway companies
- Polish locomotives designation
