= PKP class EM10 =

PKP EM10
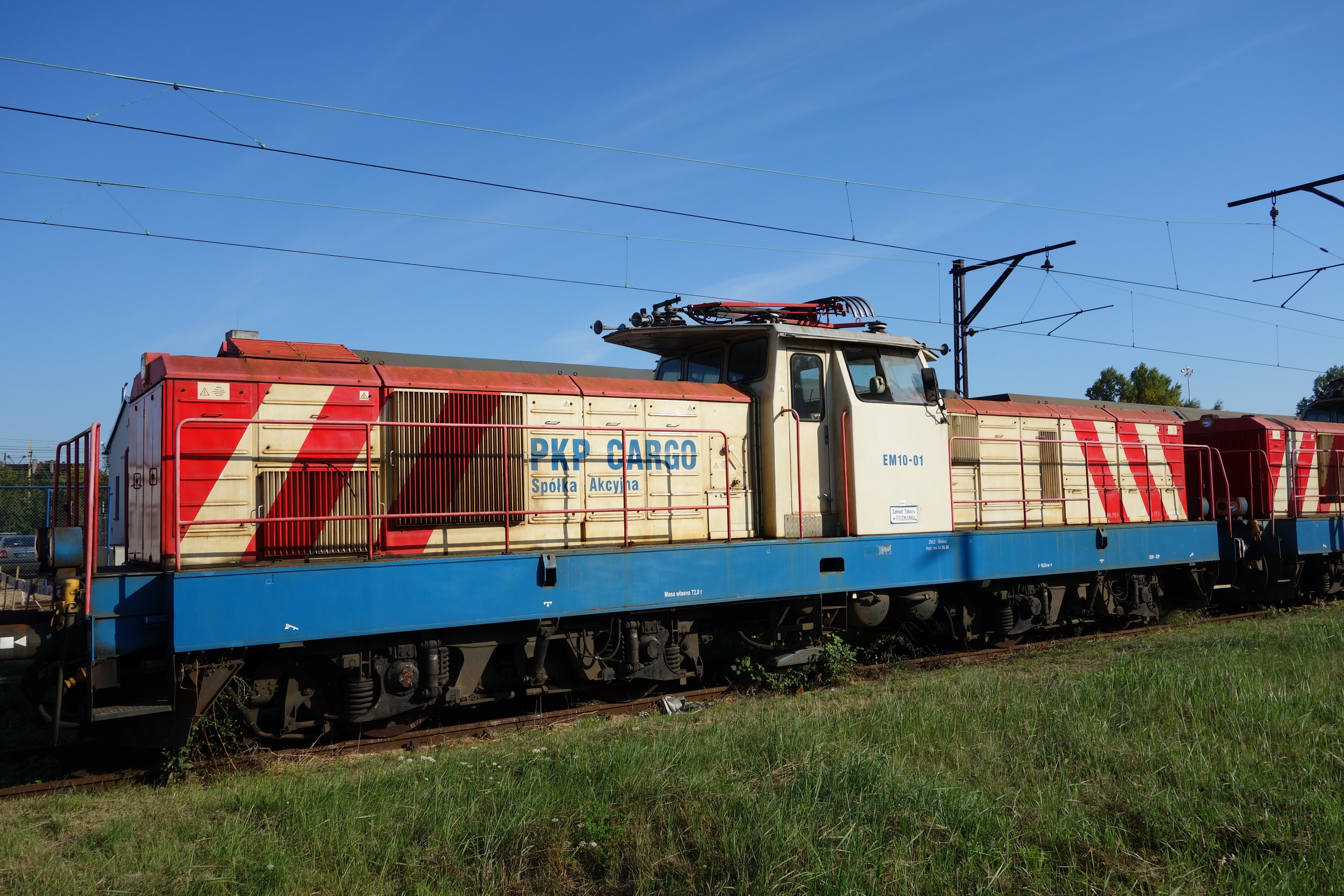
- EM10 locomotive
Type and origin
- Power type: Electric
- Builder: H. Cegielski – Poznań
- Build date: 1990-1991
- Total produced: 4
Specifications
- Configuration
  - UIC: Bo'Bo'
- Gauge: 1,435 mm (4 ft 8 1/2 in) standard gauge
- Wheel diameter: 1,100 mm (43.31 in)
- Length: 16,340 mm (53 ft 7 in)
- Loco weight: 72 tonnes (71 long tons; 79 short tons)
- Electric system/s: 3000 V DC Catenary
- Current pickup: Pantograph
- Traction motors: LKa 493, 71:16 gear ratio
- Loco brake: Oerlikon ED
- Train brakes: Air
Performance figures
- Maximum speed: 80 km/h (50 mph)
- Power output: 960 kW (1,290 hp)
Career
- Operators: PKP
- Locale: Poland
- Last run: 2009
- Preserved: 1
- Scrapped: 2021
- Current owner: PKP Cargo

PKP class EM10 is a class of Polish electric locomotives used by the Polish railway operator Polskie Koleje Państwowe (PKP). They were built for shunting purposes.

== History ==
Designed in 1988, the EM10 was intended to function as a shunting locomotive and short distance passenger locomotive. Only four prototypes were built, they were operated by PKP. In 2004, they were modernised by ZNLE Gliwice.

The locomotives last ran in 2009, since then they were stored at the Poznań Franowo depot. In 2021 three were scrapped, one will be offered to a museum or a rolling stock collection.

== Locomotive assignment ==
Locomotives numbers	Operator	Remarks
01, 02, 03, 04	PKP Cargo	ex EM10-001, 002, 101, 102

== See also ==
- PKP classification system
