= Adamów Coal Mine =

Mine in Poland

Adamów coal mine
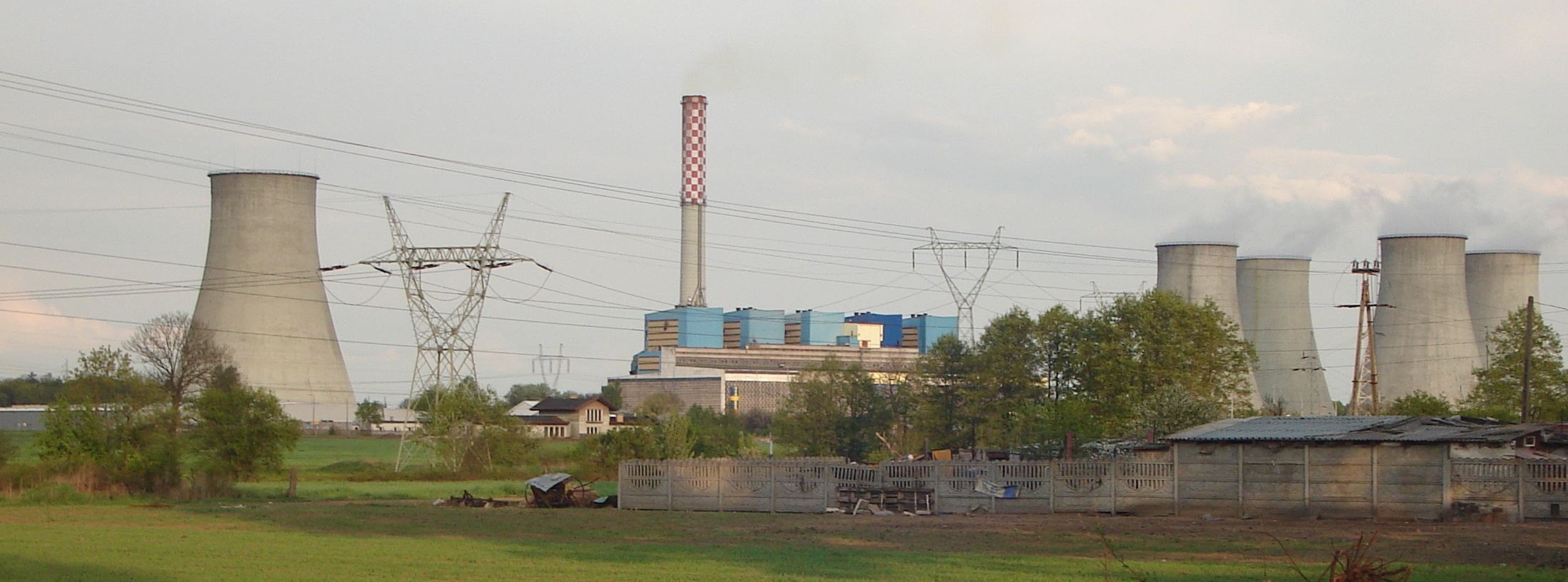
- Adamów power plant

- Location within Poland

Location
- Location: Turek, Greater Poland Voivodeship, Poland; 52.0191°N 18.6331°E

Production
- Products: lignite
- Production: 1,600,000

History
- Opened: 1979
- Closed: 2021

Owner
- Company: Kopalnia Węgla Brunatnego Adamów
- Company
- Type: Public company

The Adamów brown coal mine (Polish: Kopalnia Węgla Brunatnego „Adamów”) was a large open-pit mine in Turek, Greater Poland Voivodeship, central Poland, 208 km west of the capital, Warsaw. At the time of its commissioning Adamów held one of the largest lignite reserves in Poland, estimated to be 90 million tonnes of coal. The annual coal production was around 1.6 million tonnes.

In August 2020 the management announced that the mine will be closed by the end of the year. Because there was still some coal left, the management decided to continue operations and the last excavator was permanently turned off at 4:50 pm on 17 February 2021. There are plans to install a photovoltaic array on the site.
