= Orlen Rail =

Polish railway company

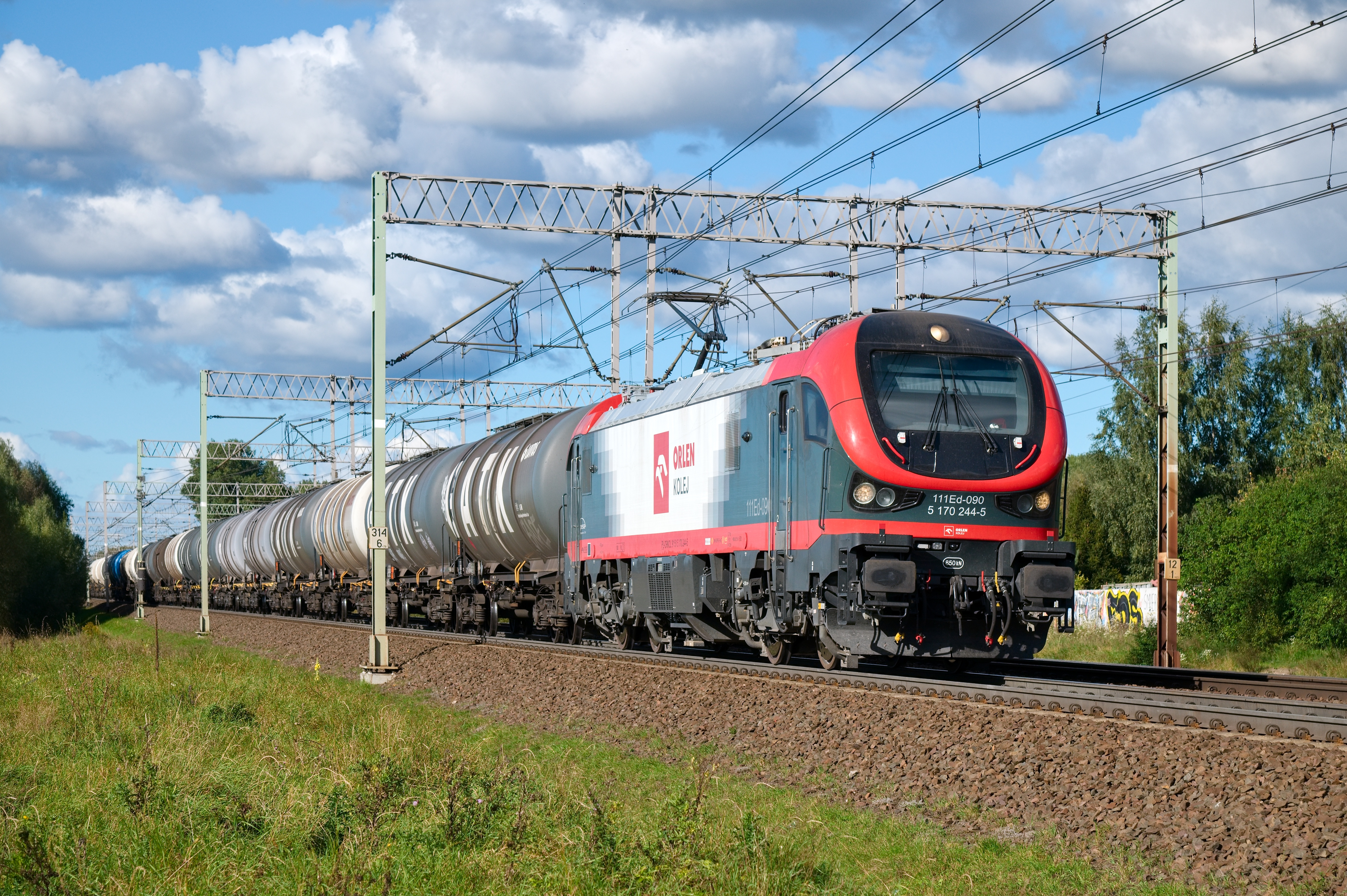
- A freight train of Orlen Rail
- Native name: Orlen Kolej
- Type: Ltd.
- Industry: Rail transport
- Founded: 20 April 2002 (component of Gdańsk Refinery); 1 January 2003 (separate organization)
- Headquarters: Gdańsk, Poland
- Key people: Krzysztof Duszczyk CEO
- Number of employees: 1,700 (2024)
- Website: kolej.orlen.pl

Orlen Rail (Polish: Orlen Kolej), formerly known as Lotos Kolej, is a rail transport company owned by Orlen since 2022, previously having been owned by Grupa Lotos and the Gdańsk Refinery. It was founded in 2002 and is headquartered in the city of Gdańsk.

== History ==
=== Background ===
In 1997, Euronaft Trzebinia, the first private industrial railway company in Poland founded after 1989, was created to ship oil coming from a refinery in Trzebinia. In 2001, the Polish State Railways (Polish: Polskie Linie Kolejowe; PKP) were restructured from a single company to several different railway companies all comprising the PKP Group. One of such companies was PKP Polskie Linie Kolejowe, which managed the rail infrastructure and had to make a profit, thus opening the door for rapid growth in the private rail sector.

=== History of Orlen Rail and its predecessors ===
Orlen Rail received its license to operate on 20 March 2002, as an arm of the Gdańsk Refinery. On 1 January 2003, the Rail Transport Administration of the Gdańsk Refinery was opened as a separate company, administering the rolling stock of the refinery and its operations. On 8 October, the Administration received permission from PKP PLK to operate on all of its tracks, soon being renamed to Lotos Kolej.

On 1 February 2004, Grupa Lotos bought refineries in Czechowice-Dziedzice, Jasło, and Gorlice, which were, from then on, serviced by Lotos Kolej, which conducted its first international transport on 20 April 2007. Despite this, its international services that went to Germany only went as far as Szczecin Gumieńce railway station before relaying their freight to other rail companies. On 1 September 2022, Orlen formally bought Lotos Group, and as a result, Orlen's own railway company, Orlen KolTrans was absorbed into Lotos Kolej on 3 July 2023. On 14 October 2024, its name was changed to Orlen Rail.

== Rolling stock ==
Immediately after it was created, LotosKolej possessed seven SM42 locomotives. At the start of 2005, it bought four M62s and two ST43s. In June 2005, it exchanged all of its M62 locomotives with PCC Rail Szczakowa, a subsidiary of DB Cargo Polska, in exchange for 5 ST43s for future long-range transport use. Older electric locomotives were also soon acquired, with the basic type of such locomotive in use being Škoda 31E locomotives leased to Orlen Koley by České dráhy.

In November 2009, Lotos Kolej was leased its first Alstom Traxx locomotive, and after that, 8 more such locomotives appeared in its fleet, although none were actually owned by the company. The new locomotives allowed for the old ST43s to be retired, completely withdrawn by January 2011. More Traxxes were leased out or bought through the following years. In 2011, the company began operating a Newag Dragon locomotive. In 2014, four more Dragons were leased out to it. It only operates one type of carriage, the 417F tank car.

Type	Image
ST43	
201Eo	
SM42	
ET40	
6Dg-153	
181	
TRAXX DE	
111Ed	
Newag Dragon	
M62	
TRAXX	

== See also ==
- Transportation in Poland
- List of railway companies
- Polish locomotives designation
