= HCP Z1 =

Polish-made train carriages

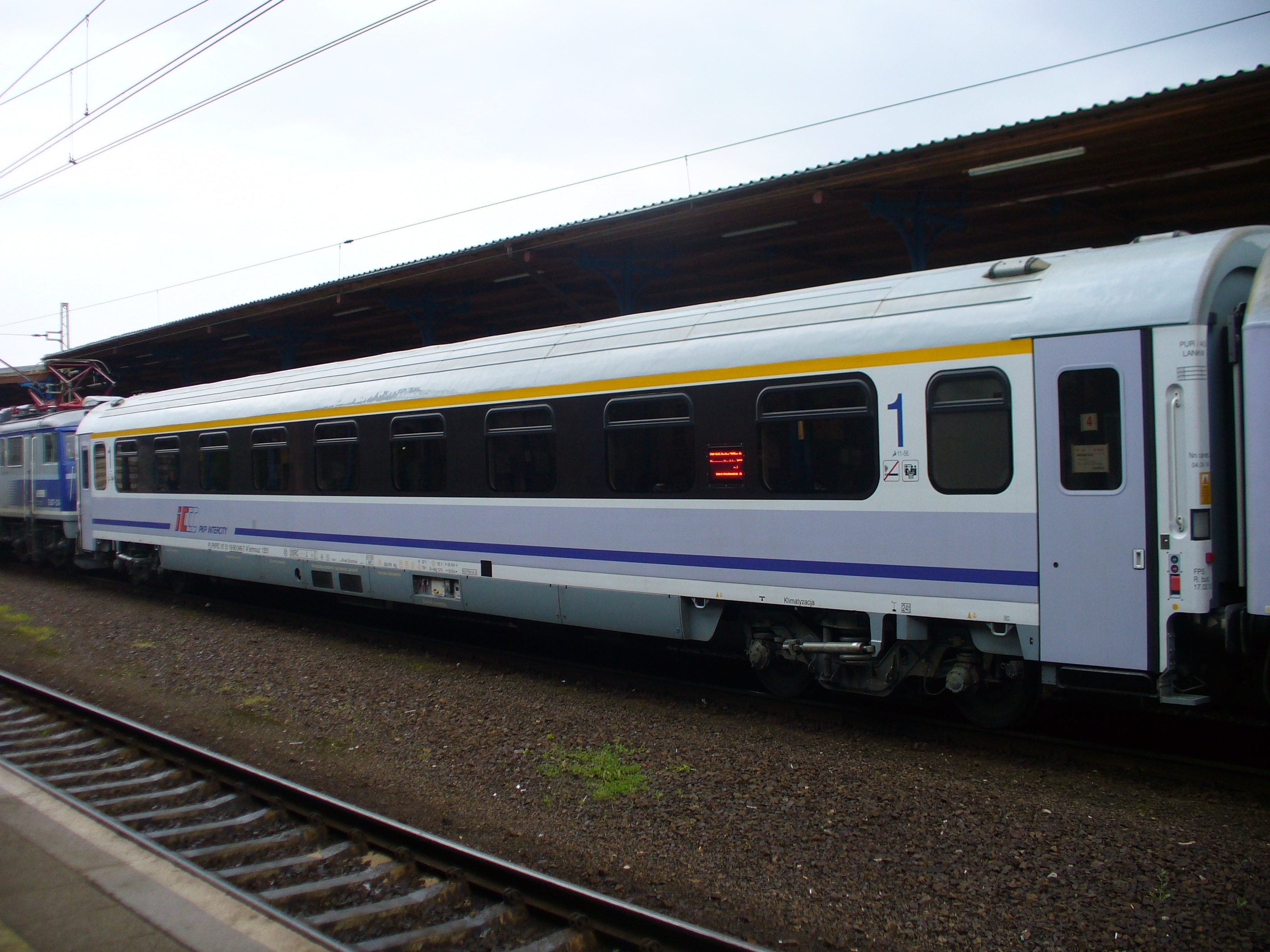
- 156A – passenger carriage with a business section.

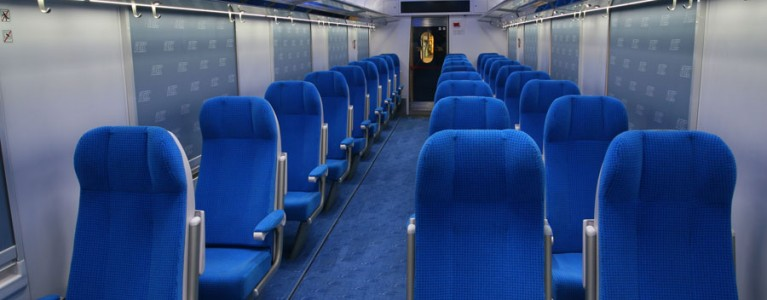
- The open layout saloon car.
- Manufacturer: Adtranz/ABB, H. Cegielski
- Family name: UIC-Z1
- Constructed: 1997–2015
- Capacity: 54

Specifications
- Car length: 26.400 m (86 ft 7.4 in)
- Width: 2,824 mm (111.2 in)
- Height: 4,050 mm (13 ft 3 in)
- Entry: Step
- Maximum speed: 200 km/h (124 mph)

HCP Z1 is a series of train carriages constructed by H. Cegielski in Poznań, which meet the UIC-Z1 standard for passenger train carriages. Several types of the wagons in the standard have been built, 138 units overall as of 2015. The main user of the carriages is PKP Intercity. The HCP Z1 is also used by the Belarusian Railway and the Polski Tabor Szynowy.

== History ==
=== The first UIC-Z passenger carriages built in Poland ===
The first UIC-Z carriage in Poland was designed in 1974 (122A). However, the electrical equipment and air conditioning that were to be used on type 122A carriages were not manufactured in then-communist Polish People's Republic or in any other Eastern Bloc country, while importing such equipment from capitalist countries was deemed prohibitively expensive. At the end of the 1970s, the first plans have been drawn up for passenger carriages with increased comfort (127A and 127Aa) which took the form of the non-air-conditioned UIC-Z2. The first two units of the carriage were by PaFaWag in 1980. The structure and use of the carriages have been drawn up by the H. Cegielski company to build the upcoming Z2. With the use of the plans of the 127A in Poznań warehouses to house the manufacture have been built where the 134Aa/b have been built.

=== Importing the Z1 ===
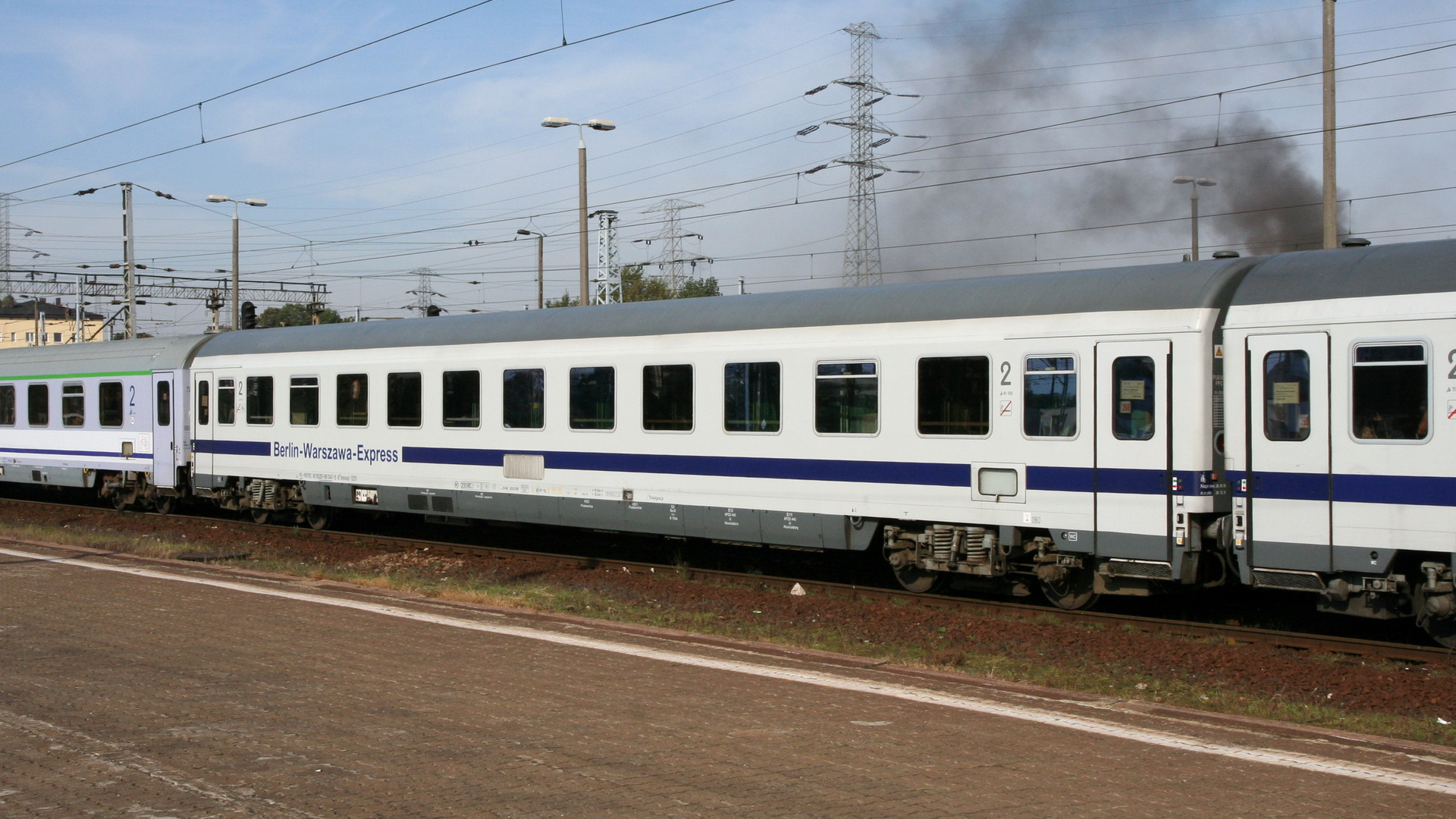
ABB Z1B carriage used by PKP Intercity on the EuroCity Berlin-Warszawa-Express.

The first Z1 carriages in Poland were built by Adtranz/ABB. In the third quarter of 1996 the first 15 carriages of the ABB Z1A standard class have been delivered to PKP, later (after the first quarter of 1997) 35 carriages of the ABB Z1B have been delivered to Poland. All of which were German production. These were the first carriages which PKP had used which went up to 200 km/h (124 mph).

=== H. Cegielski builds the Polish Z1 ===
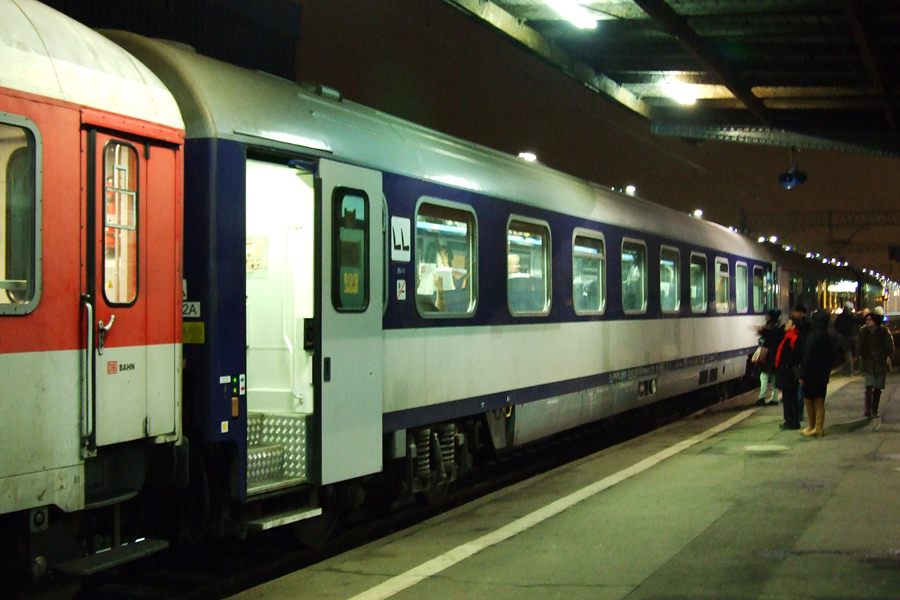
HCP 152A carriage used on the EuroNight Jan Kiepura train.

At the same time three projects have been created for passenger carriages which were able to travel at the speed of 200 km/h (124 mph) - these were the 150A, 152A and 154A . The first 150A were built by the Pafawag company in Wrocław, which were built for the Polish 11ANa, which were presented in 1996 at the MTP. The carriages were converted into the 150C type and were designed to test the carriages - 11ANa first, then the 11ANc.

The first serial producer of the UIC-Z1 in Poland became H. Cegielski. In the beginning it was believed the Polish company would register the carriages under the ABB Henschel company, but they decided to build the carriages with their own structure of the 145A and 145Ab. On the 31 December 1997 the company had completed their first 6 units of the 152A type and not long after the open saloon second class carriages 154A have been built. In 2000 two business class carriages of the 145Ac have been built and the first sleep carriage of the Z1 of the 305Ab.

=== Awards and presentations at trade fairs ===
At the Poznań International Fair the passenger carriages of the 152A (1998) and 305Ad (2004) have both won golden medals. The 154A won the Second Grand Prix at the International Railway Fair Kolej '98 in Bydgoszcz.

== Versions ==
Type	Production	Carriages	Weight	Sort	Number of compartments				Numbers of Seats				Others
Type	Production	Carriages	Weight	Sort	2 kl.	1 kl.	business		2 Class.	1 Class.	business		Others
145Ac	2000	25ANa1	52t	open saloon	–	–	9	–	–	–	36	–	
152A	1997-1998	MD 524	55 t	open saloon	–	2	–	–	–	54	–	–	
152Aa	2000, 2003	25ANa	55 t	open saloon	–	1	–	–	–	54	–	–	
154A	1998-1999	SGP 300-RS/3S	50-52 t	open saloon	1	–	–	–	80	–	–	1	
154Aa	1999-2002	25ANa	50-52 t	open saloon	1	–	–	–	80	–	–	1	
156A	2011-	25ANa	50 t	compartment	–	6	3	–	–	36	12	–	
157Aa		25ANa	52 t	compartment	8	–	–	1	50	–	–	2	
158A	from 2009	25ANa	50 t	open saloon	–	1	–	–	–	54	–	–	
159A	from 2010	25ANa	50 t	open saloon	1	–	–	–	72	–	–	–	
164A				open saloon	–	1	–	–	–	54	–	–	
165A				open saloon	1	–	–	–	72	–	–	–	
156A (first 166A)	2013	25ANa	52 t	compartment	–	9	–	–	–	54	–	–	
156A (first. 167A)	2014	25ANa	52 t	compartment	9	–	–	1	56	–	–	2	

== Users ==
=== Belarusian Railway ===
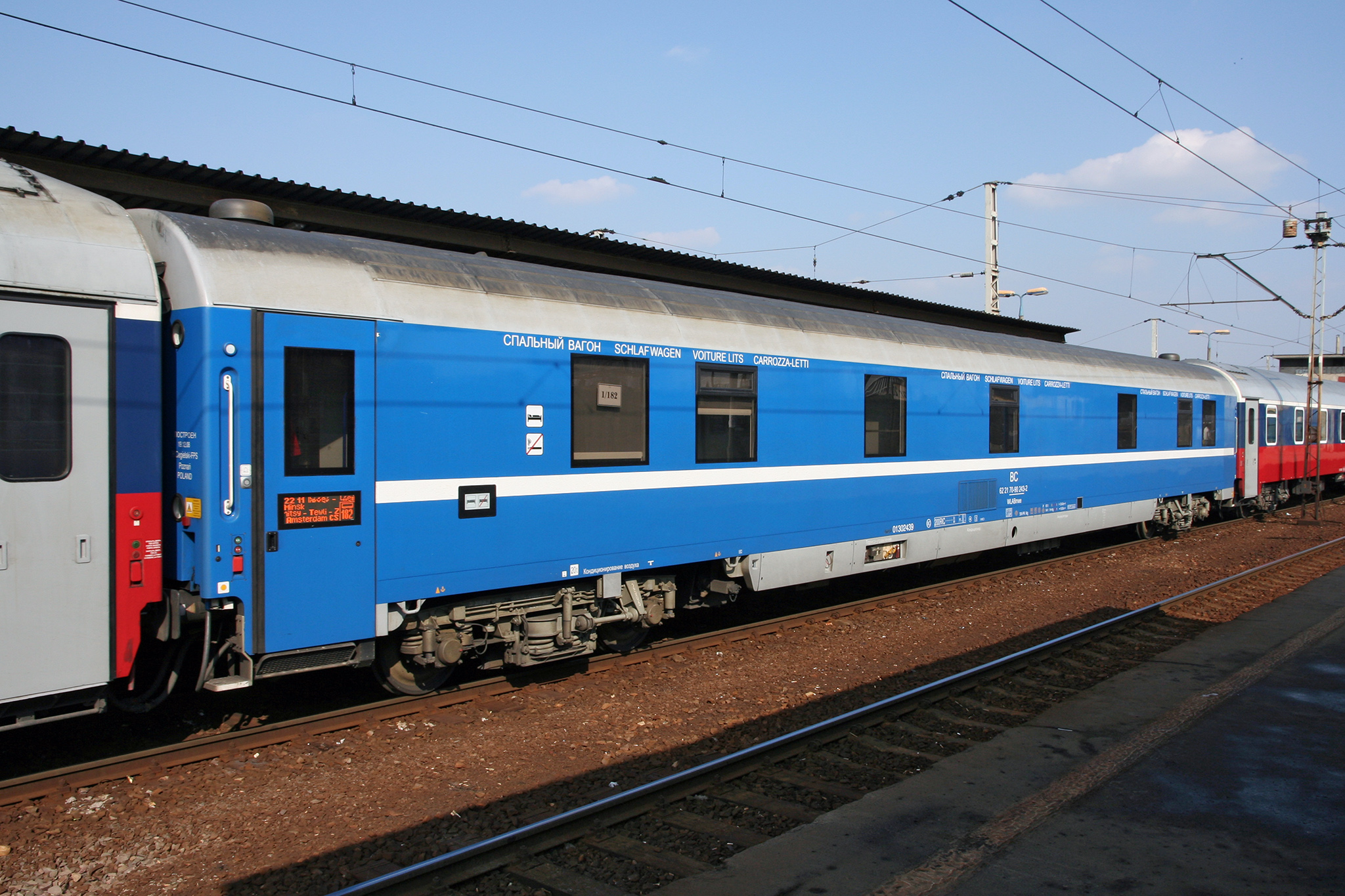
Belarusian Railway 305Ad2 passenger carriage

In 2008 H. Cegielski delivered the first two units of the 305Ad2 sleeper carriages to the Belarusian Railway. 10 June 2010 another order for two similar types was signed for the transportation company. The Belarusian 305Ad2 which are based in Minsk regularly travel through Poland to reach Basel and Amsterdam.

=== PKP Intercity ===
==== New Generation ====
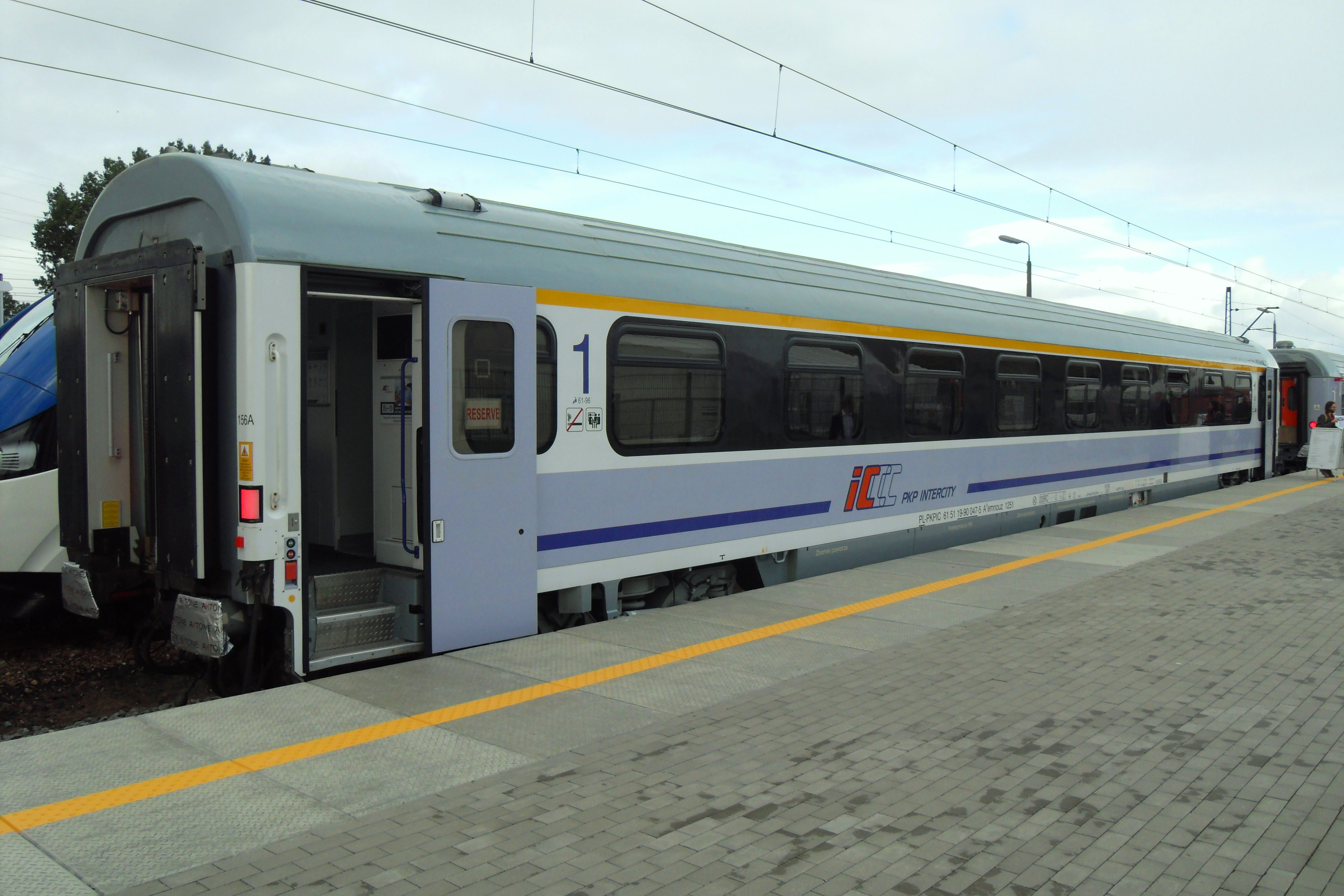
156A passenger carriage with business compartments.

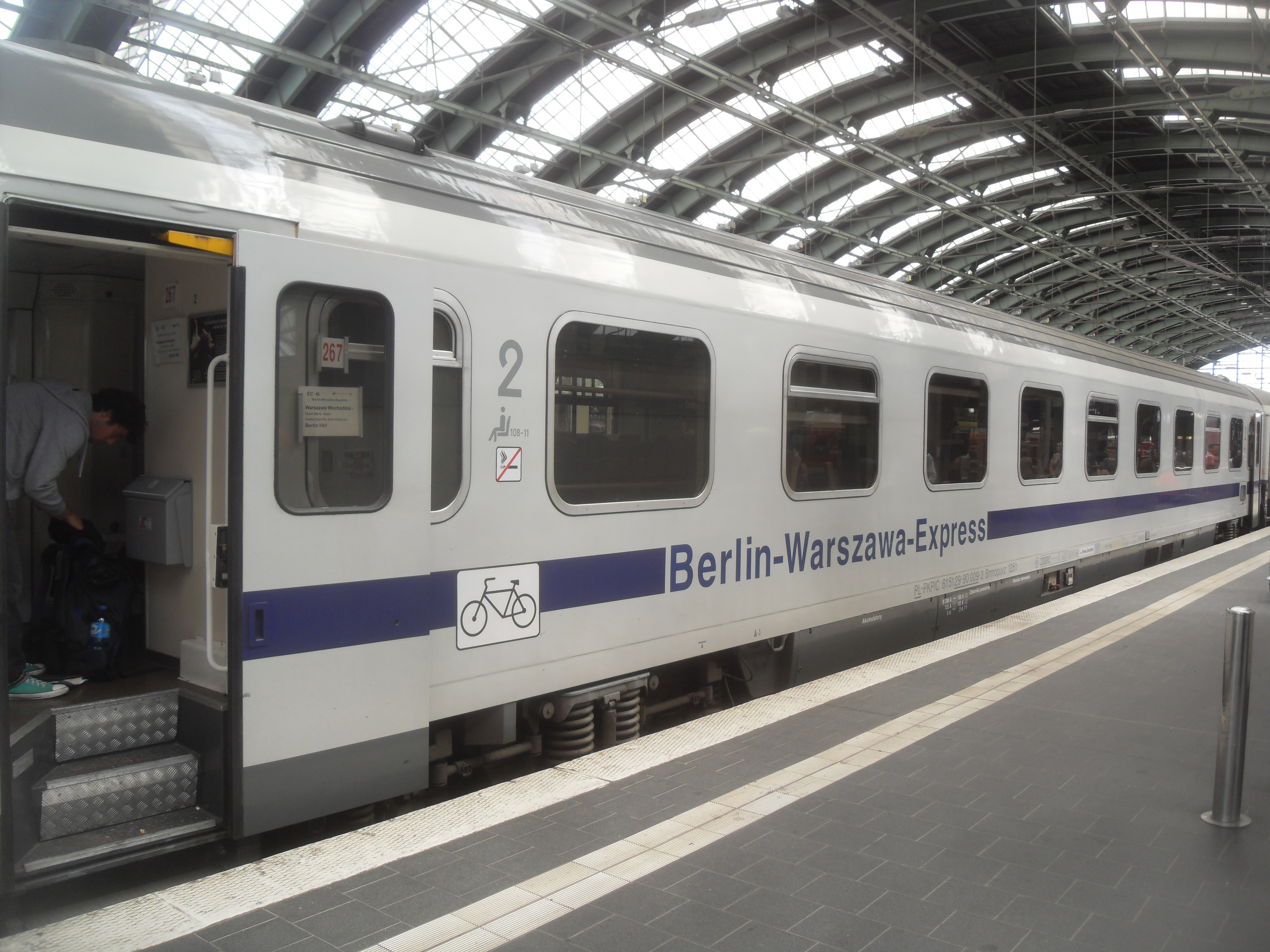
Berlin-Warsaw Express in Berlin Ostbahnhof Station.

Signed on the 8 April 2008 H. Cegielski signed a contract with PKP Intercity to deliver 17 passenger carriages in which included the 3×156A, 3×157A, 3×158A i 8×159A carriages. The deliveries began in 2010 with three 158A passenger carriages. In the same year the company delivered three 159A. On the 4 October 2010, due to a lateness in delivery a three-page agreement was signed between the manufacturer, client and the insurance company. This agreed to give back to PKP Intercity zl 21 million, in which the delivery ended at 14 carriages instead of the 17 ordered, the client had cancelled the 157A. The new passenger carriages were given the use for Express Intercity and EuroCity.

On the 18 October 2012 PKP Intercity signed a contract with H. Cegielski for 25 new passenger carriages with a minimum speed of 160 km/h (99 mph) for the use for PKP Intercity from Wrocław to Gdynia. H. Cegielski suggested 164A, 165A, 166A and 167A, passenger carriages with a maximum speed of 200 km/h (124 mph) which agree with the UIC for the type Z1. H. Cegielski began the deliveries at the beginning of January 2014 delivering four units of 166A and two 167A (later registered as 156A variation). After delivering 167A the PKP Intercity Mieszko route began operating their route in the half of June 2014. Another 3 167A passenger carriages were successfully delivered in July 2014, which made the second depot for the PKP Intercity Przemysław. Altogether 4 batches of passenger carriages have been delivered which included an additional buffet carriage.
