= HCP Z2 =

Polish passenger cars

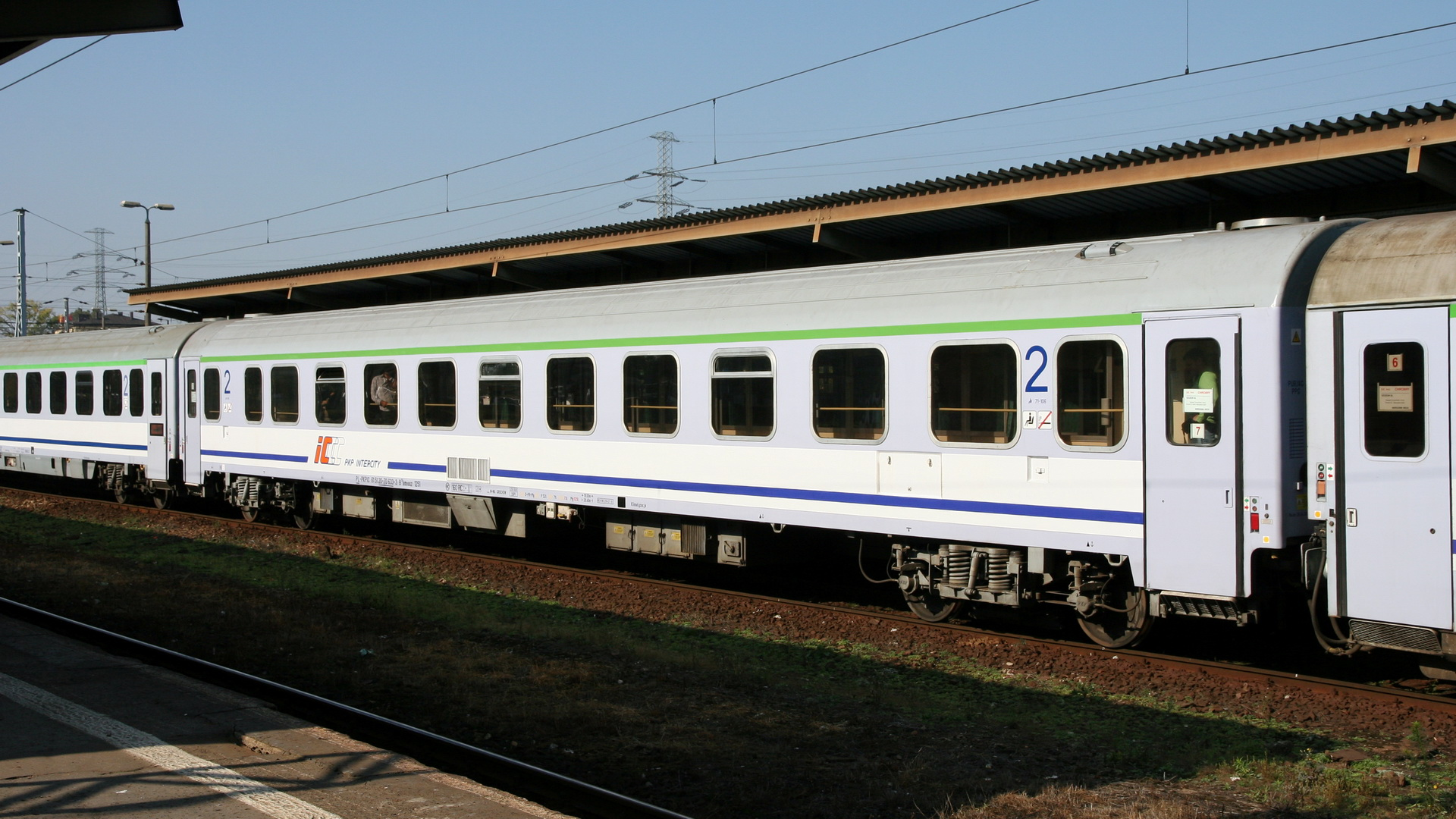
- 144Aa – second-class carriage with seats for people with disabilities
- Manufacturer: H. Cegielski – Poznań
- Assembly: Poznań; Poland
- Constructed: 1988–1996
- Operators: PKP Intercity

Specifications
- Train length: 26,400 mm (1,040 in)
- Width: 2,824 mm (111.2 in)
- Height: 4,050 mm (159 in)
- Wheel diameter: 920 mm (36 in)
- Maximum speed: 160 km/h (99 mph)
- UIC classification: 2'2'

HCP Z2 are passenger cars produced between 1988 and 1996 by H. Cegielski in Poznań, adapted to the UIC-Z2 standards. A total of 8 types of these cars were built, with 118 units in total. The only operator of these cars is PKP Intercity.

== History ==
=== First UIC-Z2 standard passenger cars produced in Poland ===
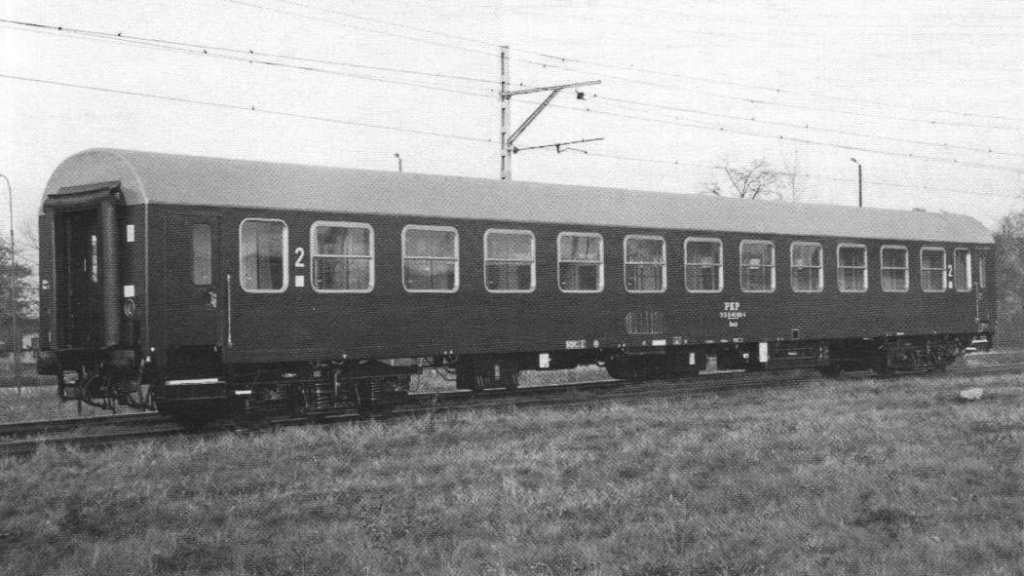
First Polish Z2 standard car – 127A from 1980

At the end of the 1970s, documentation for the first "high-comfort" cars in Poland (127A and 127Aa) meeting the UIC-Z2 standard was developed. The first two units were built by Pafawag in 1980 based on the documentation from the Tabor Railway Vehicle Institute. These were the first Z2 standard cars produced in the Eastern Bloc. Despite earlier declarations, Polish State Railways did not make a decision to continue work on Z standard cars.

=== First UIC-Z2 cars produced at H. Cegielski ===
It wasn't until the late 1980s, due to the ban on operating Y standard cars on Western European lines, that Polish State Railways decided to resume work on Z2 standard cars, this time at the H. Cegielski factories in Poznań. The Z2 standard car project for H. Cegielski was developed by the Tabor Railway Vehicle Institute based on the design and operational experiences of the 127A cars.

On 30 December 1988, the H. Cegielski factories produced the first two prototype Z2 standard cars – 134Aa. Based on the experiences from the production of the 134Aa cars, in 1991, H. Cegielski built 6 more prototype cars: 2 couchettes 134Ab, 2 two-car units 136A, and 2 single-car units 139A.

In November 1992, H. Cegielski began serial deliveries of Z2 cars, starting with 9 couchettes 134Ab, and in December of the same year, H. Cegielski delivered the last couchette 134Ab and 6 two-car units 136A. Deliveries of the single-car units 136A continued throughout 1993, with a total of 36 units delivered that year. In April 1993, deliveries of the serial single-car units 139A began, and the deliveries were completed in June of the same year, with a total of 15 139A cars delivered. At the beginning of 1994, the last 2 two-car units 136A were delivered.

=== Second generation UIC-Z2 cars from H. Cegielski ===
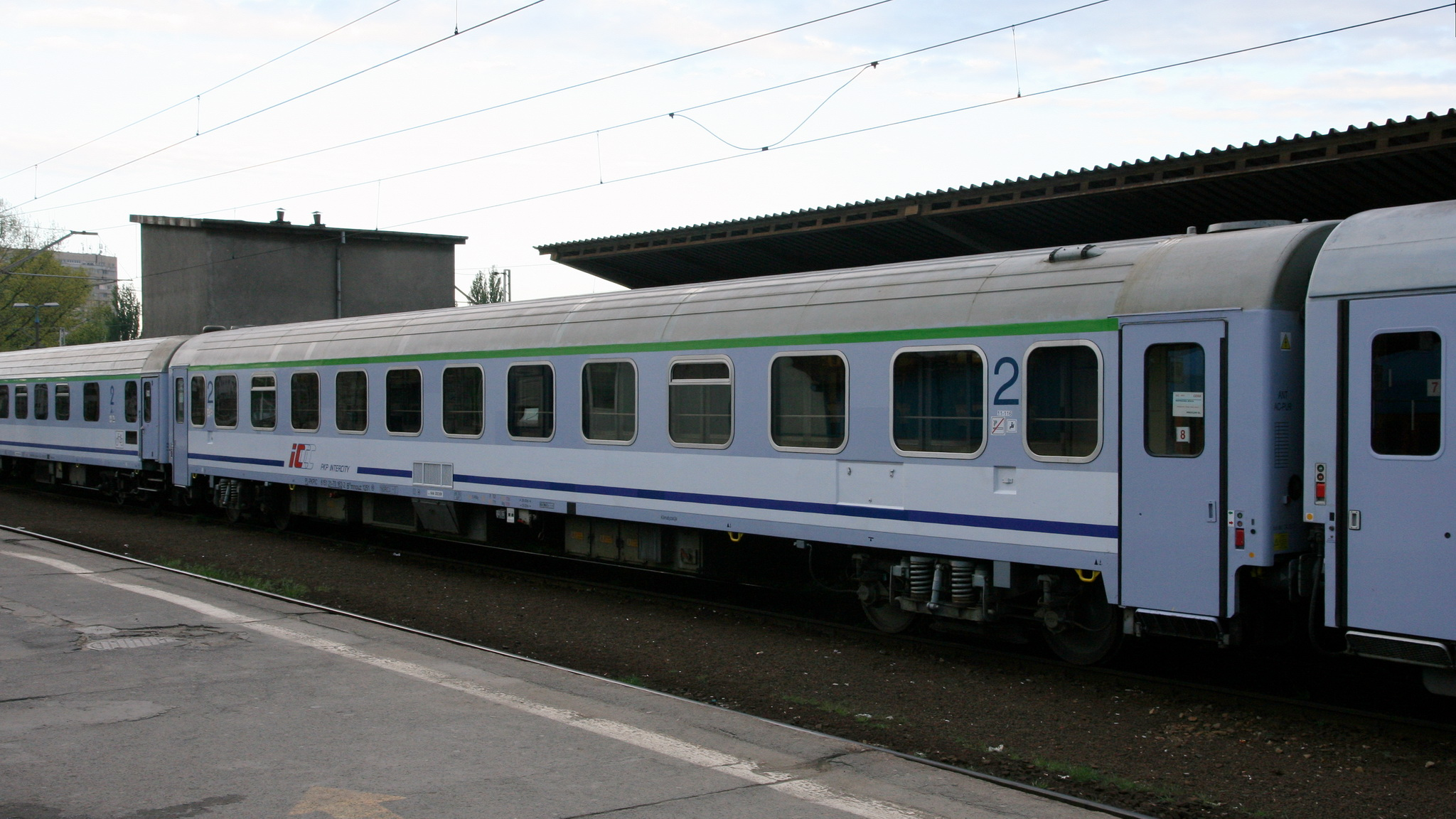
Car 144A

In 1994, H. Cegielski factories produced a series of 8 single-car units 145A. These were the first air-conditioned cars in Poland, as well as the first air-conditioned cars produced in Poland. In May and June, 4 of these cars were delivered to the Polish State Railways. In 1994, the first air-conditioned two-car units in Poland were also produced – the 144A cars. Between June 1994 and March 1995, Polish State Railways received 23 of these cars. In March 1995, Polish State Railways received 2 more 144Aa cars, which differed from the 144A by replacing two 6-person compartments with a compartment for 2 people in wheelchairs and 3 people accompanying them. In the 144Aa cars, one of the restrooms was also enlarged so that people in wheelchairs could use it. In 1996, H. Cegielski delivered 10 more single-car units 145Ab to the Polish State Railways, which differed from the 145A cars by replacing 3 six-person compartments with 4-person business class compartments.

=== Presentations at exhibitions and participation in films ===
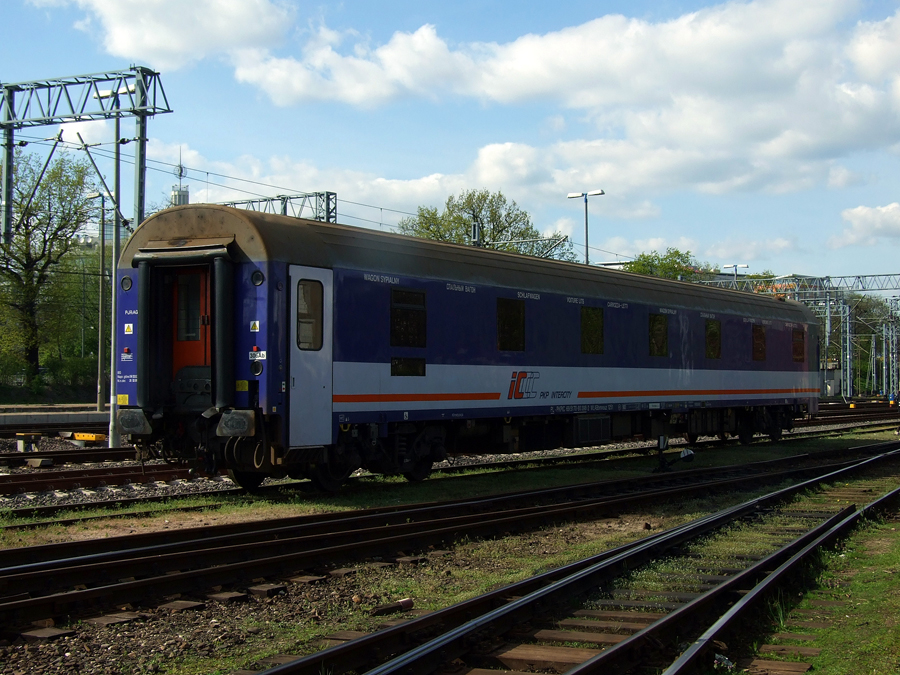
306Ab car was presented at the Trako Fair in 2003

In 1994, at the Poznań International Fair, the 145A car was presented, and in 1996, the 145Ab car was showcased.

One of the 134Aa cars was used in an episode of the series Ekstradycja.

In 2003, at the Trako Fair in Gdańsk and in 2004 at the InnoTrans fair in Berlin, the 306Ab car (a modernization of the Pesa 136A car) was presented. In 2011, the 134Ac car (a modernization of the Newag 134Aa car) was displayed at Trako. At the 2017 Trako, PKP Intercity presented a 144A car modernized by FPS.

=== End of UIC-Z2 car production ===
Due to the positive reception of the 145Ab cars by the Polish State Railways, which featured business class compartments, it was decided to order 2 additional cars with this type of compartment. However, these cars (145Ac) were significantly different from the 145Ab, primarily because they were built to the Z1 standard. The main difference between Z2 and Z1 standards is that Z1 cars are designed for speeds up to 200 km/h.

== Construction ==
Type	Category	Years of construction	Bogies	Doors	Heating	Toilet system	Weight	Number of compartments				liczba miejsc				Number of units	Source
Type	Category	Years of construction	Bogies	Doors	Heating	Toilet system	Weight	2nd class	1st class	Business class		2nd class	1st class	Business class		Number of units	Source
134Aa	sleeper	1988	4ANc	rotating-foldable	air	open	41.5 t	10	–	–	–	60/80	–	–	–	2	
134Ab	sleeper	1991–1992	MD523	sliding-push	air	open	41 t	10	–	–	–	60	–	–	–	12	
136A	compartment	1991–1994	MD523	sliding-push	air	open	39 t	11	–	–	–	66	–	–	–	44	
139A	compartment	1991–1993	MD523	sliding-push	air	open	38 t	–	9	–	–	–	54	–	–	17	
144A	compartment	1994–1995	MD523	sliding-push	air-conditioned	open	45.4 t	11	–	–	–	66	–	–	–	23	
144Aa	compartment	1995	MD523	sliding-push	air-conditioned	open	45.4 t	10	–	–	1	57	–	–	2	2	
145A	compartment	1994	MD523	sliding-push	air-conditioned	open	45.3 t	–	9	–	–	–	54	–	–	8	
145Ab	compartment	1996	MD523	sliding-push	air-conditioned	closed	47 t	–	6	3	–	–	36	12	–	10	

=== Body ===
The bodies of Z2 wagons produced by H. Cegielski are entirely welded constructions, where the underframe and body assemblies are combined into a uniform, self-supporting structure.

Initially, Z2 wagons were equipped with two-part windows in aluminum frames, with the upper part being operable. Only in the toilets were tilt windows installed, while in the vestibules, fixed windows were used. Starting with the 144A wagons (the first ones with air conditioning), the two-part windows were replaced by windows with a small, tilting upper section. On the compartment side, all windows were of the tilting type, while on the corridor side, most windows were fixed, with the remaining ones being tilting.

=== Bogies ===
During the design phase of the 134Aa wagons, it was planned to use 4ANhd and 4ANhd/2 bogies, which were structurally similar to the 4ANc bogies (widely used in Polish-made Y-standard wagons) but equipped with disc brakes (the 4ANc bogies had railway brakes). Ultimately, the 4ANhd and 4ANhd/2 bogies were not approved for production, and the 134Aa wagons were fitted with 4ANc (without a generator) and 4ANc/9 (with a generator) bogies, produced by ZNTK Opole. Due to having 4ANc bogies, the 134Aa wagons were not approved for operation on Western European tracks, but only on tracks in the countries of the former Eastern Bloc.

In the preparations for the production of the 134Ab, 136A, and 139A wagons, it was planned to use the GP-200 bogies, produced in East Germany and Czechoslovakia. However, due to the changing political situation, it became possible to order MD523 bogies, made in West Germany. These bogies, produced at the ABB Henschel facilities in Siegen, allowed for travel speeds of up to 160 km/h. They featured monoblock wheels with disc brakes, and during operation, they were further equipped with track brakes. These bogies were later installed in the remaining Z2-standard wagons produced at the H. Cegielski plants.

=== Modernizations ===
==== 134Ab ====
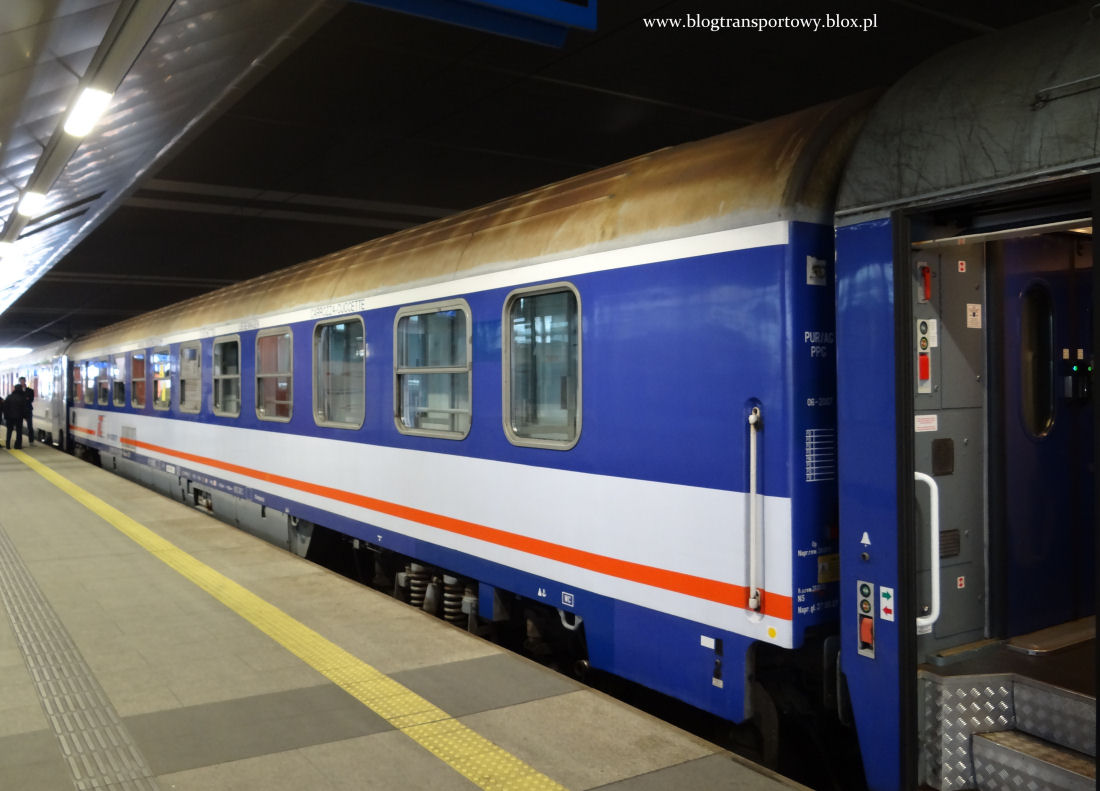
134Ab after modernization

In the first half of 2007, 10 out of the 12 produced 134Ab wagons underwent modernization at the Newag facility in Nowy Sącz. During this modernization, both the interior and exterior of the wagons were changed. The wagons were equipped with air conditioning and closed-system toilets, and one set of entry doors was removed. Additionally, the traditional external holders for destination boards and wagon numbers were replaced with special closed pockets with glass. The wagons were also repainted in the PKP Intercity colors.

As part of the modernization of 150 wagons for the Przemyśl–Szczecin route, a consortium consisting of Pesa and Pesa Mińsk Mazowiecki modernized the remaining two 134Ab wagons. The agreement was signed on 14 August 2013. The scope of the repairs was similar to those carried out by Newag.

==== 134Ac ====
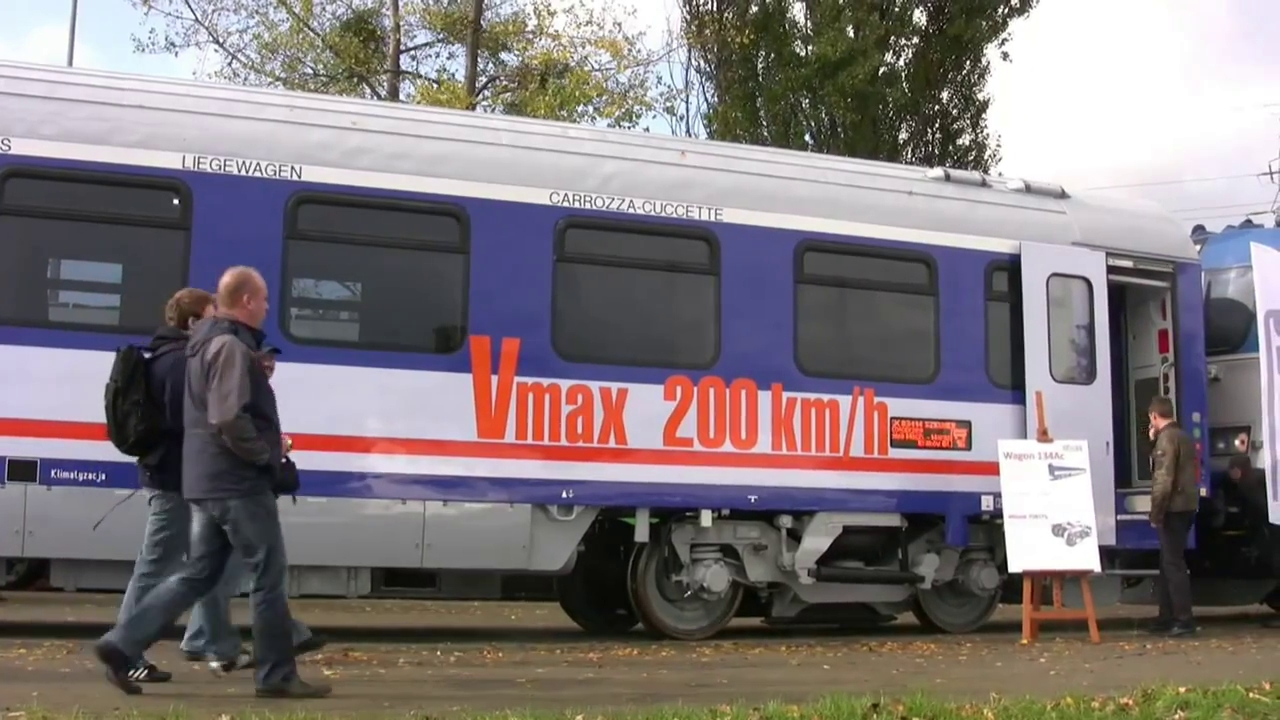
134Ac car during 2011 Trako Fair

In 2011, Newag modernized one of the two 134Aa couchettes to the 134Ac type. As part of the modernization, the couchette received new bogies – 70RSTb (produced by Newag), air conditioning, closed-system toilets, and external electronic displays. The couchette was approved for operation at a speed of 200 km/h.

On 5 January 2016, PKP Intercity announced a tender for the modernization of the second 134Aa wagon. Similar to the previous modernization of the 134Aa wagon, this wagon was to be adapted to a speed of 200 km/h and receive, among other upgrades, air conditioning, closed-system toilets, and external electronic displays. No bids were submitted for the tender. In July 2016, PKP Intercity re-announced the tender, but again, no offers were submitted. A subsequent tender in 2018 also received no bids.

==== 136A/171A ====
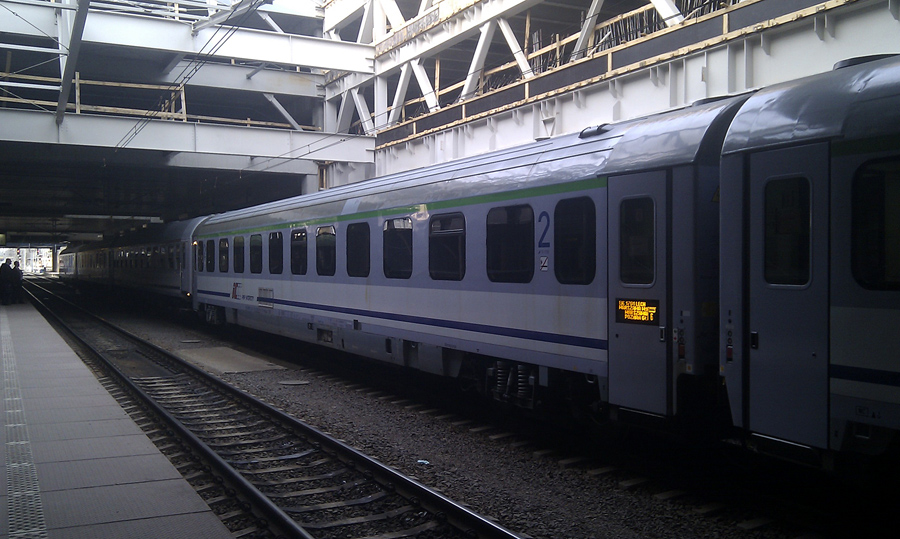
Modernized 136A

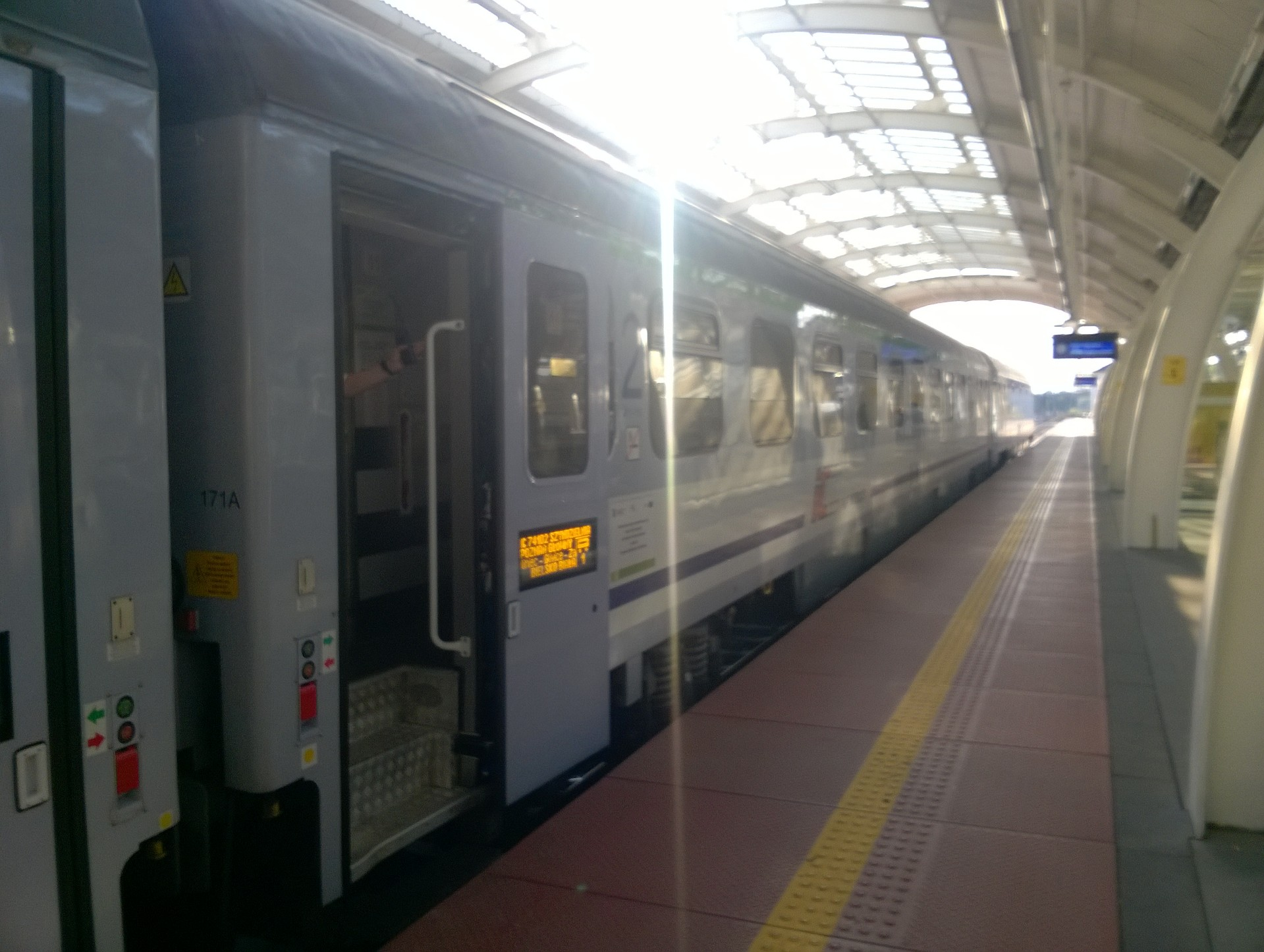
171A

In 2005 and 2006, 24 136A wagons were modernized at H. Cegielski's facilities during periodic overhauls. As part of this modernization, the wagons were equipped with air conditioning, upgraded interiors (including closed-system toilets and electrical outlets in compartments), and an improved running gear system (installation of track brakes). The scope of modernization for the first 10 wagons (subtype IC1) was slightly smaller than for the next 14 (subtype IC2), which received bonded windows instead of aluminum-framed ones and new end doors, though still manually operated with handles.

Between October 2007 and October 2008, another 13 136A wagons (subtypes IC3 and IC4) underwent major modernizations during general overhauls. Compared to subtype IC2, these upgrades included new push-button-operated end doors, protective covers for equipment between the bogies, and electronic displays both inside and outside the wagon. During the same period, an additional modernization was carried out on 7 subtype IC1 wagons and 12 subtype IC2 wagons, equipping them with new push-button-operated end doors (only for subtype IC1), protective covers for equipment between the bogies, and electronic displays inside and outside. These modernizations were designated IC5 and IC6, respectively.

By the end of 2008, after H. Cegielski completed the modernization of the 136A wagons, PKP Intercity had a total of 5 wagons with minor upgrades (IC1 and IC2) and 32 with extensive modernizations (IC3–IC6). Additionally, four 136A wagons had been converted into sleeping cars of type 306Ab a few years earlier, while three wagons remained unmodernized.

As part of the modernization of 150 wagons for the Przemyśl–Szczecin route, a consortium consisting of Pesa and Pesa Mińsk Mazowiecki upgraded 8 136A wagons. The contract was signed on 14 August 2013. The refurbishment included the installation of air conditioning, new closed-system toilet cabins, new push-button-operated end doors, electrical outlets at every seat, electronic displays inside and outside, compartment control panels with electronic screens, mobile signal boosters, and protective covers for equipment between the bogies. After modernization, these wagons were designated as type 171A.

==== 139A ====
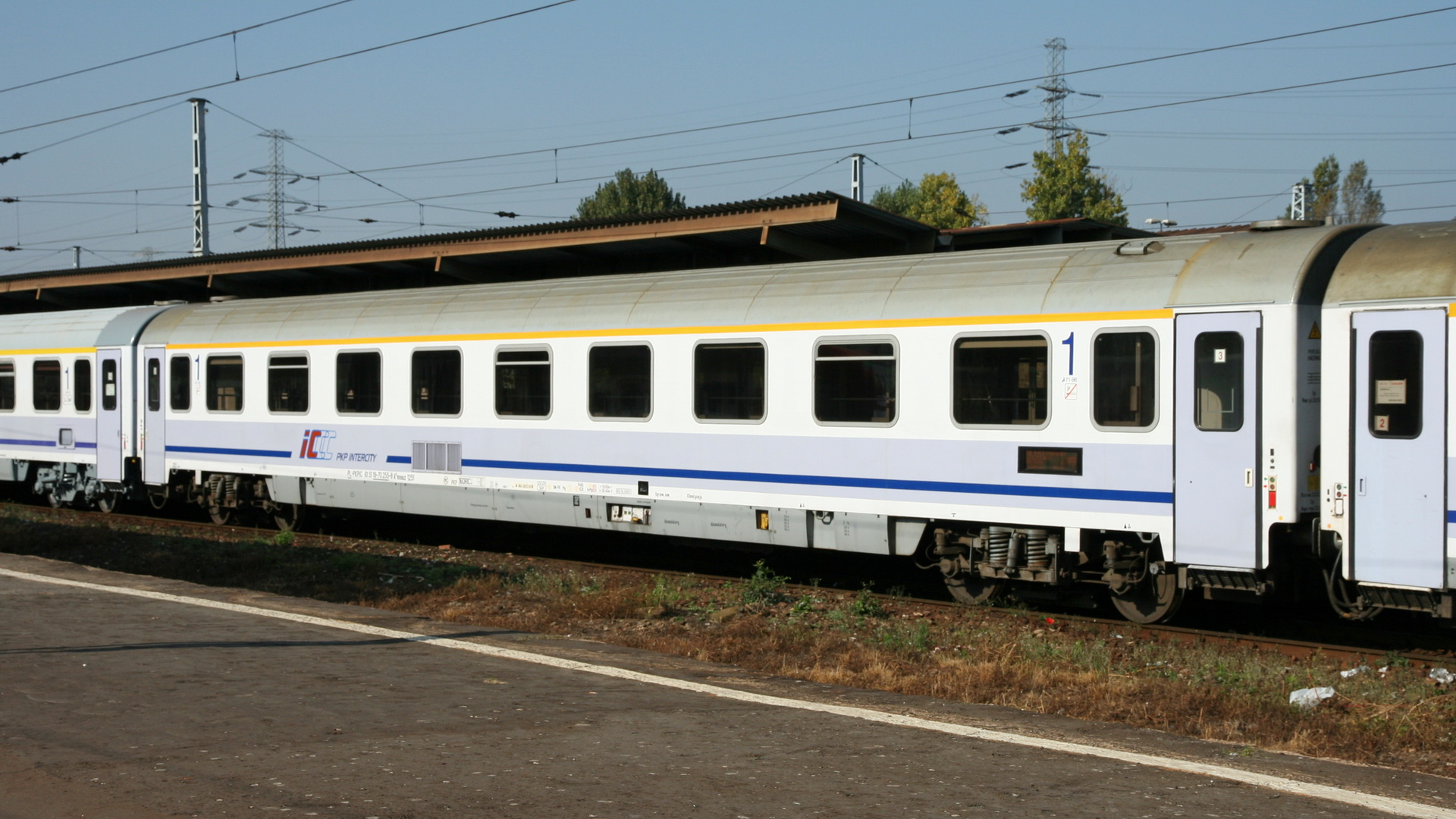
Modernized 139A

Between March 2005 and June 2006, 12 139A wagons were modernized at Rail Rolling Stock Opole during periodic overhauls. The modernization included the installation of air conditioning, non-opening windows in aluminum frames, closed-system toilets, and new PKP Intercity livery. Between November 2006 and May 2007, another 3 wagons were modernized, with the scope expanded to include new interiors, electrical outlets in compartments, new push-button-operated end doors, and bonded windows instead of framed ones.

From 2007 to 2008, during major overhauls, all 17 139A wagons were modernized (15 of them received a second modernization). All wagons were equipped with protective covers for equipment between the bogies and electronic displays both inside and outside. Additionally, 14 wagons that hadn't received interior modernizations before were fitted with new interiors, complete with electrical outlets, while 2 wagons without air conditioning were retrofitted with it.

==== 144A ====
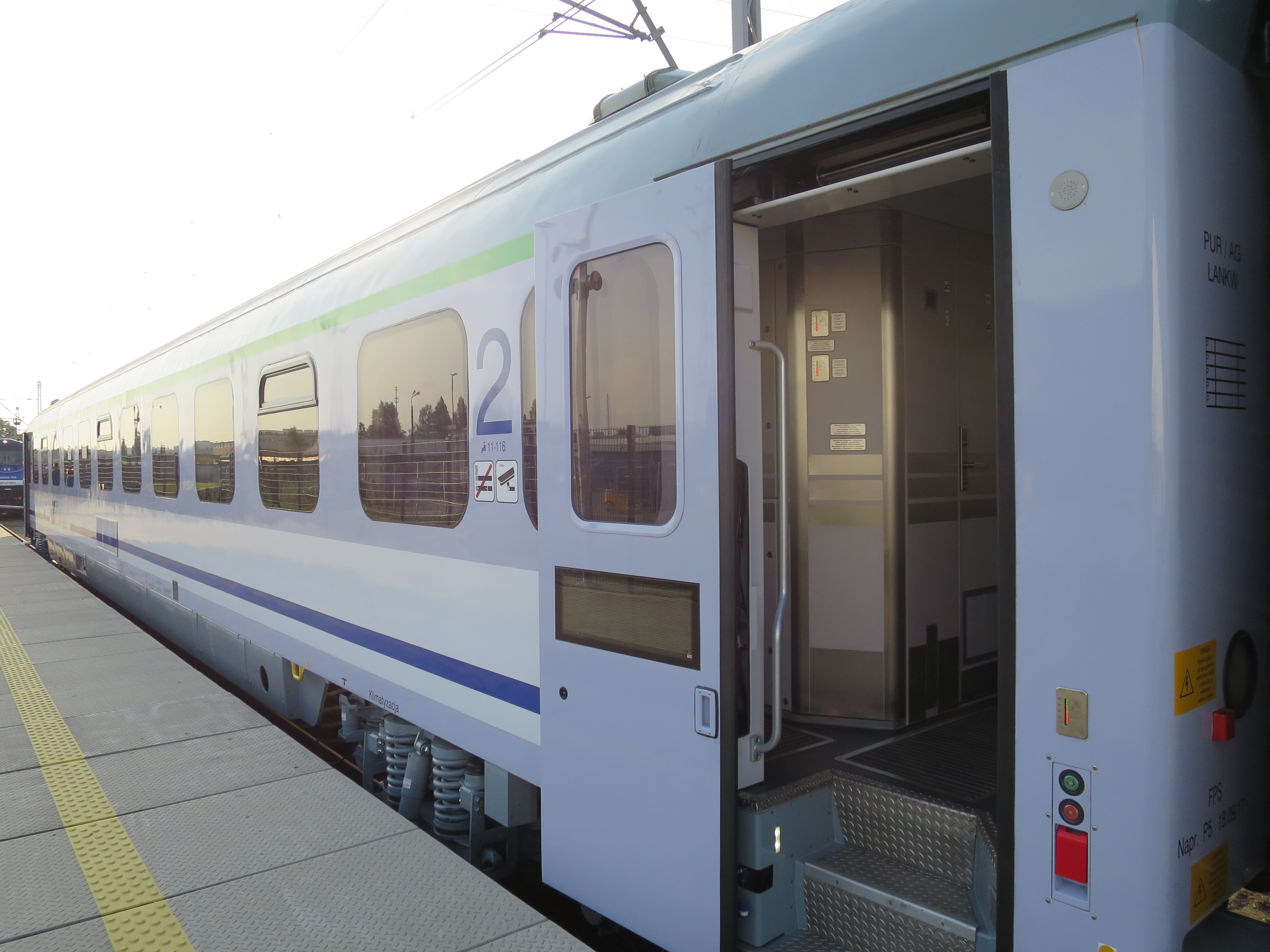
Modernized 144A car

On 30 December 2016, PKP Intercity signed a contract with H. Ciegielski for the modernization of 22 144A wagons. The modernization plan included the installation of closed-system toilets and electrical outlets. In September 2017, H. Ciegielski delivered the first 4 completed wagons, with the last ones delivered in December.

==== 306Ab ====
In 2003, 4 sleeping wagons of the 306Ab type were built at the Pesa facility in Bydgoszcz. These wagons were constructed from 4 second-class 136A-type wagons. The wagons were equipped with the SUW 2000 system, allowing them to operate on both 1,435 mm and 1,520 mm tracks without the need to change bogies.

==== 406A ====
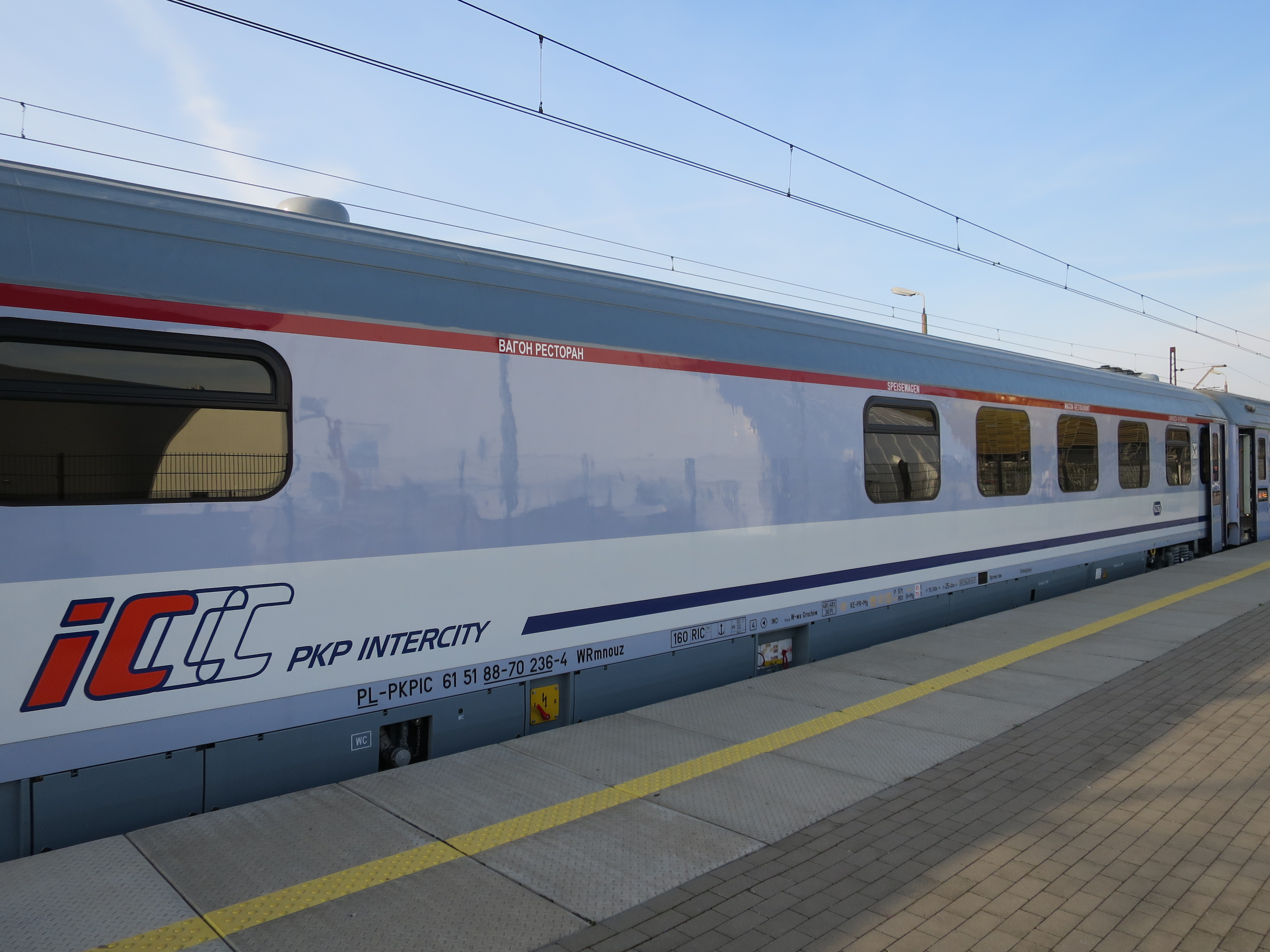
Restaurant car 406A

On 5 January 2015, PKP Intercity announced a tender for the modernization of 2 144A-type and 8 145A-type wagons to convert them into dining cars. The modified wagons were to feature 36 seats (6 four-person tables and 6 two-person tables) and a social compartment for staff with three bunk beds and a closed-system toilet cabin, accessible only by the crew. The only offer was submitted by Pesa, and on 9 June, a contract was signed for the modernization. After modernization, the wagons were assigned the 406A type, which was also used for other wagons previously converted into restaurant cars.

In 2018, PKP Intercity announced a tender to convert 10 145Ab-type wagons into restaurant cars. The only offer was submitted by H. Cegielski, and on 15 February 2019, a contract was signed with H. Cegielski. The modified wagons featured 12 tables with 36 seats, air conditioning, Wi-Fi, and mobile signal boosters. These wagons were assigned the 406A-40 type, with modernization completed in November 2020.

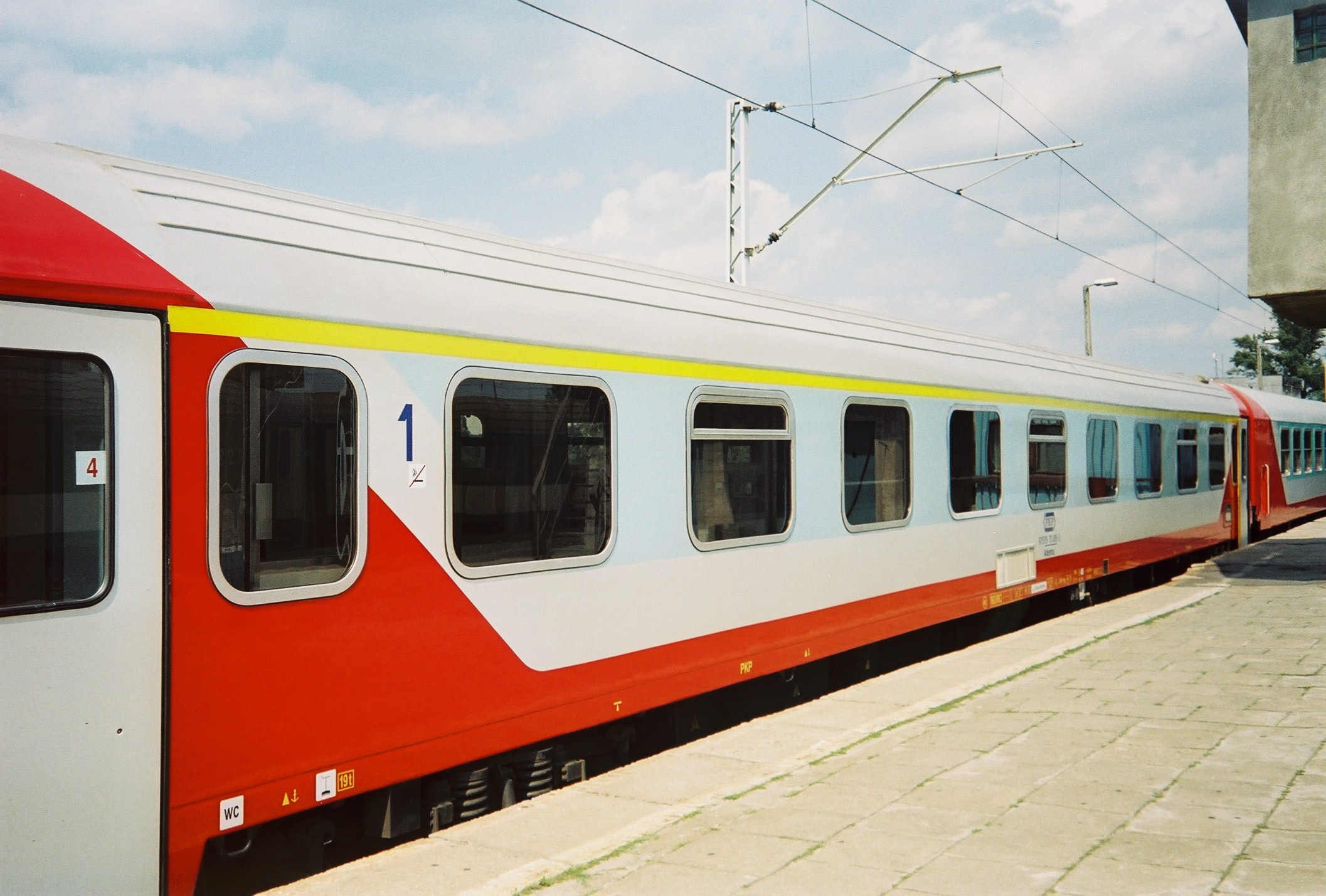
145Ab in the Polish State Railways colors

== Exploitation ==
Country	Carrier	Type	Series	Years in service	Number (original)	Source
Poland	PKP Intercity	134Aa	Bcdmnu	1989–?	0 (2)	
Poland	PKP Intercity	134Ab	Bc^{10}mnouz	since 1991	12	
Poland	PKP Intercity	134Ac	Bc^{10}mnouz	since 2012	1	
Poland	PKP Intercity	136A	B^{11}mnouz	since 1992	40 (44)	
Poland	PKP Intercity	139A	A^{9}mnouz	since 1993	17	
Poland	PKP Intercity	144A	B^{11}mnouz	since 1994	23	
Poland	PKP Intercity	144Aa	B^{10}bmnouz	since 1995	2	
Poland	PKP Intercity	145A	A^{9}mnouz	since 1994	8	
Poland	PKP Intercity	145Ab	A^{9}emnouz	since 1996	0 (10)	
Poland	PKP Intercity	306Ab	WLABbmnouz	since 2003	4	
Poland	PKP Intercity	406A-40		since 2020	10	

All wagons were purchased by the Polish State Railways; however, in 2001, PKP Intercity was established, taking over the operation of InterCity and EuroCity services along with the wagons previously used for these connections.

=== Couchette cars ===
At the turn of 1988 and 1989, 2 couchette cars of type 134Aa were assigned to the Warszawa Grochów railway station, where they were tested by the Railway Institute from November 1989 to December 1990. These wagons were not approved for operation in Western countries, only in Poland and Eastern Bloc countries. However, in the early 1990s, Austrian Federal Railways allowed the 134Aa wagons to operate on the overnight Chopin train connecting Warsaw and Vienna.

At the end of 1991, Polish State Railways received the first 2 couchette cars of type 134Ab, followed by another 10 at the end of 1992. All these wagons were assigned to Grochów and mainly used for international services. Initially, they replaced the 134Aa wagons on the Chopin train, which were then transferred to domestic services. Later, the 134Ab wagons also served the Jan Kiepura train linking Warsaw with Cologne and Frankfurt, and later with Brussels, as well as the Batory train connecting Warsaw with Budapest, and trains to Prague and Berlin.

=== Passenger cars ===
At the end of 1991, Polish State Railways received the first 2 two-car units of type 136A and 2 single units of type 139A. Deliveries of these wagons were completed in early 1994, with a total of 44 two-car units and 17 single units being delivered. Initially, these wagons were assigned to Grochów, but later some were stationed in Kraków and Lublin. These wagons were used for InterCity services, as well as some EuroCity services.

In 1994 and 1995, Polish State Railways received 23 two-car units of type 144A, 2 two-car units of type 144Aa, and 8 single units of type 145A. All these wagons were assigned to Grochów and used for InterCity and EuroCity services. In September 1995, one of the 145A wagons was involved in the derailment of the IC Sawa train near Psary.

=== Business-class cars ===
In 1996, Polish State Railways received 10 wagons with business-class compartments, which were assigned to Grochów. Although these wagons were approved for international service, they were used solely for InterCity connections. This was due to the unusual number of seats in the business-class compartments.

=== Sleeping cars ===
In 2003, four two-car units of type 136A were converted into sleeping cars for the night train between Kraków and Kyiv.
