= 158A =

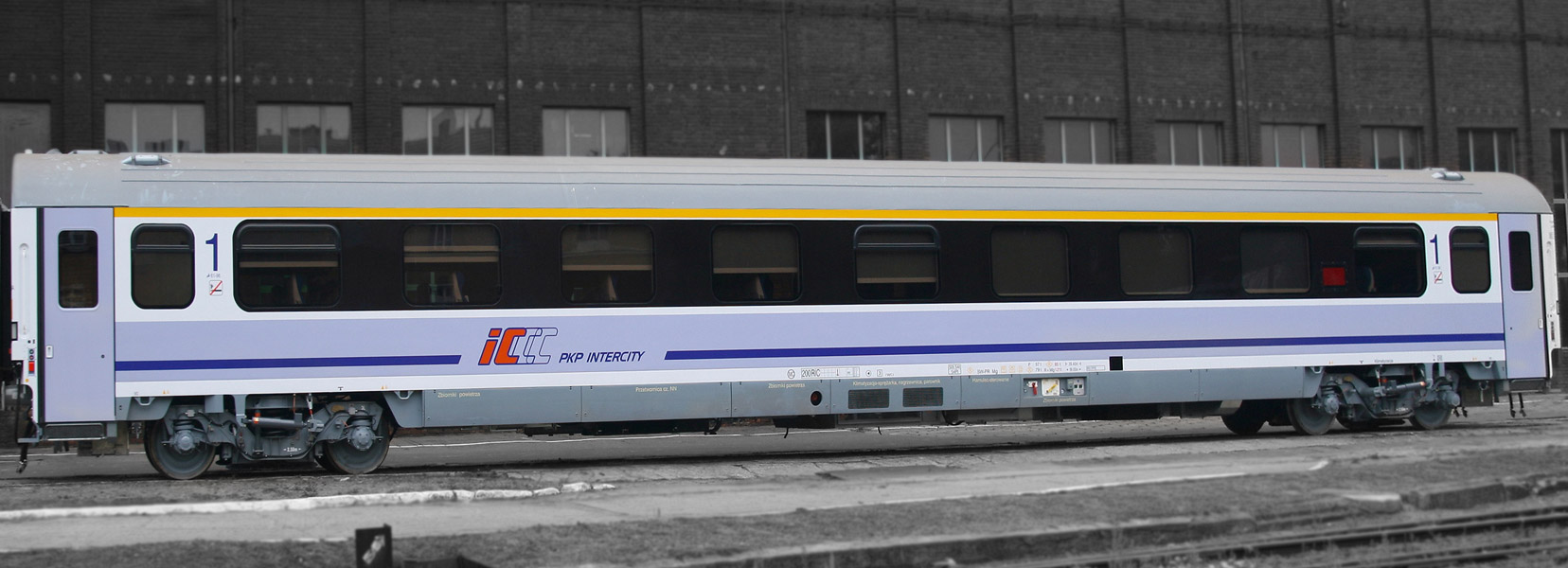
- 158A – an open saloon passenger carriage.

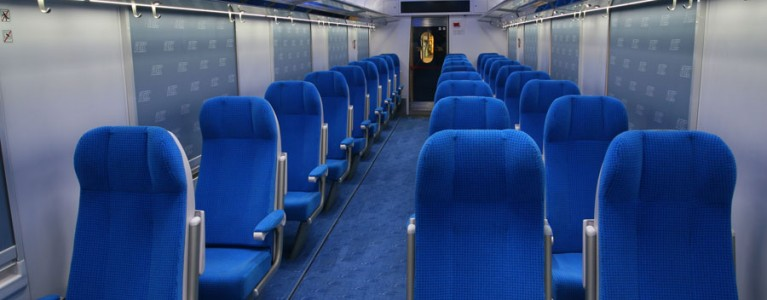
- The open layout saloon car.
- Manufacturer: H. Cegielski
- Family name: UIC-Z1
- Constructed: 2009-
- Capacity: 54

Specifications
- Car length: 26 400 mm
- Width: 2824 mm
- Height: 4050 mm
- Entry: Step
- Maximum speed: 200 km/h
- Weight: 50000 kg
- Track gauge: 1,435 mm (4 ft 8 1/2 in) standard gauge

158A is a train carriage built by H. Cegielski in Poznań. The train carriage is built for national and international passenger transportation with a maximum speed of 200 km/h on tracks with a width of 1435 mm.

== Specification ==
=== Carriage body structure ===
The chassis and bodywork is a welded structure made of carbon steel with high strength and resistance to corrosion. The whole carriage is covered with corrosion protection, which, together with a covering paint ensures long-term durability of the wagon body. The spaces in the internal walls and the roof is covered with damping mats of a non-combustible material.

=== Passenger compartment ===
In the interior of the passenger compartment there are arranged in series, seats made out of wool fabric. Above the windows there are placed racks for luggage and a panel fitted with individual lighting for each seat, the monitor includes the lighting setup and seating reservation. Above each carriage door there is a display with information regarding the time, speed and railway stations. The interior lighting for the carriage is made up of uses LED lamps.
