= List of rolling stock used in Poland =

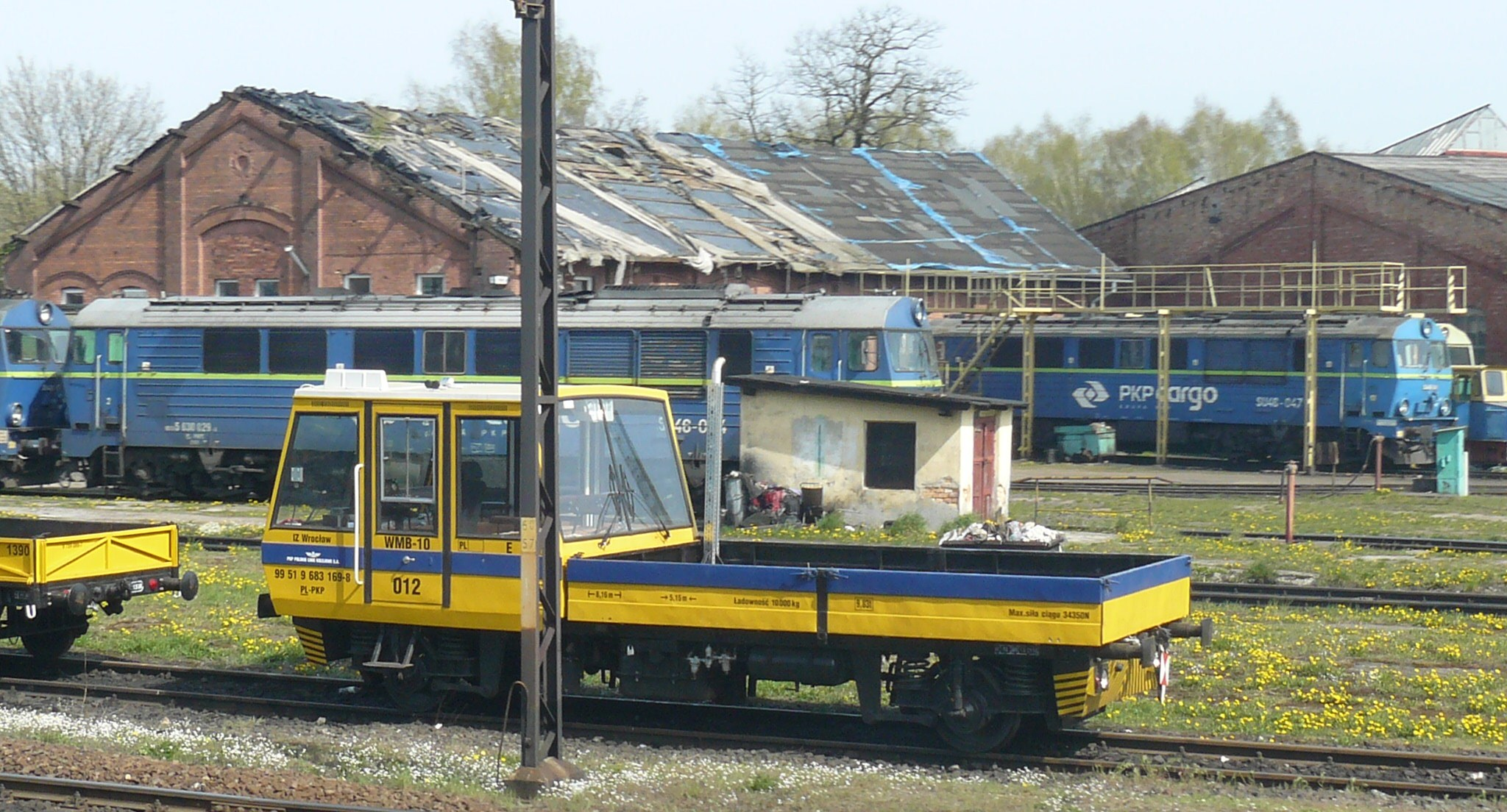
Węgliniec railway depot, WMB-10 draisine and SU46 locomotives

This list gives an overview of rolling stock that are used on the railways of Poland. Also included are the locomotives of the Polish State Railways and the rolling stock owned by foreign state railways certified for operation in Poland.

== Classification system ==
The system was introduced for the steam stock by the Ministry of Railways on 3 November 1922, shortly after Poland regained her independence (1918) when the Polish railroads inherited a variety of German, Austrian and Russian steam locomotives, each with its own type convention. It was put into use in 1923–1926 years. The adopted solution allows telling the locomotive type (passenger/freight/mixed), wheel arrangement, origin and some other information from the type designation. After World War II a similar system was also adapted for diesel and electric locomotives in 1959.

=== Steam stock ===
==== Steam locomotives ====
Steam locomotives from the foreign origin were at first classified by its foreign state railways until the introduction of the PKP classification system.

The steam locomotive designation introduced in 1922 consist of:

- The class type
- Serial number

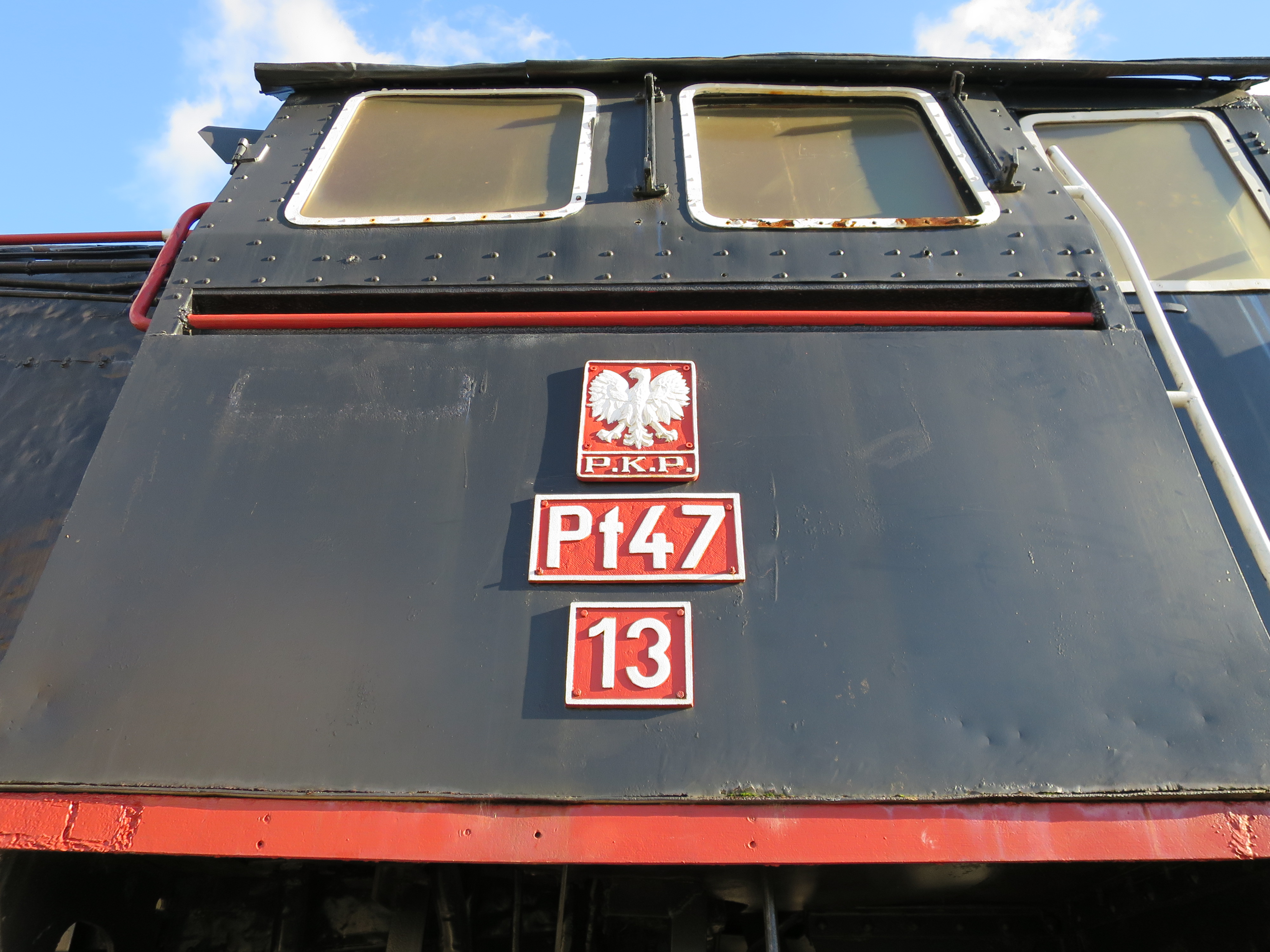
An example of a steam locomotive designation: (P) Express, (t) 2-8-2, (47) Purchased by PKP, approved for production in 1947. Three numbers (13) below the class type are the serial number.

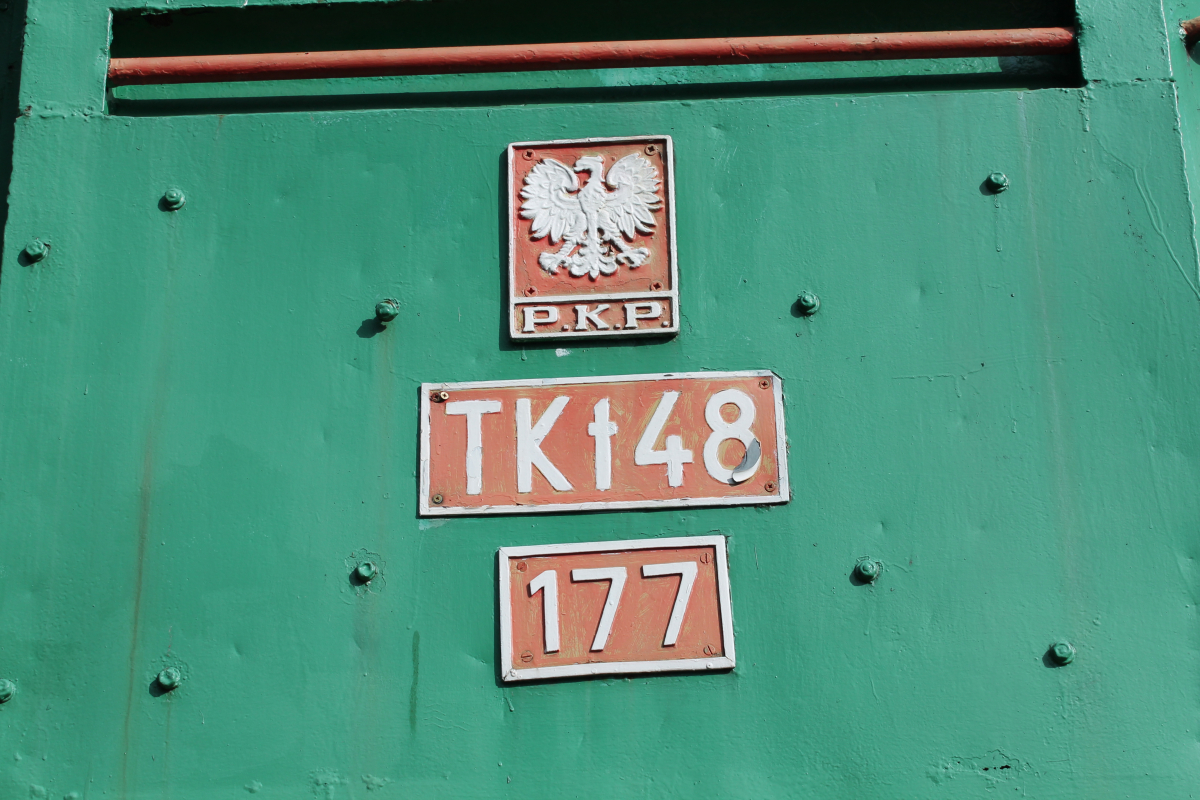
Another example of a steam tank locomotive designation: (T) Freight, (K) Tank locomotive, (t) 2-8-2, (48) Purchased by PKP, approved for production in 1948. Three numbers (177) below the class type are the serial number.

Designation of the individual symbols in the class type

First digit – Intended traffic type

- P – Express locomotive (Polish: Pośpieszna)
- O – Passenger locomotive (Polish: Osobowa)
- T – Freight locomotive (Polish: Towarowa)

Digit between the traffic type and the wheel arrangement – Tank locomotive digit

- K – Tank locomotive (Polish: Kusy)

Second digit – Wheel arrangement type

- a – one driving axle, any number of unpowered axles
- b – 0-4-0
- c – 2-4-0 or 0-4-2
- d – 4-4-0 or 0-4-4
- e – 2-4-2
- f – 4-4-2 or 2-4-4
- g – two driving axles, more than three unpowered axles,
- h – 0-6-0
- i – 2-6-0 or 0-6-2
- k – 4-6-0 or 0-6-4
- l – 2-6-2
- m – 4-6-2
- n – 2-6-4
- o – three driving axles, more than three unpowered axles
- p – 0-8-0
- r – 2-8-0 or 0-8-2
- s – 4-8-0 or 0-8-4
- t – 2-8-2
- u – four driving axles, more than two unpowered axles
- w – 0-10-0
- y – 2-10-0
- z – five driving axles, more than one unpowered axle

Third, fourth and fifth digits – Locomotive's origin

- 1 – 10 – Prussian or German origin
- from 11 – Austrian origin
- 100 – different atypical stock acquired after 1945, including former private and industry locomotives
- from 101 – Foreign origin, acquired by PKP between 1918 and 1939
- from 20 – Purchased by PKP, the numbers describe the year of approval for production from the 20th century
- from 201 – Foreign origin or production, acquired by PKP after 1945

Optional sixth digit – Dash between the class type and the serial number (used only on the front of the locomotive)

Digits after the dash/below the class type – Serial number

During the war, most locomotives received designations by the railways from the occupying countries, or those boards that took them into use (Hungarian railways, Lithuanian railways, etc.). In 1946 the classification system from 1922 was returned, except that the steam locomotives of the pre-war production received new serial numbers.

Although in the number designation of the newly introduced class:

- the number range 1 – 10 included all standardized DRG classes, locomotives other than the Prussian railways of the former German countries (for example: Saxon Ok2, TKw3), and also built in Germany for other state railways (for example, OKa1, Tr7);
- the number designation '100' (for example TKh100) is distinguished by series in which unqualified locomotives have been grouped into existing groups, despite various design features;
- the number designation beginning from 201 were given to steam locomotives acquired after 1945 from the Allied states (from the demobile and UNRRA mission);
- the Ty246 class type was given to steam locomotives built in the United States for PKP's order.

==== Tenders ====
The tender designation consists of

- The class type
- Serial number

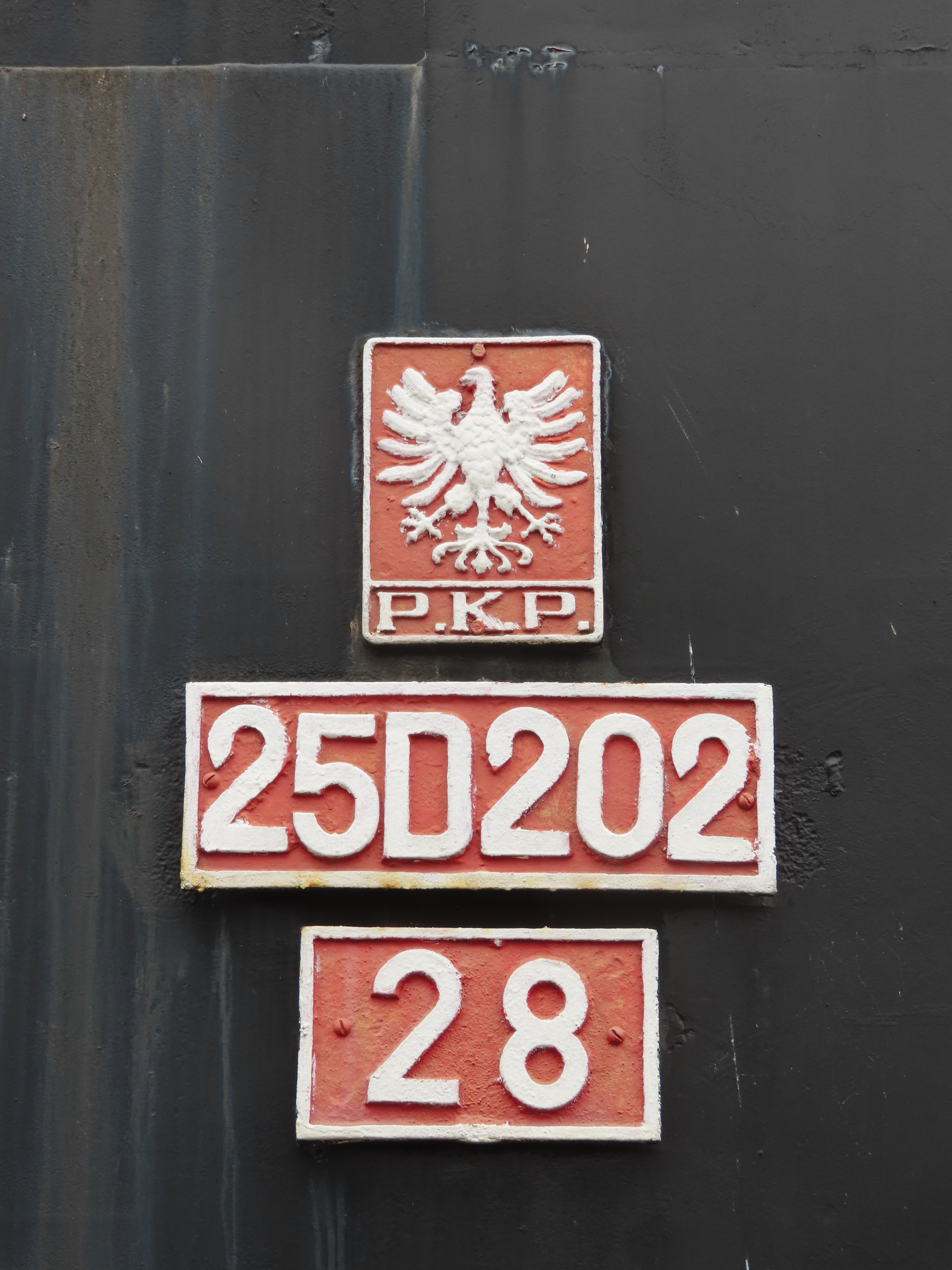
An example of a tender classification: (25) 25 m^{3} of water capacity (25,000 Liters), (D) 4 axles, (202) British production acquired by PKP after 1945. Two numbers (28) below the tender class type are the serial number.

Designation of the individual symbols in the tender class type

First and second digits – Water capacity in cubic meters (m^{3})

Third digit – Number of axles

- B – two axles
- C – three axles
- D – four axles

Fourth and fifth digits – Tender origin

- 1 – 10 – Prussian or German origin
- from 11 – Austrian origin
- from 101 – Foreign origin, acquired by PKP between 1918 and 1939
- from 20 – Purchased by PKP, the numbers describe the year of approval for production from the 20th century
- from 201 – Foreign origin or production, acquired by PKP after 1945

Digits below the class type – Serial number

After 1946, tenders built for PKP orders have a two digit numbers describing its origin, this also applied to German tenders (30D43) and built in the USA (32D46). Tenders from German steam locomotives did not have orderly designations (for example, 26D5, 34D44), although in the case of the current origin, the designations weren't often applied on the rolling stock, at first the tenders didn't have serial numbers.

The uniform rules for designating all tenders with a class type and a serial number was introduced in 1972. Tenders rebuilt in the 1950s and equipped with a stoker had a water capacity designation changed to '26', below '27' (for example: 33D48 to 27D48); tenders in the 1970s received reconstructed chassis and new bogies – the origin designation was changed to '24' (for example, 32D29 to 32D74).

=== Diesel stock ===
==== Diesel locomotives ====
In the post-war period, low powered diesel locomotives used in the Polish railway of various origins weren't designated according to the uniform system. Its substitute was designating the first locomotives with an electric transmission delivered to PKP with the letter digit symbols (Lwe55, Lwe58), in which the number marked the year of approval of the design as for the steam locomotives and tenders.

The locomotive designation introduced in 1959 consist of:

- The class type
- Serial number

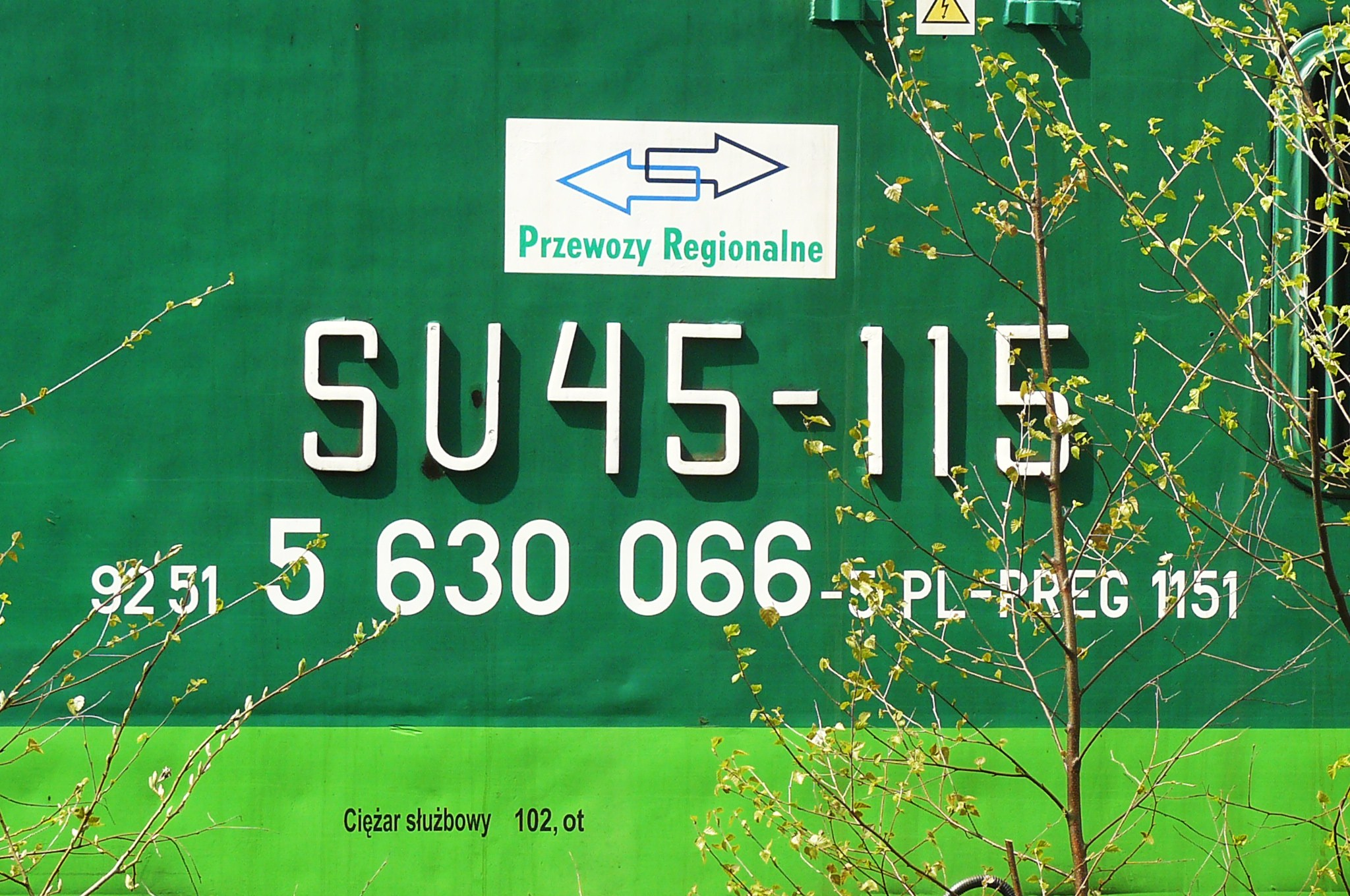
An example of a diesel locomotive designation: (S) Diesel, (U) Mixed traffic, (45) Electric transmission with multiple unit control. Three numbers (115) after a dash are the serial number.

Designation of the individual symbols in the class type

First digit – Traction type

- S – diesel locomotive (Polish: Spalinowa)

Second digit – Intended traffic type

- P – passenger traffic (Polish: Pasażerska)
- T – freight traffic (Polish: Towarowa)
- U – mixed traffic (Polish: Uniwersalna)
- M – shunting traffic (Polish: Manewrowa)

Third and fourth digits – Transmission type and multiple unit control

- 01 – 09 – Mechanical transmission without multiple unit control
- 10 – 14 – Mechanical transmission with multiple unit control
- 15 – 24 – Hydraulic transmission or hydrau-mechanical transmission without multiple unit control
- 25 – 29 – Hydraulic transmission or hydrau-mechanical transmission with multiple unit control
- 30 – 39 – Electric transmission without multiple unit control
- 40 – 49 – Electric transmission with multiple unit control

Fifth digit – Dash between the class type and the serial number

Digits after the dash – Serial number

In each group, the individual designs were determined by numbers according to the order of entry into service (for example, number range from 30 to 39: SM30, SM31, SP32). Especially for the SM42 and SP42 class, representing two different types used the same number “42” due to the same traction characteristics and the same basic components.

Locomotives with the same class received the next serial numbers starting from 01, when it was predicted a large number of examples, they received the serial numbers starting from 001. Separate ranges were highlighted by locomotives with the different design features, for example:

- ST44 starting from 001 – basic class
- ST44 starting from 2001 – intended for broad gauge

In the later years, some locomotives were undergoing modernization, initially in the scope of the train heating system. Locomotives SM30, SM42, SP45 received a new designation classified SP30, SU42 and SU45, remaining the unchanged serial numbers. The modernizations were later associated not only with the modification of the class, but also receiving a new serial number, for example:

- SP42 after the modernization was classified SU42 and renumbered starting from 501
- SU45 after the modernization was classified ST45 and renumbered starting from 01

==== Diesel railcars ====
===== 1959 classification =====
Railcars were designated according to the system applicable to passenger wagons. Railcar serial numbers were given starting from 90 001, for passenger cars were given starting from 93 001. The letter digit of the class containing basic information about the design features of the railcar wasn't related to the number designation.

The locomotive designation introduced in 1959 consist of:

- The class type
- Serial number

Designation of the individual symbols in the class type

First digit – Traction type

- S – diesel railcar (Polish: Spalinowa)

Second digit – Intended traffic type

- D – long-range traffic (Polish: Dalekobieżny)
- N – local traffic (Polish: Normalne)
- R – special purpose (mobile workshops, emergency use, etc.)

Third and fourth digits – Transmission type and multiple unit control

- 51 – 59 – Mechanical transmission without multiple unit control
- 60 – 69 – Mechanical transmission with multiple unit control
- 70 – 79 – Hydraulic transmission or hydrau-mechanical transmission without multiple unit control
- 80 – 89 – Hydraulic transmission or hydrau-mechanical transmission with multiple unit control
- 90 – 94 – Electric transmission without multiple unit control
- 95 – 99 – Electric transmission with multiple unit control

Optional Fifth digit – Dash between the class type and the serial number

Digits after the dash/next to the class type – Serial number

In each group the individual designs were designated with numbers according to the order of entry into service (for example, number range from 69 to 69: SN60, SN61) The two digit number shouldn't be repeated when designating railcars of different intended traffic types, however this rule was broken by giving the designations SN51 and SN52 together with SR51 and SR52 (the standard provided the differentiation of the designation for the railcars).

Railcars with the same class received next serial numbers starting from 01 or 001. Similarly to the locomotives, separate ranges were highlighted by railcars with the different design features, for example:

- SN61 starting from 01 – basic class
- SN61 starting from 500 – railcars with the new powertrain

Passenger cars for the Polish State Railway railcars meant being accepted for the railcars according to the rules.

===== Classification before 1939 =====
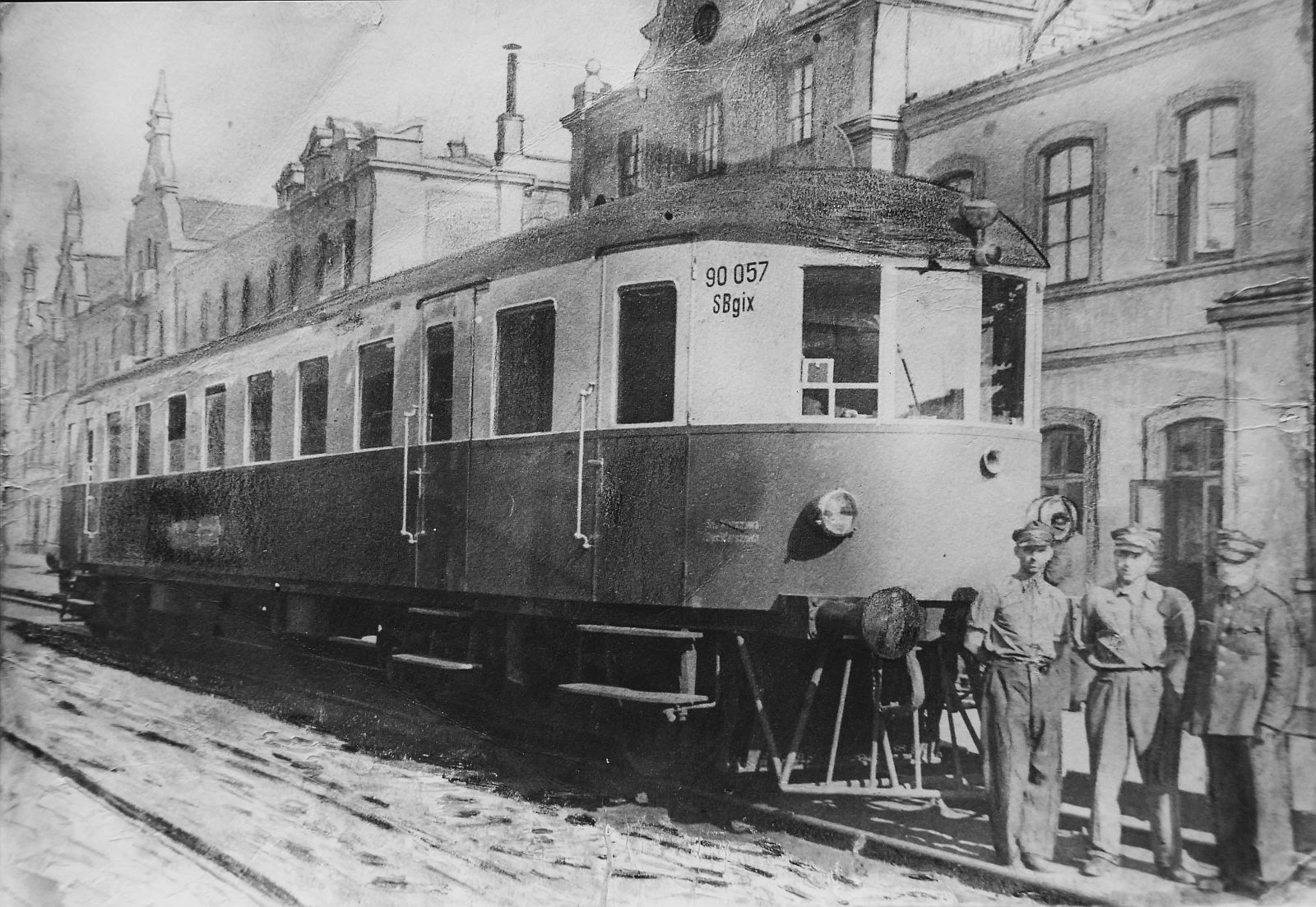
An example of a railcar designation used before 1939 (seen next to the door and the cab windshield of the railcar): (90 057) Gdańsk distribution, (S) Diesel traction, (B) 2nd class, (g) mail compartment, (i) seats placed on both sides of inner gangway, (x) 4 axle railcar.

Rules for designating railcars from PKP were set out in the Regulations on marking and numbering of M37 railcars. Railcars were designated according to the rules laid down for passenger wagons for passenger transport, where in the first digit of the class, a large letter was placed specifying the power type:

- P – railcar with a steam engine
- S – railcar with a diesel engine
- E – railcar with a battery electric engine

Next digits were given according to the rules applicable for railcars and passenger wagons. Large letters defined the type of travel class:

- A – 1st class
- B – 2nd class
- BC – 2nd/3rd class
- CD – 3rd/4th class

Small letters arranged in the alphabetical order meant the design features:

- g – mail compartment
- i – seats placed on both sides of inner gangway
- y – 3 axle railcar
- x – 4 axle railcar

4th class was only found in the former areas of the Prussian State Railways distribution, until the withdrawal in 1934.

Class designations in the railcar classes serving only MtE trains were only formally assigned, as the trains had a special single tariff, slightly higher than an express train in the 3rd class. Therefore the above-mentioned railcars didn't applied the class designation using numbers. The class designation in the class type standardly corresponded to the 2nd class, except the railcars by Austro-Daimler, which were the first to have only four seats on the wagon width (2+2) providing a higher standard of travel.

The designated number group in the range of 90 000 to 90 499 was applied to the railcars, originally without division into a separation of the group of numbers for each type of the railcar. The numbering was given in the following order according to the allocation of individual distributions:

- From 90 001 – Radom distribution
- From 90 011 – Poznań distribution
- From 90 031 – Gdańsk distribution
- From 90 061 – Kraków distribution

Beginning in 1929, the railcars were entered in the register filling in the gaps in the numbering.

Separating the groups for railcars and wagons with the electric traction and the wagons with the diesel traction was only carried out during the delivery of rolling stock for the electrified Warsaw network.

===== Classification after 1945 =====
From the rules applied still in the M37 regulations, the designation by the capital letter M with a small digit meaning the power type was applied to railcars that entered service after the war:

- Ms – railcar with a diesel engine
- Ma – railcar with a battery electric engine
- D – passenger wagon

The class designation and design features were given according to the existing rules, as before 1939.

In 1956 due to the withdrawal of the 1st class, the 1st class and 2nd class railcars were appropriately placed on 1st class and 2nd class railcars, which involved changing the class type, for example from MsCi to MsBi, however without changing the serial number.

For railcars and passenger wagons, new groups of six-digit numbers with the first digit 0 was applied, which was distinguished from the pre-war designation:

- From 090 000 – diesel railcar
- From 091 000 – passenger wagon
- From 090 700 – railcars for overhead line maintenance (from 1954)

==== Diesel railbuses ====
With the amendment to the rules for designating rolling stock in 1969, separate designation for railbuses and passenger wagons were applied. The class type creates a 2 digit symbol “SA” and a three digit symbol indicating the wagon type without distinguishing the type of transmission and the control of the wagon.

The railbus designation consist of:

- The class type
- Serial number

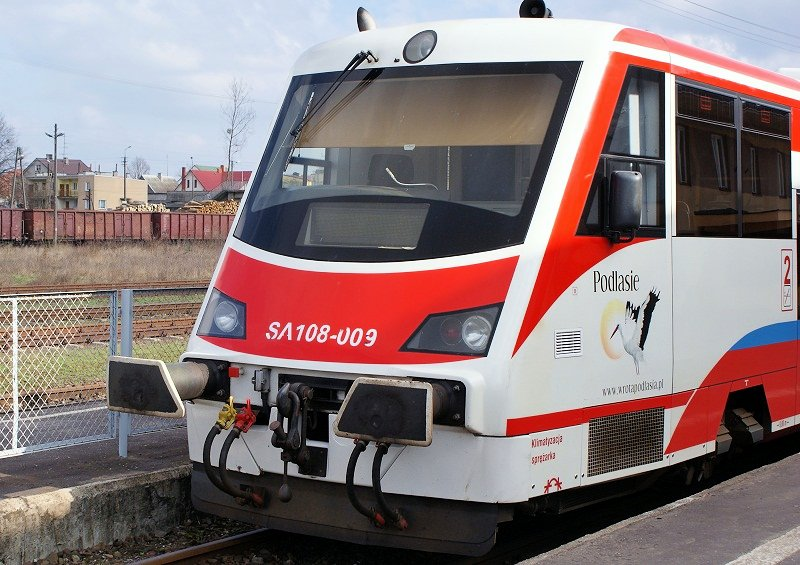
An example of a railbus designation: (S) Diesel, (A) Railbus, (108) Railbus. Three numbers (009) after a dash are a serial number.

Designation of the individual symbols in the class type

First digit – Traction type

- S – diesel (Polish: Spalinowa)

Second digit – Intended traffic type

- A – railbus (Polish: Autobus szynowy)

Third, fourth and fifth digits – Wagon type and order of entering into service

- 101 - 110 – Railbus (implicity with power type)
- 111 – 120 – Passenger wagon intended for railbuses
- 121 – 130 – Control car

Sixth digit – Dash between the class type and the serial number

Digits after the dash – Serial number

The rules for determining the order of designations and serial numbers within each series remained the same as those for locomotives and railcars.

However due to the number range (101 – 110) being out of free designations for the next designs, the next number range starting from 131 was introduced.

When describing the rules of designating railbuses established for the PKP needs, it should be emphasized that owners of the stock using them often did not pay attention to the design features specified in the standard. An example is the SN81 class, which is designated as a railbus, in addition to a mechanical transmission and without a multiple unit control. In turn the symbol “SA” intended for light stock was given for most designs, for example for the heavy three carriage multiple units. However this state of affairs is influenced by the failure to adapt the rules of designation to the current state, especially the failure to include multiple units in them.

==== Classification different from the rules by PKP ====
Unlike companies originating from PKP, where recently there were rules for designating and numbering of rolling stock, other carriers use different methods of designation, most often not creating their own rules, but using the already existing designation of rolling stock. For a number of years, the unwritten rule remained the separation of the class type and the serial number.

Different methods of designating rolling stock can be seen below the list

Rolling stock class type built in Poland may include one of the designations:

- Rolling stock design type symbol (for example: 311D, 222M)
- Fablok factory type designation (for example : Ls40, Ls800)
- PKP class type (for example: SM30, SM42)

Serial number placed next or below the class type means:

- Next example on a given locomotive type (for example: 401Da-007)
- Factory designation of the stock (for example: Ls40-5247)
- Serial number given by the manufacturer in the intervals other than PKP (for example: for SM30 above 500, for SM42 above 2000)
- Industrial number (Next established with the locomotive type) or the fixed asset regristration number

New imported locomotives were often designated with the manufacturer's symbol corresponding the series designation in the railway management (for example: M62, T448 with an additional letter „P“) or the factory type (for example: LDH70) in combination with subsequent serial numbers.

From the seemingly obvious rule there were many exceptions, for example the production by CKD of six-axle shunter locomotives, originally delivered for the Lenin Steelworks in Kraków, with the use of the designation starting from S-201. However the continuity of the designation was also maintained for locomotives built in the later period for other customers, which was a reason for duplication of numbers to some extent. In addition according to the rule accepted on the Czech railways, the sequence of the numbers was not associated with the first digit, and after the S-299 designation, it followed the S-2101 designation.

Foreign locomotive class type may nclude on of the designations:

- Railway authority class designation (for example: M62, 060DA, TEM2);
- PKP class type (for example: ST43, ST44);
- Type designation given by the manufacturer (for example: LDH70)

In these cases, each example in the series received its own serial number. Locomotives purchased abroad often have an unchanged designation or partially modified designation (for example: by removing the number of self-control or separated by a class and a link number), or a completely new digit. It's illogical to add a class type 231, 232, 233, 285 and 627 and 628 with the German abbreviations “BR” (German: Baureihe) and “VT” (German: Verbrennungstriebwagen) which did not appear in the German railways class type.

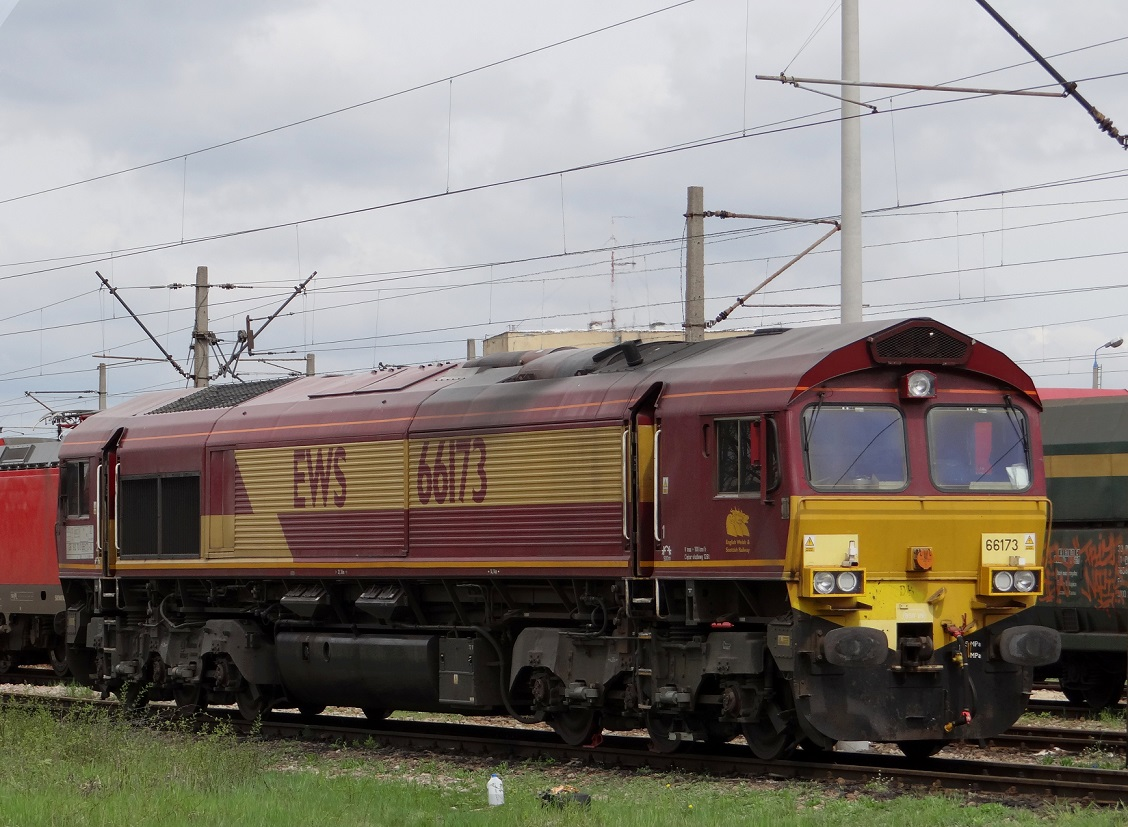
An example of a Class 66 locomotive having the kept designation: The locomotives serial number (66173) hasn't been changed after being bought by DB Schenker Rail Polska.

British locomotives Class 66 often have designation classified by the 1973 British Rail numbering and classification that remained in the Polish railways. The designation of the class 66 locomotives bought by Freightliner PL is changed by setting the original serial number from the start to the ongoing number, however the designation may be distinguished by the locomotive model, the JT42CWR models have an additional number 6 in the third digit of the class, while the JT42CWRM models do not have it (for example: 66411 as a JT42CWRM model was redesignated to 66013, 66624 as a JT42CWR model was redesignated to 66602). Class 66 locomotives bought by DB Schenker Rail Polska have originally kept designations from the British Railways that remained unchanged even when switching the locomotive's company (for example: 66180 kept its designation after being bought by DB Schenker, also kept when bought by Jaxan).

In some cases, the private owner doesn't use his own method of designating the rolling stock, only given the 12-digit EVN number.

=== Electric stock ===
==== Electric locomotives ====
===== 1959 classification =====
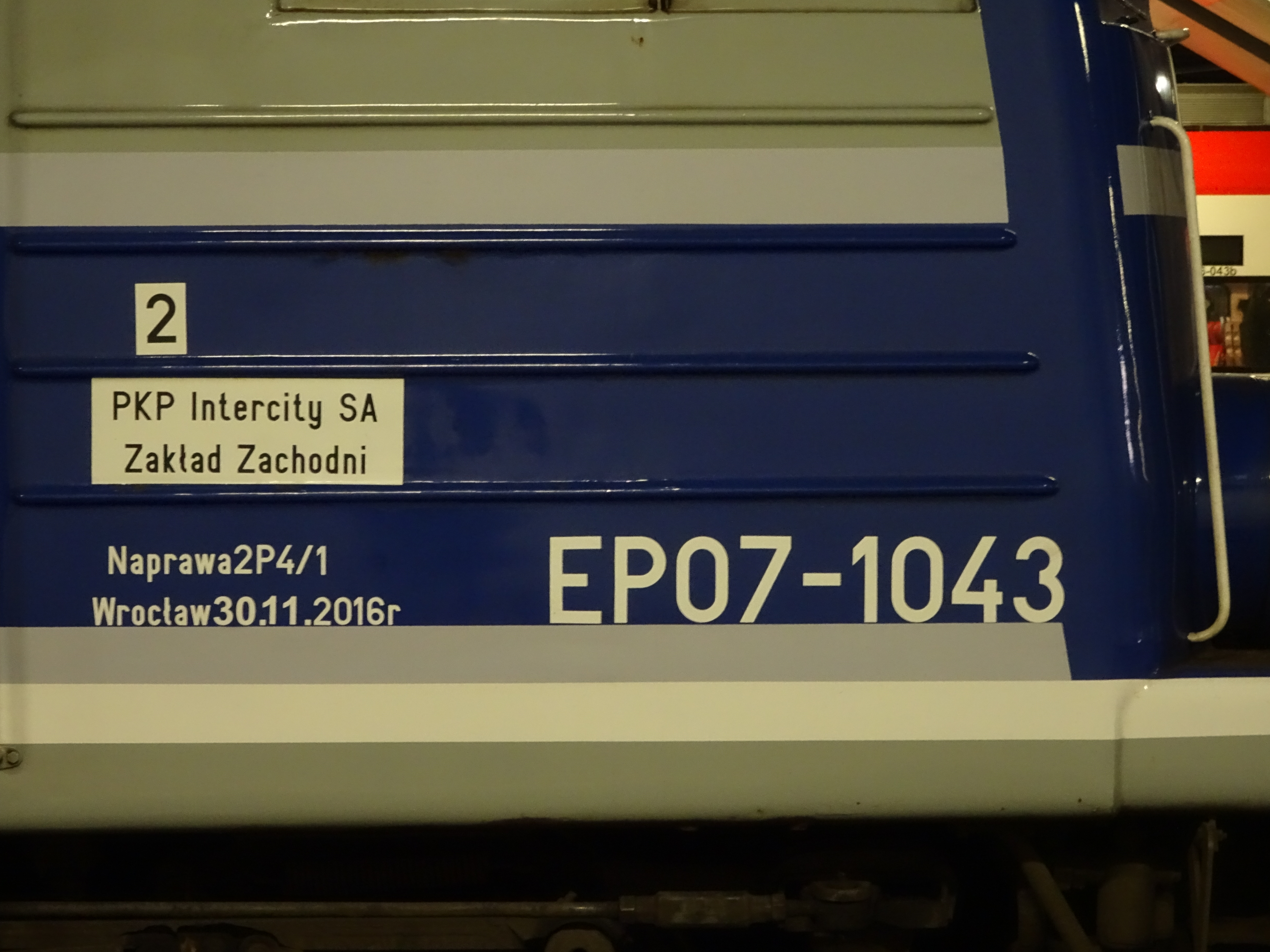
An example of an electric locomotive designation: (E) Electric, (P) Passenger traffic, (07) Bo-Bo axle arrangement, 3 kV DC electric system. Four numbers (1043) after a dash are the serial number.

In the post-war period, electric lokomotives from PKP had individual serial numbers grouped for each type, and from the mid 1950s received a simple class type consisting of the letter “E” and another number from “01” allocated separately for each type. It was a substitute for the classification system introduced in 1959 which consists of:

- The class type
- Serial number

Designation of the individual symbols in the class type

First digit – Traction type

- E – electric locomotive (Polish: Elektryczna)

Second digit – Intended traffic type

- P – passenger traffic (Polish: Pasażerska)
- T – freight traffic (Polish: Towarowa)
- U – mixed traffic (Polish: Uniwersalna)
- M – shunting traffic (Polish: Manewrowa)

Third and fourth digits – Design determination, axle arrangement, electric systems and order of entry into service

- 01 – 14 – four axles, Bo-Bo, direct current, 3 kV
- 15 – 19 – four axles, Bo-Bo, alternating current
- 20 – 34 – six axles, Co-Co, direct current, 3 kV
- 35 – 39 – six axles, Co-Co, alternating current
- 40 – 49 – other types

Fifth digit – Dash between the class type and the serial number

Digits after the dash – Serial number

In the original designation of the 1959 standard, it was developed at the time when the introduction of AC power supply with a frequency of 50 Hz was considered, the number ranges 15 – 19 and 35 – 39 were given for locomotives for alternating current.

The number range 40 - 49 used for the standard received two-unit locomotives (with ‘other axle system’, such as ET40) and Bo'Bo' locomotives adapted to operate on different power systems (with a ‘different voltage’ for example EU43).

In each group the individual designs were determined by numbers according to the order of entry into service (for example, in group 20 to 39,: EU20, ET21, ET22, EP23).

Locomotives with the same class received the next serial numbers starting from 01, when it was predicted a large number of examples, they received the serial numbers starting from 001. Separate ranges were highlighted by locomotives with the different design features, for example

- EU07 starting from 001 – 4E type
- EU07 starting from 301 – 303E type

In the later years, some locomotives were undergoing modernization, consisting of changing the gear ratio in order to obtain appropriate traction characteristics. Locomotives EU05 and EU07 received a new class type EP05 and EP07, keeping only the serial number.

===== Classification before 1939 =====
In order to classify the locomotives working in the Warsaw railway network, a similar system was adopted, consisting in designating locomotives with the symbol “EL” and with separate numbers, grouped for individual types of locomotives with the numbers starting from 101 and from 201. Built in 1939 but probably not yet accepted for service, “locomotives” created by the adaptation of railcars received numbering starting from 301.

==== Electric multiple units ====
===== 1959 classification =====
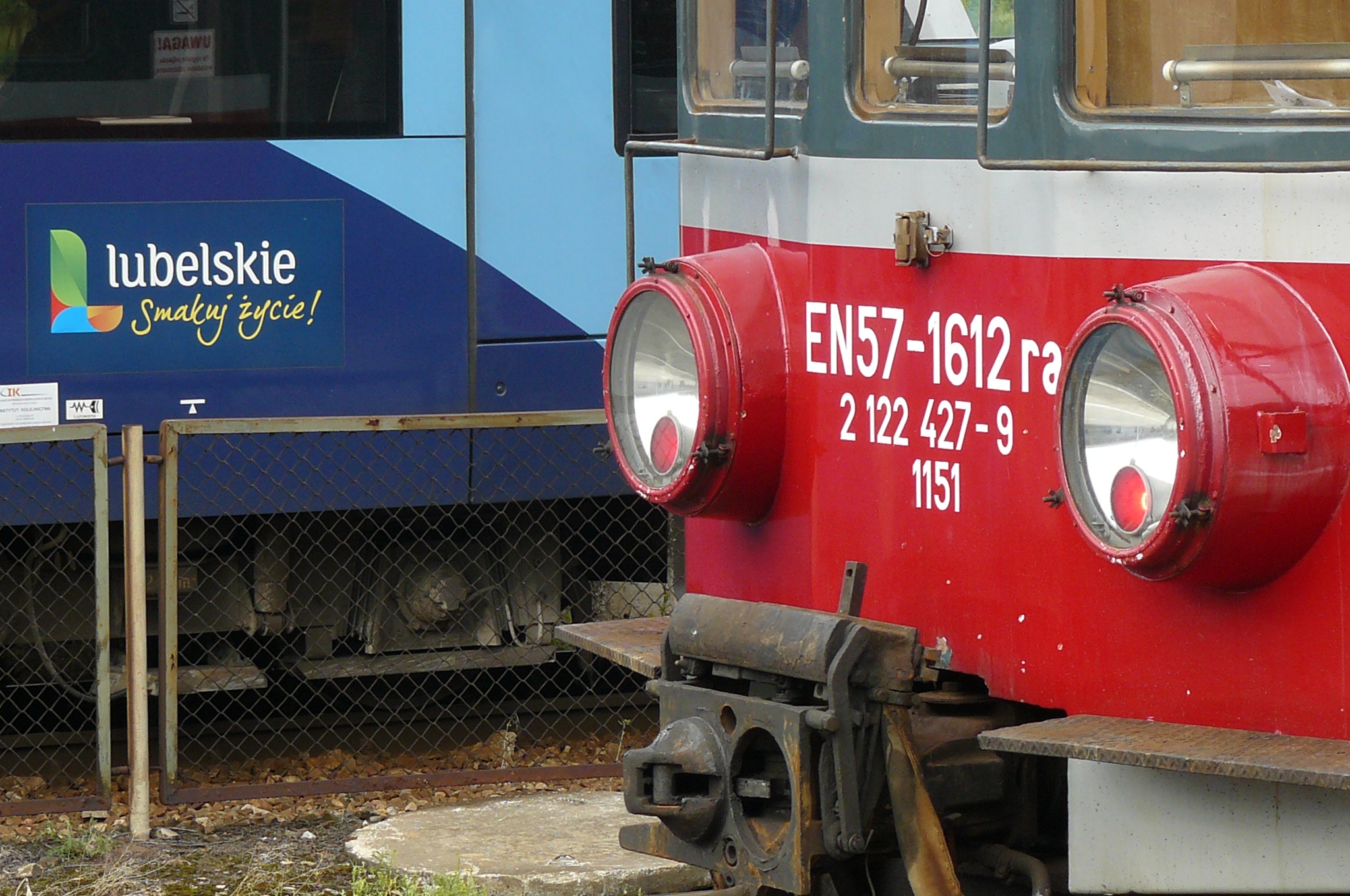
An example of an electric multiple unit designation (pictured left on the multiple unit): (E) Electric, (N) local and suburban traffic intended both for high and low platforms, (57) 3 car set, 3 kV DC, Four numbers (1612) after a dash are the serial number, next two letters after a serial number (ra) is a trailer cab with a driver's cab.

Electric multiple units were initially classified according to the system applicable for passenger wagons. After the war the electric railcar numbers were designated from 092 000, the passenger wagons from 093 000. The letter digits of the class containing basic information about the design features of the wagon was not related to the number.

During the transitional period, in the mid 1950s, 3 kV DC multiple units received a simplified class type consisting of the letter ‘E’ and another numbers from 51, assigned for each type of rolling stock with the class number designation still being used.

The electric multiple unit designation introduced in 1959 consist of

- The class type
- Serial number

Designation of the individual symbols in the class type

First digit – Traction type

- E – electric locomotive (Polish: Elektryczna)

Second digit – Intended traffic type

- R – suburban traffic (Polish: Podmiejski)
- W – suburban traffic intended only for high platforms (Polish: Węzłowa)
- N – local and suburban traffic intended both for high and low platforms (Polish: Normalna)
- D – long range traffic (Polish: Dalekobieżna)

Third and fourth digits – Number of cars in the multiple unit set and the electric systems

- 51 – 64 – 3 car set, 3 kV DC
- 65 – 69 – 3 car set, AC
- 70 – 74 – 4 car set, 3 kV DC
- 75 – 79 – 4 car set, AC
- 80 – 89 – single electric car, any voltage or type current
- 90 – 93 – 2 car set, 800 V DC
- 94 – 99 – other

Fifth digit – Dash between the class type and the serial number

Digits after the dash – Serial number

Two letter digits after the serial number – Determination of the type and order of the wagon in the multiple unit

- s – traction car
- r – trailer car with a driver's cab
- d – trailer car without a driver's cab

if there is more than one car of a given designation in a multiple unit, they are further identified with the letter 'a' or 'b'.

In the original designation of the 1959 standard, the number ranges 65 – 69 and 75 - 79 were reserved for three-car and four-car multiple units with alternating current.

The provisions contained in the standard did not provide for the introduction of designations for 3 kV multiple units with a different number of wagons than 3 or 4, and until the end of the 21st century a need did not exist.

In each group, individual designss were determined by numbers, according to the order of entry into service (for example, in group 70 to 79: ED70, EN71, ED72). The double-digit number could not be repeated when designating wagons for different operational purposes.

Multiple units with the same class received the next serial numbers starting from 01 or from 001. Similarly to locomotives, separate ranges were highlighted by multiple units with the different design features, for example:

- EN57 starting from 001 – basic class with 1st and 2nd class cars
- EN57 starting from 601 – multiple units with only 2nd class cars

===== Classification before 1939 =====
For the electric multiple units of the Warsaw railway network, separate groups of serial numbers were separated, and additional letter designations were introduced:

- m – railcar with a pantograph
- b – double wagon unit
- d – trailer car
- s – control car
- xx – 6 axle wagon

Warsaw railway network multiple unit numbering list:

- Railcar – 91 001 – 91 070, ECmx class
- Trailer car unit – 92 001 – 92 076, EBCbdxx/EBCbdsxx

==== Battery electric multiple units ====
The rules for designating railcars from PKP are set out in the Regulations on designating and numbering of M37 railcars. Railcars were designated according to the rules laid down for the passenger wagons for transporting passengers, with a large letter at the beginning of the class type specifying the power type:

- E – wagon with a battery electric engine

Subsequent digits were assigned in accordance with the rules applicable to ordinary passenger wagons. Large letters defined the type of travel class:

- B – 2nd class
- BC – 2nd/3rd class
- CD – 3rd/4th class

1st class compartments weren't applied to battery electric railcars.

Small letters aligned in the alphabetical order defined the design features:

- y – 3 axle railcar
- x – 4 axle railcar

4th class was only found in the former areas of the Prussian State Railways distribution, until the withdrawal in 1934, which involved keeping the rolling stock for the 3rd class railcars.

For the railcars including the battery electric stock, a group of numbers in the range of 90 000 to 90 499 has been designated without division into a division of a group of numbers for individual types of railcars. The designation was given according to the original allocation to the individual distributions.

Number designations for battery electric railcars:

- 90 012 – 90 025 – Poznań distribution
- 90 031 – 90 056 – Gdańsk distribution

Each wagon in a double wagon unit (essentially the ECB class wagons + EDy series wagons) had a separate number and the multiple units operated in fixed combinations.

==== Warsaw railway network rolling stock classification during the German occupation ====
The reactivation of electrical traction after the destruction from the battles of Warsaw in the years 1940 – 1941. Electric locomotives by PKP kept their designations, with the letter digit being shortened to one 'E' character. Electric multiple units had an additional two digit numbering, which was more practical than the original designation, different for individual wagons.

A new designation was given to electric multiple units:

- Starting from 401 – Railcar
- Starting from 501 – Trailer car unit

The multiple units from the Warsaw railway network found after the war often had kept both pre-war and war designations.

Railcars used in pairs as replacement locomotives had double two digit numbers starting from 41/42.

Locomotives imported from Italy in 1943 kept their original designation.

==== Electric locomotives and multiple units classification after 1945 ====
From the rules still applied to the M37 regulations, the designation digits were applied to railcars that entered service after the war:

- Ms – railcar with a diesel engine
- Ma – railcar with a battey electric engine
- E – electric railcar

The class designation and design features were given according to the existing rules, as before 1939.

In 1956 due to the withdrawal of the 1st class, the 1st class and 2nd class railcars were appropriately placed of 1st class and 2nd class railcars, which involved changing the class type, for example ECmx to EBmx, however without changing the serial number.

For the wagon rolling stock, new groups of six digit numbers with the first digit 0 was applied, which was distinguished from the pre-war designation, in which in the electric traction the number that preceded it was separated from the connector was the letter 'E', and for the traction wagons, was the letter 'EN':

- Starting from EN-092000 – Electric railcars
- Starting from E-093000 – Trailer car unit with a control cab
- Starting from E-094000 – Trailer car unit

In the later years, with the opening of electric traction in Tricity and the PKP’s acquisition of electric rolling stock of local railway lines, further number ranged were separated in the group of railcars (and similarly trailers car units):

- Starting from 092600 – 800 V rolling stock
- Starting from 092700 – rolling stock from the remained railways (WKD, Walim railway, Wąbrzeźno railway)

Since about 1955, the newly built or rebuilt rolling stock have received a new class type consisting of the letter E and a two digit number along with another serial number (from 01). In practice older electric multiple unitss were still labeled according to old rules, with the first digit '0' being discontinued at the end of the decade (for example, EN-92101), still using the class type digit (in this case EBMx).

Changes of designating electric locomotives from PKP
Primary serial numbers	Class designation		Notes
Primary serial numbers	temporary	next	Notes
E106	E01	EP01	
E110-117	E02	EP02	
E150-157	E03	EP03	
E201-202	E04	EU04	
(E400)*	E05	EU20	
(E500)*	E06	ET21	
401	E40	EU40*	Walim railway
No. 4	E41	EU41*	Wąbrzeźno railway
* – Designation that was never applied

Changes of designating electric multiple units from PKP
Primary serial numbers**		Class designation		Notes
Traction	Trailer unit	temporary	next	Notes
EN-092000	E-093000	E51	EW51	
EN-092040	E-093040	E52	EW52	
EN-092050	E-093050	E53	EW53	
EN-092100	E-093100	E54	EW52	
EN-092300	E-092350	E56	EN56	
92400*		E58	ED70	
EN-092600		E90	EW90	
-	-	E91	EW91	
EN-92799	E-93799, E-94799	E93	-	Walim railway
EN-92700	E-94700	E94	EN80	WKD
No. 1, 2, 3	-	E95	EN81*	Wąbrzeźno railway
* – Designation that was never applied
** – The table indicates the general (outside the Walim railway) range of numbers; in fact, the numbering ran from 0 or from 1

With the introduction of new class types (for example ET21 in place of E06) the previous serial numbering was continued, and in the previously delivered rolling stock the series designation was changed during the periodic repairs.

==== Classification different from the rules by PKP ====
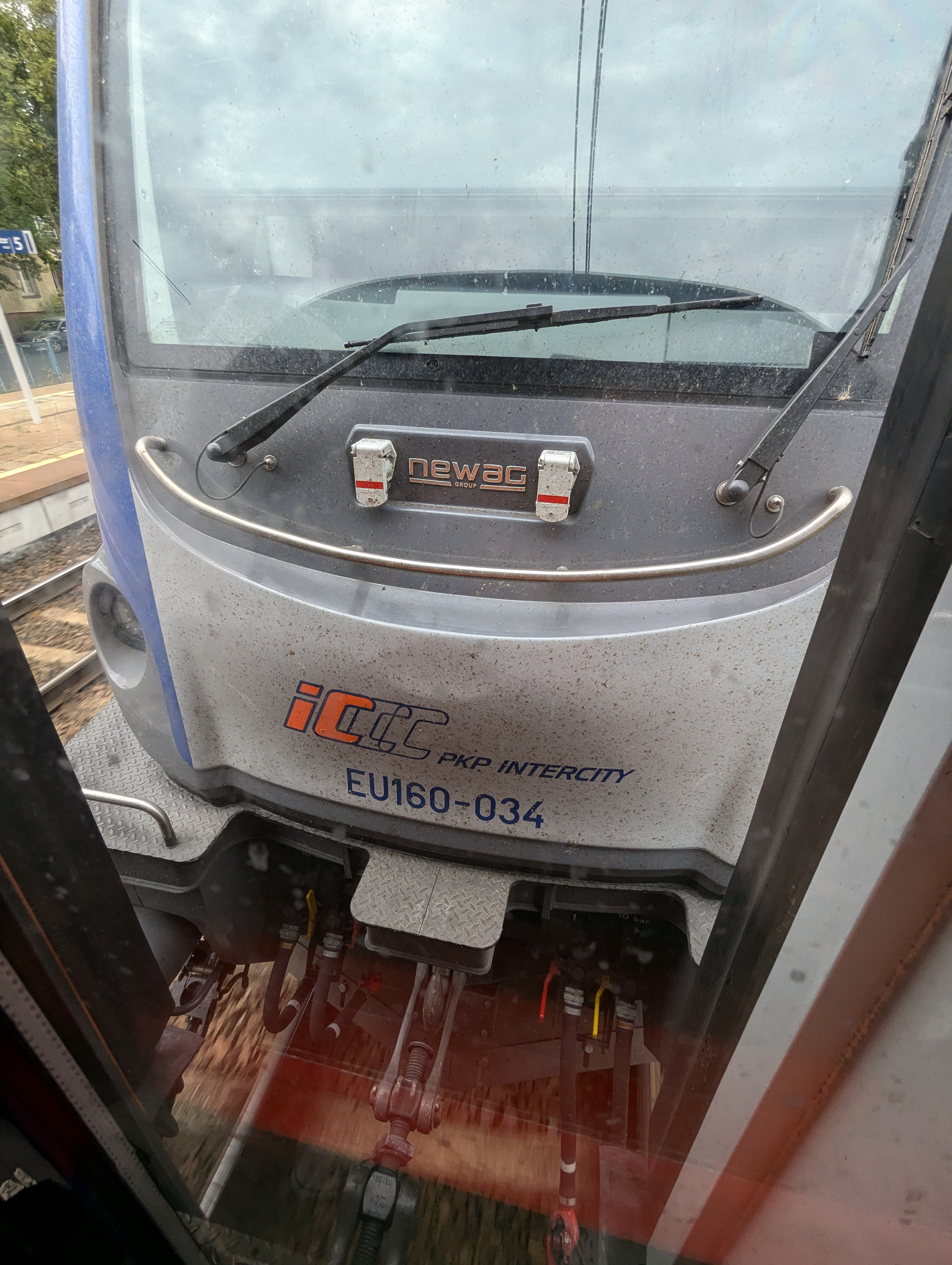
An example of a designation of the locomotive owned by PKP Intercity: The designation (EU160) only represents the locomotive's maximum speed rather than the axle arrangement and electric system type.

Unlike companies originating from PKP's business, where until recently uniform rules for designating and numbering of traction rolling stock were in force, other carriers use different methods of rolling stock designation, most often not by re-creating their own rules, but by using the already existing assessment of rolling stock. For a number of years, the unwritten rule remained the separation of the class type and the serial number.

In addition to designation according to the rules adopted for PKP, the following methods of designating rolling stock can be found below:

- Rolling stock design type symbol is connected with the next built stock number (for example: 111Db, 27WE)
- Locomotives originating from Czech and Slovak railways have originally kept designations, even with assigning in Poland a new EVN number; in the number class designation the first number '1' describes the direct current electric locomotive.
- Locomotives originating from Germany (Purchase or leasing) have original class type given by the manufacturer, in accordance with the rules in force of the country, it is often preceded with an 'E' symbol.
- The class type from the locomotives and multiple units from PKP Intercity creates an 'ED' or 'EU' symbol and a three digit number describing the rolling stock's maximum speed (for example: EU160, EU200, ED160, ED250).

In some cases, the owner does not use its own method of designating the rolling stock, instead relying only on the designation of the 12 digit EVN number.

Industrial railway locomotives had a separate numbering, given without a class type. In the case of sand railways (PMPPW), the numbers were assigned consecutively for each type: 1 to 9 (2E), 10 to 23 (3E), and from 24 (3E/1).

Electric locomotives from the former PKP park, and currently operated by various carriers, are designated in various ways: the original PKP designation (most often), a class type or series of PKP signs combined with another number, numbering given by the new owner, or with a factory number.

== Steam stock ==
=== Steam locomotives ===
==== First locomotives of Poland ====
Locomotive	Image	Railway	Whyte	Manufacturer	Build date	Quantity used	Years withdrawn	Notes
Warszawa		Warsaw-Vienna Railway	0-4-2	Cockerill	1840	2	1863	
Rawka		Warsaw-Vienna Railway	2-2-2	Cockerill	1840	3	1863	
Jan		Warsaw-Vienna Railway	2-2-2	Sharp & Roberts	1845	5		
		Warsaw-Vienna Railway	2-4-0	Sharp & Roberts	1856	19	1888	
		Warsaw-Vienna Railway	2-2-2	Borsig				
Kraków		Cracow-Upper Silesian Railway	2-2-2	Borsig	1847	4	1869	
Podgórze		Cracow-Upper Silesian Railway	2-4-0	Borsig	1847	2	1863	
Przemyśl		Cracow-Upper Silesian Railway	2-4-0	Borsig	1849	2	1869	
Góral		Tarnów-Leluchów railway, Galician Transversal Railway	0-4-2	Beyer, Peacock & Company	1856	2	1890s	

==== Express locomotives ====
===== Locomotives of German origin =====
Locomotive class	Locomotive origin		Image	Whyte	Manufacturer	Standard gauge (1435 mm)		Russian gauge (1520 mm)		Years withdrawn	Notes
Locomotive class	Locomotive origin		Image	Whyte	Manufacturer	Build date	Quantity used	Build date	Quantity used	Years withdrawn	Notes
Pc1	Prussian S 1			2-4-0	Hanomag Henschel & Son	1890-1895	14			1920s	
Pd1	Prussian S 3			4-4-0	Breslau Henschel & Son Humboldt	1892–1907	18	1892–1905	89 + 3 Dz	to 1951	
Pd3	Prussian S 5	S 5^{1}		4-4-0	Henschel & Son	1903	1				
Pd4	Prussian S 5	S 52		4-4-0	Schichau Vulcan Stettin	1905–1910	14	1906–1911	29	to 1955	
Pf1	Prussian S 7			4-4-2				1904–1906	7	Before 1936	Hanomag version
Pf2	Prussian S 7			4-4-2				1905	3	Before 1937	Grafenstaden version
Pd2	Prussian S 4			4-4-0	Henschel & Son Borsig			1906	6	1939	
Pd5	Prussian S 6			4-4-0	Breslau Henschel & Son Humboldt	1907–1913	37	1906–1913	79 + 2 Dz	to 1958	
	REL class S12			4-6-2	Elsassische Maschinenbau-Gesellschaft Grafenstaden	1909	1			1946	
Pk1	Prussian S 10	S 10		4-6-0	Schwartzkopff Vulcan Stettin Hanomag	1911–1914	24	1911–1914	31	to 1958	
Pk2	Prussian S 10	S 10^{1}		4-6-0	Henschel & Son Breslau	1911–1915	42	1911–1916	20	to 1958	
Pk3	Prussian S 10	S 10^{2}		4-6-0	Vulcan Stettin			1914	1	1939	
Pt1	Prussian P 10			2-8-2	Borsig Henschel & Son	1923–1925	11			1956	Returned to DR after the retirement
Pm2	DRG Class 03			4-6-2	Borsig Schwartzkopff Krupp Henschel & Son	1931–1936	35			1970s	
Pm3	DRB Class 03^{10}			4-6-2	Borsig Krupp Krauss Maffei	1939–1940	9			1966	

===== Locomotives of Austrian Origin =====
Locomotive class	Locomotive origin		Image	Whyte	Manufacturer	Standard gauge (1435 mm)		Russian gauge (1520 mm)		Years withdrawn	Notes
Locomotive class	Locomotive origin		Image	Whyte	Manufacturer	Build date	Quantity used	Build date	Quantity used	Years withdrawn	Notes
Pd11	kkStB 104			4-4-0	Wiener Neustadt Krauss Linz	1884-1887	6			1920s	
Pd12	kkStB 6			4-4-0	Floridsdorf Wiener Neustadt StEG	1894-1898	9				
Pf11	kkStB 108			4-4-2	StEG	1903	1			Late 1940s	
Pf12	kkStB 308			4-4-2	Wiener Neustadt	1895–1905	9				
Pd13	kkStB 106			4-4-0	Floridsdorf Wiener Neustadt StEG	1898–1902	8				
Pd14	kkStB 206			4-4-0	Floridsdorf Wiener Neustadt StEG BMMF	1903–1907	11		2	Late 1940s	
Pn11	Gölsdorf Adriatics	kkStB 210		2-6-4	Floridsdorf BMMF	1910	9		9		
Pn12	Gölsdorf Adriatics	kkStB 310		2-6-4	Floridsdorf Wiener Neustadt StEG BMMF Breitfeld und Danek	1911–1918	7		22		

===== Locomotives of other origin =====
Locomotive class	Locomotive origin	Image	Whyte	Country of origin	Manufacturer	Standard gauge (1435 mm)		Russian gauge (1520 mm)		Years withdrawn	Notes
Locomotive class	Locomotive origin	Image	Whyte	Country of origin	Manufacturer	Build date	Quantity used	Build date	Quantity used	Years withdrawn	Notes
Pe101	SNCB/NMBS class 12		2-4-2	Belgium	Cockerill Tubize	1890-1894	3			Before 1927	

===== Locomotives built in Poland =====
Locomotive class		Image	Whyte	Manufacturer	Standard gauge (1435 mm)		Russian gauge (1520 mm)		Years withdrawn	Notes
Locomotive class		Image	Whyte	Manufacturer	Build date	Quantity used	Build date	Quantity used	Years withdrawn	Notes
Pu29			4-8-2	H. Cegielski	1931	1	1931	3	1970	
Pt31			2-8-2	Fablok	1932–1940	66		98	1970s	
Pm36	Pm36-1		4-6-2	Fablok	1937	1			1945	
Pm36	Pm36-2		4-6-2	Fablok	1937	1			1966	
Pt47			2-8-2	Fablok H. Cegielski	1948–1951	180			1980s	

==== Passenger locomotives ====
===== Locomotives of German origin =====
Locomotive class	Locomotive origin		Image	Whyte	Manufacturer	Standard gauge (1435 mm)		Russian gauge (1520 mm)		Years withdrawn	Notes
Locomotive class	Locomotive origin		Image	Whyte	Manufacturer	Build date	Quantity used	Build date	Quantity used	Years withdrawn	Notes
Oc1	Prussian P 3	P 3^{1}		2-4-0	Henschel & Son Linke-Hoffman Werke			1887-1895	13	Before 1936	
Oc2	Prussian P 3	P 3^{2}		2-4-0	Borsig			1882-1885	7	1930s	
Od1	Prussian P 4^{1}	P 4^{1}		4-4-0	Henschel & Son			1893–1900	21	1927–1936	
Od2	Prussian P 4^{1}	P 4^{2}		4-4-0	Henshcel & Son Humboldt etc.	1898–1910	46		94 + 3 Dz	1950s	
Od101	Saxon VIII V2			4-4-0	Hartmann			1897	1	Before 1931	
Od102	Württemberg AD			4-4-0	Esslingen			1907	1	Before 1931	
Ok101	Baden IV e			4-6-0	Grafenstaden MBG Karlsruhe	1895 1898	2			1924–1926	
Ok102	Württemberg D			4-6-0	Esselingen	1898–1905	4			1920s	
Ok103	Bavarian S 3/5			4-6-0	Maffei	1907	1				
Om101	Württemberg C			4-6-2	Esselingen	1911	1			1945	
Oi1	Prussian P 6			2-6-0	Hanomag Schwartzkopff Humboldt Henschel & Son	1905–1910	31	1905–1909	44	to 1972	
Oi2	DRG Class 24			2-6-0	Schichau Krupp Breslau	1928–1940	34			1976	
Ok1	Prussian P 8			4-6-0	Schwartzkopff Linke-Hoffman Borsig etc.	1906–1923	429	1908–1923	255 + 2 Dz	1981	
Ok2	Saxon XII H2			4-6-0	Hartmann	1910–1922	5			early 1950s	
Ot1	DRG Class 41			2-8-2	Schwartzkopff Borsig etc.	1939–1940	19			early 1970s	

===== Locomotives of Austrian origin =====
Locomotive class	Locomotive origin	Image	Whyte	Manufacturer	Standard gauge (1435 mm)		Russian gauge (1520 mm)		Years withdrawn	Notes
Locomotive class	Locomotive origin	Image	Whyte	Manufacturer	Build date	Quantity used	Build date	Quantity used	Years withdrawn	Notes
Oc11	KFNB IIIb1		2-4-0	StEG	1867-1873	6			early 1920s	
Oc12	kkStB 24		2-4-0	Sigl Wiener Neustadt	1870 1872	2			before 1927	
Oc13	kkStB 19		2-4-0	Wiener Neustadt	1870-1872	4			before 1926	
Oc14	kkStB 207		2-4-0	StEG	1880	4			1920s	
Oc15	kkStB 122		2-4-0	Wiener Neustadt	1882	2			before 1927	
Oc16	kkStB 25		2-4-0	StEG	1884	7			before 1927	
Oc17	CLB IIg		2-4-0	StEG	1885	2			1920s	
Od11	kkStB 1		4-4-0	Wiener Neustadt	1883	1			1920s	
Od12	kkStB 2		4-4-0	Wiener Neustadt	1884-1885	8			1920s	
Od13	kkStB 4		4-4-0	Wiener Neustadt Krauss Floridsdorf StEG	1885-1897	29			1920s–1930s	
Od14	kkStB 104		4-4-0	Wiener Neustadt Krauss Floridsdorf	1884-1893	7			1920s	
Oi101	kukHB 328		2-6-0	BMAG Tubize	1912–1916	20			1960s	
Ol11	kkStB 329		2-6-2	Floridsdorf Wiener Neustadt StEG BMMF	1908–1909	11		21	1950s	
Ol12	kkStB 429		2-6-2	Floridsdorf Wiener Neustadt StEG	1909–1918	47		106	1960s	

===== Locomotives of other origin =====
Locomotive class	Locomotive origin	Image	Whyte	Country of origin	Manufacturer	Standard gauge (1435 mm)		Russian gauge (1520 mm)		Years withdrawn	Notes
Locomotive class	Locomotive origin	Image	Whyte	Country of origin	Manufacturer	Build date	Quantity used	Build date	Quantity used	Years withdrawn	Notes
Od103	SBB 114		4-4-0	Switzerland	Winterthur	1893–1903	5			1920s	
Oi102	Russian locomotive class N		2-6-0	Russian Empire				1903–1909	7	early 1930s	
Ol103	MAV Class 324		2-6-2	Hungary	MAVAG	1915–1916	4			1950s	Originally classified as Tl103
Os424	MAV Class 424		4-8-0	Hungary	MAVAG	1924 1941 1944	3			1960s	

===== Locomotives built in Poland =====
Locomotive class	Image	Whyte	Manufacturer	Standard gauge (1435 mm)		Russian gauge (1520 mm)		Years withdrawn	Notes
Locomotive class	Image	Whyte	Manufacturer	Build date	Quantity used	Build date	Quantity used	Years withdrawn	Notes
Ok22		4-6-2	Hanomag Fablok	1923–1934	91		190	1970s	
Ok203		4-6-2	ZNTK Piła	1952–1955	2			1976–1977	Ok22 rebuild
Ok55-3		4-6-2	ZNTK Wrocław	1959	1			1977	
Ol49		2-6-2	Fablok	1951–1954	112			1980s–1990s	
Os24		4-8-0	Fablok	1926–1927	15	1926–1927	60	1960s	

==== Freight locomotives ====
===== Locomotives of German origin =====
Locomotive class	Locomotive origin		Image	Whyte	Manufacturer	Standard gauge (1435 mm)		Russian gauge (1520 mm)		Years withdrawn	Notes
Locomotive class	Locomotive origin		Image	Whyte	Manufacturer	Build date	Quantity used	Build date	Quantity used	Years withdrawn	Notes
Tb1	Prussian G 1			0-4-0	Schichau, Henschel & Son	1896	3	1895	1 Dz	before 1927	
Th1	Prussian G 3			0-6-0	Hanomag, Henschel & Son, etc.			1880-1895	118	until 1939	
Th2	Prussian G 4	G 4^{1}		0-6-0	Union Giesserei			1883-1898	8	to 1936	
Th3	Prussian G 4	G 4^{2}		0-6-0	Hanomag, Henschel & Son, etc.	1899	1	1887–1900	103 + 8 Dz	1936–1948	
Th4	Prussian G 4	G 4^{3}		0-6-0	Union Giesserei			1905–1907	10 + 5 Dz	until 1939	
Th101	Saxon V V			0-6-0	Hartmann, Sigl			1887–1900	9	to 1936	
Th102	Württemburg Fc			0-6-0	Esslingen			1890–1909	19	before 1936	
Th103	Baden VIId			0-6-0	MBG			1896	1	1926–1927	
Ti1	Prussian G 5	G 5^{1}		2-6-0	Vuclan Stettin			1893–1901	28	until 1939	
Ti2	Prussian G 5	G 5^{2}		2-6-0	Various, including Schichau	1899–1906	6	1897–1908	74	mid 1930s – 1954	
Ti3	Prussian G 5	G 5^{3}		2-6-0	Humboldt, Hohenzollern, etc.	1904	1	1903–1905	16	to 1952	
Ti4	Prussian G 5	G 5^{4}		2-6-0	Schwartzkopff, Henschel & Son, Borsig, etc.	1899–1910	60	1901–1910	195 + 2 Dz	to 1957	
Ti102	Prussian G 5	G 5^{Rm}		2-6-0	Henschel & Son, Jung			1910–1914	4	1939	
Ti101	Bavarian C VI, Bavarian G 3/4 N			2-6-0	Krauss			1900–1909	10	before 1936	
Tp1	Prussian G 7	G 7^{1}		0-8-0	Schwartzkopff, Vulcan Stettin, Henschel & Son, etc.	1898–1917	99	1894–1917	142	1960s	
Tp2	Prussian G 7	G 7^{2}		0-8-0	Hanomag, Vulcan Stettin, Henschel & Son, etc.	1895–1911	91	1895–1911	295	1960s	
Tr1	Prussian G 7	G 7^{3}		2-8-0	Hanomag, Maffei, etc.			1893–1917	23		
Tp3	Prussian G 8	G 8		0-8-0	Vulcan Stettin, Schichau, Hanomag, etc.	1906–1913	45	1905–1913	83	1960s	
Tp4	Prussian G 8	G 8^{1}		0-8-0	Hanomag, Schichau, Breslau, etc.	1913–1921	302	1913–1922	459 + 3 Dz	1960s–1972	
Tr6	Prussian G 8	G 8^{2}		2-8-0	Henschel & Son, Borsig, Krupp, etc.	1920–1924	52			early 1950s	
Tr3	Prussian G 8	G 8^{3}		2-8-0	Henschel & Son	1920	16			early 1950s	
Tp5	Prussian G 9	Standard G 9		0-8-0	Schichau, Hanomag			1909–1911	7	to 1939	
Tp8	Prussian G 9	Mallet G 9		0-4-4-0	Grafenstaden	1893-1898	2			before 1927	
Tp6	WWB 401-441			0-8-0	Hanomag			from 1895	8	to 1939	
Tp7				0-8-0	Hanomag			from 1895	2	to 1939	
Tp106	kukHB 274			0-8-0	Henschel & Son			1916	26	1960s	
Tr5	DR Class 56	Class 56^{2-8}		2-8-0	DRG workshops	1936–1941	66			1960s–1972	Prussian G 8^{1} rebuild
Tr7	DR Class 56	Class 56^{41}		2-8-0	MBA	1941	4			1964–1972	
Tr101	Bavarian E I			2-8-0	Krauss	1901	1			before 1936	
Tr102	Bavarian G 4/5 N			2-8-0	Krauss	1906	2			before 1936	
Tr104				2-8-0	Henschel & Son	1916–1917	31			late 1930s	
Tr105	kkStB 170			2-8-0	Hartmann	1902–1906	4			before 1927	
Tr106	SaSt 771 – 800			2-8-0	Hartmann	1907–1908	5			before 1927	
Tw1	Prussian G 10, kukHB 680			0-10-0	Henshcel & Son, Borsig, Hanomag, Schwartzkopff	1910–1924	141	1911–1922	85	1970s	
Ty1	Prussian G 12, Saxon XIII H			0-10-0	Borsig, Henschel & Son, etc.	1918–1922	134	1918	1	1960s–1970	
Ty2	DRB class 52			0-10-0	Henschel & Son, Schwartzkopff, Borsig, etc.	1942–1945	1407			1980s–1990s	
Ty3	DRB class 42			0-10-0	Schichau, Esslingen	1944	3			2002	reclassified to Ty43
Ty4	DRG Class 44			0-10-0	Henschel & Son, Borsig, Krupp, etc.	1937–1944	132			1970s	
Ty5	DRG Class 50			0-10-0	Henschel & Son, Schwartzkopff, Krupp, etc.	1939–1944	55			1970s	

===== Locomotives of Austrian origin =====
Locomotive class	Locomotive origin	Image	Whyte	Manufacturer	Standard gauge (1435 mm)		Russian gauge (1520 mm)		Years withdrawn	Notes
Locomotive class	Locomotive origin	Image	Whyte	Manufacturer	Build date	Quantity used	Build date	Quantity used	Years withdrawn	Notes
Th11	kkStB 32		0-6-0	StEG	1875	6			before 1926	
Th12	kkStB 36		0-6-0	Sigl	1872	1				
Th13			0-6-0	Wiener Neustadt	1868-1873	9			before 1924	
Th14	kkStB 38		0-6-0	StEG	1868-1878	20			1919–1926	
Th15	kkStB 50		0-6-0	WLF	1883	2			1940	
Th16	kkStB 51		0-6-0	StEG, Wiener Neustadt, Floridsdorf			1871-1889	39	1920–1931	
Th17	kkStB 54		0-6-0	StEG, Wiener Neustadt, Borsig	1872-1885	55			before 1924	
Th18			0-6-0	Sigl			1872-1889	20	before 1927	
Th19	kkStB 47		0-6-0	Wiener Neustadt	1867-1884	4			before 1924	
Th20	kkStB 56		0-6-0	Floridsdorf, Wiener Neustadt, StEG			1888–1900	56	1931–1936	
Th21	Vc1 Vc2		0-6-0	StEG	1865-1870	9			until 1924	
Th22	kkStB 53		0-6-0	Sigl, Wiener Neustadt, StEG	1872-1882	6			before 1925	
Th23	kkStB 55, kkStB 155		0-6-0	WLF	1889-1899	10			before 1927	
Th24	kkStB 59		0-6-0	All Austrian locomotive manufacturers	1893–1903	8		80	1920s – 1951	
Ti11	KFNB Class VIII		2-6-0	Wiener Neustadt, Floridsdorf, BMM	1893–1908	63			1924–1953	
Ti12	kkStB 60		2-6-0	All Austrian locomotive manufacturers			1897–1910	158	to 1951	
Ti16	kkStB 160		2-6-0	Floridsdorf			1909–1910	42	to 1950	
Ti17	kukHB 860		2-6-0	Floridsdorf			1916	3	until 1939	
Tp11	kkStB 571		0-8-0	StEG	1868 1878	2			before 1927 until 1939	
Tp12	kkStB 171		0-8-0	Sigl, Wiener Neustadt, etc.	1873-1883	11				
Tp13	kkStB 70		0-8-0	Floridsdorf, Wiener Neustadt, etc.			1873-1875	11	until 1939	
Tp14			0-8-0	Wiener Neustadt	1881	1			before 1926	
Tp15	kkStB 73		0-8-0	All Austrian locomotive manufacturers			1885–1909	233	until 1939	
Tp17	kkStB 174		0-8-0	Floridsdorf	1906–1914	19			until 1939	
Tr11	kkStB 170		2-8-0	All Austrian locomotive manufacturers	1898–1918	72		145	to 1955	
Tr12	kkStB 270		2-8-0	Floridsdorf, WSABP	1920–1927	38		142	1960s	
Tw11	kkStB 180		0-10-0	Floridsdorf, Wiener Neustadt, StEG, BMMF	1900–1909	11			until 1939	
Tw12	kkStB 80		0-10-0	Floridsdorf, Wiener Neustadt, StEG	1915–1923	57		140	1960s	

===== Locomotives of other origin =====
Locomotive class	Locomotive origin		Image	Whyte	Country of origin	Manufacturer	Standard gauge (1435 mm)		Russian gauge (1520 mm)		Years withdrawn	Notes
Locomotive class	Locomotive origin		Image	Whyte	Country of origin	Manufacturer	Build date	Quantity used	Build date	Quantity used	Years withdrawn	Notes
Ti103				2-6-0	Switzerland	Winterthur	1885-1890	2			before 1931	
Tp102	Russian locomotive class O	O^{D}		0-8-0	Russian Empire	Kolomna Locomotive Works, Bryansk Machine-Building Plant, Malyshev Factory, etc.			1897–1901	17	1930s	
Tp104	Russian locomotive class O	O^{v}		0-8-0	Russian Empire	Kolomna Locomotive Works, Bryansk Machine-Building Plant, etc.			1901–1928	94		
Tp108	WWB Cz W/h			0-8-0	Russian Empire	Malyshev Factory			1904–1909	14		
Tp109				0-8-0	Russian Empire	Kolomna Locomotive Works, Malyshev Factory		1	1909–1912	5	until 1939	
Tp110	ChVP			0-8-0	Russian Empire	Kolomna Locomotive Works			1914	1	before 1936	
Tr103	ShCh			2-8-0	Russian Empire	Malyshev Factory, Bryansk Machine-Building Plant			1906–1918	28		
Tr20	no origin			2-8-0	United States of America	Baldwin Locomotive Works	1919–1923	100		175	early 1970s	
Tr201	USATC S160			2-8-0	United States of America	Baldwin Locomotive Works, American Locomotive Company, Lima Locomotives Works	1944–1945	75			1970s	
Tr203	USATC S160			2-8-0	United States of America	Baldwin Locomotive Works, American Locomotive Company, Lima Locomotives Works	1942–1945	500			1970s	
Tr202	no origin			2-8-0	Great Britain	Vulcan Foundry	1946	30			1970s	
Ty246	no origin			2-10-0	United States of America	American Locomotive Company, Baldwin Locomotive Works, Lima Locomotives Works	1947	100			1970s	

===== Locomotives built in Poland =====
Locomotive class	Image	Whyte	Manufacturer	Standard gauge (1435 mm)		Russian gauge (1520 mm)		Years withdrawn	Notes
Locomotive class	Image	Whyte	Manufacturer	Build date	Quantity used	Build date	Quantity used	Years withdrawn	Notes
Tr21		2-8-0	StEG, HStP, Tubze, Fablok	1922–1925	104		148	1960s–1970s	
Ty23		2-10-0	H. Cegielski, WSABP, Fablok, etc.	1923–1934	612		312	1970s–1980s	
Ty37		2-10-0	H. Cegielski	1937–1941	21		27	1970s	
Ty45		2-10-0	Fablok, H. Cegielski	1946–1951	428			1980s–1990s	
Ty42		2-10-0	Fablok, H. Cegielski	1945–1946	150			1980s–1990s	
Ty43		2-10-0	H. Cegielski	1946–1949	129			1980s	
Ty51		2-10-0	H. Cegielski	1953–1958	212			1980s–1990s	

=== Steam Tank Locomotives ===
==== Passenger Locomotives ====
===== Locomotives of German Origin =====
Locomotive class	Locomotive origin		Image	Whyte	Manufacturer	Standard gauge (1435 mm)		Russian gauge (1520 mm)		Years withdrawn	Notes
Locomotive class	Locomotive origin		Image	Whyte	Manufacturer	Build date	Quantity used	Build date	Quantity used	Years withdrawn	Notes
OKc1	Prussian T 4			2-4-0T	Henschel & Son	1893	2			1927, 1963	
OKe1	Prussian T 5	T 5^{1}		2-4-2T	Henschel & Son	1897–1904	5			until 1939	
OKd1	Prussian T 5	T 5^{2}		4-4-0T	Grafenstaden	1899	1			before 1931	
OKi1	Prussian T 11			2-6-0T	Union Giesserei, Borsig, Hohenzollern, Vulcan Stettin	1903–1910	52	1903–1908	52 + 4 Dz	1960s	
OKi2	Prussian T 12			2-6-0T	Borsig, Grafenstaden, Hohenzollern	1906–1921	84	1907–1916	12 + 6 Dz	1960s–1971	
OKl1	Prussian T 6			2-6-2T	Schwartzkopff			1902	5	to 1937	
OKl2	DRB Class 64			2-6-2T	Union Giesserei, Vulcan Stettin, Schichau, etc.	1928–1940	38			1960s–1973	
OKl100				2-6-2T	Henschel & Son	1936	1			1960s	
OKl101	Saxon XIV HT			2-6-2T	Hartmann	1911–1917	11			1960s	
OKo1	Prussian T 18			4-6-4T	Vulcan Stettin, Franco-Belge	1916–1925	29			early 1970s	

===== Locomotives of Austrian origin =====
Locomotive class	Locomotive origin	Image	Whyte	Manufacturer	Standard gauge (1435 mm)		Russian gauge (1520 mm)		Years withdrawn	Notes
Locomotive class	Locomotive origin	Image	Whyte	Manufacturer	Build date	Quantity used	Build date	Quantity used	Years withdrawn	Notes
OKl11	kkStB 29		2-6-2T	BMMF, Floridsdorf	1912	9			Late 1950s–1961	
OKl12	kkStB 229		2-6-2T	All Austrian locomotive manufacturers	1902–1917	12		22	1960s	
OKm11	BBÖ 629		4-6-2T	Krauss-Linz	1922	5	1922	10	1953–1954	

===== Locomotives of other origin =====
Locomotive class	Locomotive origin	Image	Whyte	Country of origin	Manufacturer	Standard gauge (1435 mm)		Russian gauge (1520 mm)		Years withdrawn	Notes
Locomotive class	Locomotive origin	Image	Whyte	Country of origin	Manufacturer	Build date	Quantity used	Build date	Quantity used	Years withdrawn	Notes
OKa1	LVD Class Tk		2-2-2T	Lithuania	Krupp, Daugavpils	1931–1933	2			1957, 1969	1 example reclassified to TKa-242
OKf100	LVD Class Tk		2-4-4T	Czechoslovakia	Skoda Works	1932	1			1950	
OKh10	LMS Fowler class 3F		0-6-0T	Great Britain	William Beardmore & Co.						

===== Locomotives built in Poland =====
Locomotive class	Image	Whyte	Manufacturer	Standard gauge (1435 mm)		Russian gauge (1520 mm)		Years withdrawn	Notes
Locomotive class	Image	Whyte	Manufacturer	Build date	Quantity used	Build date	Quantity used	Years withdrawn	Notes
OKl27		2-6-2T	H. Cegielski	1928–1933	95		122	1970s–1985	
OKz32		2-10-2T	H. Cegielski	1934–1936	11		25	1971–1974	

==== Freight Locomotives ====
===== Locomotives of German Origin =====
Locomotive class	Locomotive origin		Image	Whyte	Manufacturer	Standard gauge (1435 mm)		Russian gauge (1520 mm)		Years withdrawn	Notes
Locomotive class	Locomotive origin		Image	Whyte	Manufacturer	Build date	Quantity used	Build date	Quantity used	Years withdrawn	Notes
TKb1	Prussian T 2			0-4-0T		1878	1	1878	1	to 1970	
TKbb101	Saxon I TV			0-4-4-0T	Hartmann	1910, 1914	3			before 1927	The only meyer locomotive used in Poland
TKh1	Prussian T 3			0-6-0T	Vulcan Stettin, Orenstein & Koppel, Hagans	1889–1909	23	1887–1905	24 + 4 Dz	1950s–1967	
TKh4	Prussian T 3			0-6-0T	Vulcan Stettin	1907–1910	3				
TKh2	Prussian T 7			0-6-0T	Union Giesserei, Hanomag, etc.			1881-1892	27	before 1936	
TKh3	Saxon V T			0-6-0T	Linke-Hoffman, Hartmann, etc.	1899	5	1906–1908	5	before 1931	
TKh5	DRG Class 89			0-6-0T	Berliner Maschinenbau, Henschel & Son	1934–1938	5			early 1950s	
TKh101	Bavarian D II^{II}, Bavarian R 3/3			0-6-0T	Krauss, Maffei			1898–1907	4	before 1931	
TKh102	VVZhD 26			0-6-0T	Krauss	1872	1			1924	
TKi1	Prussian T 9	T 9^{1}		0-6-2T	Borsig, Union Giesserei, Esslingen, BMAG	1901	4	1894–1901	43 + 3 Dz	to 1949	
TKi2	Prussian T 9	T 9^{2}		2-6-0T	Union Giesserei, Borsig	1897-1899	10	1893-1899	18 + 4 Dz	to 1953	
TKi3	Prussian T 9	T 9^{3}		2-6-0T	Union Giesserei, Henschel & Son, Jung, etc.	1901–1914	236	1901–1914	310 +20 Dz	1960s	
TKl100				2-6-2T	Borsig	1934	2			1956, 1971	
TKp1	Prussian T 13			0-8-0T	Union Giesserei, Hagans, Orenstein & Koppel, etc.	1910–1924	94	1910–1916	43	1960s	
TKp101	kukHB 578			0-8-0T	Henschel & Son	1916	5	1916	10	to 1974	
TKt1	Prussian T 14	T 14		2-8-2T	Union Giesserei, Hohenzollern, Henschel & Son	1914–1919	85	1915–1919	23 + 4 Dz	1960s–1972	
TKt2	Prussian T 14	T 14^{1}		2-8-2T	Union Giesserei, Hohenzollern, Esslingen	1918–1923	68	1919–1921	6	1960s–1972	
TKt3	DRG Class 86			2-8-2T	Schichau, Schwartzkopff. WLF, H. Cegielski	1928–1943	46			1970s	
TKw1	Prussian T 16, Prussian T 16^{1}			0-10-0	Schwartzkopff	1907–1913	39	1907–1923	57 + 3 Dz	1960s–1970	Prussian T 16^{1} classified as TKw1 until 1939, classified as TKw2 after 1945
TKw2	Prussian T 16^{1}			0-10-0	Schwarzkopff, Hanomag, Henschel & Son, Breslau	1913–1924	129			1970s	
TKw3	Saxon XI HT			0-10-0	Sachsische Maschinenfabrik, Chemnitz	1913–1942	6			1970s	

===== Locomotives of Austrian origin =====
Locomotive class	Locomotive origin	Image	Whyte	Manufacturer	Standard gauge (1435 mm)		Russian gauge (1520 mm)		Years withdrawn	Notes
Locomotive class	Locomotive origin	Image	Whyte	Manufacturer	Build date	Quantity used	Build date	Quantity used	Years withdrawn	Notes
TKb11	kkStB 85		0-4-0T	Wiener Neustadt			1882	1	before 1926	
TKb12	KEB 212		0-4-0T	Wiener Neustadt	1880	2			1921, before 1926	
TKb13	kkStB 88		0-4-0T	Wiener Neustadt, Krauss-Linz			1882-1885	14	before 1927	
TKb14	kkStB 86		0-4-0T	Krauss-Linz			1905	1	1931–1936	
TKh11	kkStB 93		0-6-0T	Krauss	1881	1			before 1925	
TKh12	kkStB 97		0-6-0T	Floridsdorf, Krauss-Linz, etc.			1891–1910	12	1930s	
TKh13	kkStB 95		0-6-0T	StEG			1884	1	before 1926	
TKh14	kkStB 394		0-6-0T	Floridsdorf			1895, 1903	3	before 1936	
TKh15	kkStB 98		0-6-0T	StEG			1886	1	before 1926	
TKh16	kkStB 464		0-6-0T	Krauss Linz						
TKh17	kkStB 66		0-6-0T	StEG			1901–1907	13	until 1939	
TKh18	kkStB 94		0-6-0T	Krauss-Linz			1899	3	until 1939	
TKp11	kkStB 178		0-8-0T	Floridsdorf, Krauss-Linz, StEG		2	1902–1917	28	1946–1961	
TKp12	kkStB 278		0-8-0T	Krauss-Linz			1910–1911	6	until 1939, early 1950s	

===== Locomotives of other origin =====
Locomotive class	Locomotive origin	Image	Whyte	Country of origin	Manufacturer	Standard gauge (1435 mm)		Russian gauge (1520 mm)		Years withdrawn	Notes
Locomotive class	Locomotive origin	Image	Whyte	Country of origin	Manufacturer	Build date	Quantity used	Build date	Quantity used	Years withdrawn	Notes
TKh103	MAV 377		0-6-0T	Hungary	MAVAG, StEG	1891, 1898	2			1932	

===== Locomotives built in Poland =====
Locomotive class	Image	Whyte	Manufacturer	Standard gauge (1435 mm)		Russian gauge (1520 mm)		Years withdrawn	Notes
Locomotive class	Image	Whyte	Manufacturer	Build date	Quantity used	Build date	Quantity used	Years withdrawn	Notes
TKh29		0-6-0T	Fablok	1929	1	1930	1	until 1939	
TKh49		0-6-0T	Fablok	1961	1			1996	
TKp30		0-8-0T	Fablok	1930	2			until 1939	
TKr55		2-8-0T	ZNTK Wrocław	1958	1			1972	
TKt48		2-8-2T	H. Cegielski, Fablok	1950–1957	191			1980s–1993	

=== Industrial locomotives ===
==== Coal locomotives ====
Locomotive type/class	Locomotive design type	Locomotive origin	Country of origin	Image	Whyte	Manufacturer	Build date	Quantity used	Years withdrawn	Notes
T1A Skarboferm	Tank locomotive				0-6-0T	Fablok	1927–1929	5	1970s	
T1B Renard	Tank locomotive				2-10-2T	Fablok	1928	2	early 1970s	
T1C and T2C	Tank locomotive				0-4-0T	Fablok	1928	3	1950, 1952	
T1D Rawicz	Tank locomotive				0-8-0T	Fablok	1930	2	early 1950s	
T2A	Tank locomtoive				0-6-0T	Fablok	1929	1	1946	
T3C	Tank locomotive				0-4-0T	Fablok				
Baziel	Tank locomotive				0-4-0T	Fablok	1948–1951	20	1970s	
T3A	Tank locomotive				0-6-0T	Fablok	1948–1961	387	1980s–1990s	
TKP Śląsk	Tank locomotive				0-8-0T	Fablok	1950–1963	316	1980s–1990s	
TKy	Tank locomotive		German Empire		2-10-0T	Borsig	1913	3	1970s	
TKz	Tank locomotive	DRG Class 95	Germany		2-10-2T	Borsig	1935–1938	6	1970s	
Ty45	Tender locomotive				2-10-0	H. Cegielski, Fablok	1947–1951	20	1980s–1990s	
Ty51	Tender locomotive				2-10-0	H. Cegielski	1955–1958	24	1980s–1992	

==== Fireless locomotives ====
Locomotive type/class	Image	Whyte	Manufacturer	Build date	Quantity used	Years withdrawn	Notes
1U		0-4-0F	Fablok, ZNTK Wrocław	1956–1967	43	1990s	
TKi3b		2-6-0F	ZNTK Wrocław	1953–1959	59		
TKh4b		0-6-0F	ZNTK Wrocław	1953–1956	28		

=== Steam railcars ===
Railcar type/class		Image	UIC class	Manufacturer	Build date	Quantity used	Years withdrawn	Notes
90 001			B1	Franco-Belge	1886	1	1927	
90 061			1A1	Komarek	1906	1	1929	
90 002			B'2'	Clayton	1928	1	1940s	
PCix	90 004		(A1)'2'	Lilpop	1930	1	mid 1930s	
PCix	90 005 – 010, 026 – 028		(A1)'2'	H. Cegielski	1931	9	1940s	

=== Tenders ===
Tender class	Image	Number of axles	Manufacturer	Build date	Quantity used	Used on locomotive class	Notes
27D24		4	Fablok	from 1925	60	Os24	
22D23		4		from 1922	918	Ok22, Ty23, Ty37, Tr21	
32D29		4	H. Cegielski	1931–1940	113	Pu29, Pt31	
12C1		3		from 1890s	around 1000	Pd1, Od2, Th1, Ti4, Tp1, Tp2, Tp3	
17C1		3	Schichau	from 1913		Tp4, Tw1, Pk1, Ok1	
20C1		3		from 1918		Ty1, Tr3, Tr6	
16D1		4	Various German manufacturers			Pd1, Od1, Od2, Tp3	
22D1		4	Various German manufacturers			Pd5, Oi1, Ok1	
22D2		4		from 1911		Ok1	
32D2		4	Various German manufacturers	from 1912		Pk1, Pk2, Pk3, Pt1, Ok1, Ty4	
12C11		3		1885-1896	271	Tp15, Th24	
12C13		3		built until 1910	92		
16C11		3	Sanok		586	Tw12, Tr12, Tr21	
27D11		4		1908–1918	127	Pn11, Pn12	
21D20		4	Baldwin Locomotive Works	1919–1922	175	Tr20	
25D201/203		4	Baldwin Locomotive Works, American Locomotive Company, Lima Locomotives Works	1942–1945	575	Tr201, Tr203	
25D202		4	Vulcan Foundry	1947	100	Ty246	
16C1		3	Schichau, Krupp, Breslau	1928–1940	34	Oi2	
26D5		4		from 1939		Ty5, Ty2, Pt31, Pt47	
34D44		4		from 1937		Pt47, Ty2	
34D44 (32D3)		4		1939–1940		Pm3, Pt31, Pu29	
30D42		4	Floridsdorf			Ty2	Rebuilt by ZNTK Bydgoszcz
30D43		4	Various German manufacturers			Ty2	
32D47		4	Pafawag	1948–1951		Pt47, Ty45, Ty43, Ty2, Ty42	
32D36		4	Fablok	1937	2	Pm36	
32D46		4	American Locomotive Company, Baldwin Locomotive Works, Lima Locomotives Works	1947	100	Ty246	
34D48		4				Pt47	
30D55		4	ZNTK Wrocław	1959	1	Ok55-3	
33D48		4	ZNTK Piła			Pt47, Ty2, Ty45	
25D49		4	Pafawag	1951–1954	116	Ol49	
27D51		4				Ty51	

== Gasoline stock ==
=== Gasoline locomotives ===
Locomotive type/class	Transmission	Traffic	UIC class	Manufacturer	Build date	Quantity used	Years retired	Notes
FIAT 35	Mechanical	Lightweight shunting/Works transportation	B	WSABP	1936	4		

=== Gasoline railcars ===
Railcar type/class		Image	Transmission	Traffic	UIC class	Manufacturer	Build date	Quantity used	Years retired	Notes
ESCix 90			Electric	Suburban	2'Bo'	Weyer	1910	1	1937	
SBCi 90			Mechanical	Suburban	A1	Ganz	1927	1		
SCix 90			Mechanical	Suburban	(1A)'(A1)'	Deutsche Werke Kiel AG	1928, 1929	2		Rebuilt into trailer cars
Luxtorpeda	Prototype SAx 90		Hydraulic	Long-range	(1A)'(A1)'	Austro-Daimler	1933	1	Bombed in WWII	
Luxtorpeda	SAx 90		Hydraulic	Long-range	(1A)'(A1)'	Fablok	1936	5	until 1939	

== Diesel stock ==
=== Diesel locomotives ===
==== Diesel mechanical locomotives ====
Locomotive type/class	Image	Traffic	UIC class	Manufacturer	Build date	Quantity used	Years retired	Nicknames	Notes
Fablok 2DL		Lightweight shunting	B	Fablok	1935	1			
Fablok 3DL		Lightweight shunting	B	Fablok	1936–1938	7			
Fablok 8DL		Lightweight shunting	B	Fablok	1939	1			
SM01		Lightweight shunting	B	Deutz Esselingen Humboldt etc.		3			
LKM N3		Lightweight shunting	B	Maschinenbau und bahnbedarf aktiengesellschaft	1952–1956	9			
SM02		Lightweight shunting	B	Fablok	1952–1961	581	1990s – 2010s		
LKM N4		Lightweight shunting	B	Maschinenbau und bahnbedarf aktiengesellschaft	1957	34			
Ls75 and 2Ls75		Lightweight shunting	B	Fablok	1958–1960	20	1970s – 1980s		
SM03		Lightweight shunting	B	Fablok Zastal	1959–1969	875		Kaczka (Duck) Kogucik (Little rooster)	
Fablok Ls60		Lightweight shunting	B	Fablok Zastal	1961–1971	562	1990s – 2010s		Development of SM02
SM04		Lightweight shunting	B	Zastal Mystal ZNTK Oleśnica	1969–1992	865		Kaczka (Duck)	

==== Diesel hydraulic locomotives ====
Owned abroad, certified for operation in Poland
Exported aborad

Locomotive type/class		Image	Traffic	UIC class	Manufacturer	Build date	Quantity used	Years retired	Nicknames	Notes
Ld2-18-100			Lightweight shunting	B	Lilpop	1939	9			
Zastal 410D			Lightweight shunting	B	Zastal	1971–1975	51	1990s		
TGK2			Midweight shunting	B	Kaluga machine building factory	1986	2	2013		
LDH18			Lightweight/Midweight shunting	B	FAUR	1984 1987 1988	4			
Kolzam 418D			Midweight shunting	B	Kolzam	1999-2002	3			
LM-400			Midweight shunting	Bo	ZPS	2012	1			
SM25			Midweight shunting	C	Fablok	1960–1963	3	1970 1973 1975		
TGM40			Midweight shunting	Bo'Bo'	Kambarka Engineering Works	1988–1990	18			Standard gauge variant of the locomotive
LDH45			Midweight shunting	B'B'	FAUR	1980–1989	26			
LDH70			Midweight shunting	B'B'	FAUR	1982–1987	5			
SM15	SM15		Midweight shunting	B'B'	Lyudinovsky Locomotive Plant	1962	2	1980s		
SM15	Ls750H		Midweight shunting	B'B'	Fablok	1963–1966	30	1970s–1980s		
SM15	Ls750Hu		Midweight shunting	B'B'	Fablok	1966–1967	25	1970s–1980s		
Maxima			Freight	C'C'	Voith	2008 2009	4			Owned by Germany, certified for operation in Poland
Vossloh G6			Midweight shunting	C	Vossloh	2012	1	2016		Exported to Croatia

==== Diesel electric locomotives ====
Owned abroad, certified for operation in Poland
Exported aborad

Locomotive type/class		Image	Traffic	UIC class	Manufacturer	Build date	Quantity used	Years retired	Nicknames	Notes
Fablok G1C			Works transportation	Bo	Fablok	1931	1	1970s		Prototype, captured by Germans in WWII, converted into a flatcar
797			Midweight shunting	B	CZ LOKO	2007 2011	2			
SM32			Midweight shunting	C	Fablok	1968–1978	501		Kaczka (Duck)	
1D	SM30		Midweight shunting	Bo'Bo'	Fablok	1956–1971	909		Żaba (Frog)	
1D	SP30		Passenger	Bo'Bo'	ZNTK Nowy Sącz	1974–1978	109	Late 1980s – 1990s	Żaba (Frog)	SM30 passenger variant
Effishunter 300	794		Midweight shunting	B	CZ LOKO	2019	1			
Effishunter 300	SM60		Midweight shunting	B	CZ LOKO	2021-2022	10			
MAV Class M44	SM40		Midweight shunting	Bo'Bo'	MAVAG	1958	10	Between 1980s and 1990s		
MAV Class M44	SM41		Midweight shunting	Bo'Bo'	Ganz-MAVAG	1961–1971	372	1990s	Ganz	
Fablok 6D	6D		Midweight/Heavy shunting	Bo'Bo'	Fablok	1963–1992	1819		Stonka (California beetle), Wibrator (Vibrator), Eleska	
Fablok 6D	6Dc		Midweight/Heavy shunting	Bo'Bo'	ZNTK Piła	1996	1	2010	Stonka (California beetle)	SM42 modernization
Fablok 6D	Ls1000		Midweight/Heavy shunting	Bo'Bo'	PTKiGK Rybnik	1999 2002	2		Stonka (California beetle)	SM42 modernization
Fablok 6D	6Dc		Midweight/Heavy shunting	Bo'Bo'	Huta Częstochowa ZNTK Poznań	1999-2002	7		Stonka (California beetle)	SM42 modification
Fablok 6D	6Dg		Midweight/Heavy shunting	Bo'Bo'	Newag	2007-2024	215		Kiosk	SM42 modernization
Fablok 6D	6Dk		Midweight/Heavy shunting	Bo'Bo'	Pesa	2009-2012	6			SM42 modernization
Fablok 6D	18D		Midweight/Heavy shunting	Bo'Bo'	Newag	2014	10			SM42 modernization
Fablok 6D	6Dl		Mixed traffic	Bo'Bo'	Newag	2014-2015	10			SM42 modernization
Fablok 6D	6Di		Midweight/Heavy shunting	Bo'Bo'	Pesa	2015	1			SM42 modernization
Fablok 6D	6Dm		Midweight/Heavy shunting	Bo'Bo'	ORION Kolej	2015 2025	2			SM42 modernization
Fablok 6D	6Dh		Midweight/Heavy shunting	Bo'Bo'	Tabor Dębica	2016-2025	27			SM42 modernization
Fablok 6D	SU4220		Mixed traffic	Bo'Bo'	H. Cegielski	2022	13			SM42 modernization
SP42			Passenger	Bo'Bo'	Fablok	1970–1978	268	1999 2009	Kociołek (Boiler), Łajka, Wibrator (Vibrator), Eleska	Passenger version of the SM42 design
SU42			Mixed traffic	Bo'Bo'	ZNTK Nowy Sącz	1975–1979 1999-2000	79		Polsat, Stonka (California beetle)	SM42 and SP42 conversion to mixed traffic, mostly used for passenger traffic
SP32			Passenger	Bo'Bo'	FAUR	1985–1991	150	2000s 2010s	Odkurzacz (Vacuum cleaner), Rumun (Romanian), Papuga (Parrot)	
T419p			Midweight/Heavy shunting	Bo'Bo'	CKD	1989	1	2012		Exported to the Czech Republic in 2012
T448p	T448p		Midweight/Heavy shunting	Bo'Bo'	CKD	1976–1989	161			
T448p	740		Midweight/Heavy shunting	Bo'Bo'	CKD	1976–1986	8			Operated in Poland, owned by the Czech Republic
T458			Midweight shunting	Bo'Bo'	CKD	1965 1971 1972	4			
LDE125			Heavy shunting	Bo'Bo'	FAUR	1977	3			
SM31			Heavy shunting, Freight	Co'Co'	Fablok	1976–1985	197		Trumna (Coffin)	
S200	S200		Heavy shunting, Freight	Co'Co'	CKD	1966–1989	143			
S200	770		Heavy shunting, Freight	Co'Co'	CKD	1984	1	2018		Exported to Albania
TEM2	SM48		Heavy shunting, Freight	Co'Co'	Bryansk Locomotive Works	1974–1989	100		Tamara	
TEM2	TEM2		Heavy shunting, Freight	Co'Co'	Bryansk Locomotive Works	1974–1990	328		Tamara	
TEM2	21D		Heavy shunting, Freight	Co'Co'	Tabor Dębica	1974–1988	7		Tamara	TEM2 modification
TEM2	TEM2B		Heavy shunting, Freight	Co'Co'	Bryansk Locomotive Works	1988 1990	8		Tamara	Imported TEM2 locomotives from Bulgaria
TEM2	Newag 16D		Freight	Co'Co'	Newag	2010-2013	9		Turbotamara	TEM2 modernization for broad gauge
TEM2	ST48		Freight	Co'Co'	Newag	2013 – 2020	80		Turbotamara	SM48 moderniation
TEM2	Newag 15D		Freight	Co'Co'	Newag	2016-2024	46		Turbotamara	TEM2 modernization
TEM2	Newag 19D		Freight	Co'Co'	Newag	2018	1		Turbotamara	TEM2 modernization
TEM18			Heavy shunting	Co'Co'	Bryansk Locomotive Works	2006	1	2015		Exported to Guinea
Electroputere 060DA	ST43		Freight	Co'Co'	Electroputere	1965–1978	422	2010s	Rumun (Romanian)	
Electroputere 060DA	060DA		Freight	Co'Co'	Electroputere	1964–1993	35		Rumun (Romanian)	Only 2 in Poland, most of them returned to Romania, some were scrapped
Electroputere 060DA	ST43R		Freight	Co'Co'		1964–1992	15		Rumun (Romanian)	060DA modernization for CTL, most of them displaced and some scrapped
ST44	ST44		Freight	Co'Co'	Voroshilovgrad Locomotive Works	1965–1988	1194	1980s–1990s 2019-2022	Gagarin Iwan	
ST44	M62Ko		Freight	Co'Co'	Pesa	2008-2021	79		Gagarin Gagar	ST44 modernization, 76 for PKP Cargo, 3 for private companies
ST44	311D		Freight	Co'Co'	Newag	2007-2008	20		Batman	ST44 modernization
ST44	ST40s		Freight	Co'Co'	Newag	2008-2010	17		Batman	Broad gauge metallurgy line variant of 311D locomotive, ST44 modernization
ST44	M62Ks		Freight	Co'Co'	Pesa	2009-2016	32		Gagarin Gagar	ST44 modernization for the broad gauge metallurgy line
ST44	ST44-3000		Freight	Co'Co'	Fablok	2005	2			ST44 modernization for the broad gauge metallurgy line
M62	M62		Freight	Co'Co'	Voroshilovgrad Locomotive Works	1966–1993	105		Gagarin Gagar	
M62	ST44R		Freight	Co'Co'		2004-2005	9		Gagarin Gagar	V200 modernization for CTL, several modificated and changed designation to M62, only 1 remains
M62	M62M		Freight	Co'Co'	Rail Polska	2005-2012	16		Gagarin Gagar	M62 modification
M62	M62BF		Freight	Co'Co'	Fablok	2009	4		Gagarin Gagar	M62 modernization with the ST44-3000 design
M62	M62Y		Freight	Co'Co'	Tabor Szynowy Opole	2012	2			2M62U modernization, rebuilt into dual cab locomotives in Latvia, exported to Serbia
M62	313D		Freight	Co'Co'	Pesa	2014	1		Gagarin Gagar	M62 modernization
HCP 301D	SP45		Passenger	Co'Co'	H. Cegielski	1967–1976	265	1998 1999	Fiat	
HCP 301D	SU45		Mixed traffic	Co'Co'	ZNTK Poznań	1988–1997	191	2010-2016	Fiat	
HCP 301D	ST45		Freight	Co'Co'	Pesa	2009-2012	19	2017-2020	Brzydula (Ugly)	SU45 modernization
DRG Class 130 family	BR231		Freight	Co'Co'	October Revolution Locomotive Works	1973–1977	9		Ludmiła (Ludmilla)	
DRG Class 130 family	BR232		Freight	Co'Co'	October Revolution Locomotive Works	1973–1982	81		Ludmiła (Ludmilla)	
DRG Class 130 family	BR233		Freight	Co'Co'	October Revolution Locomotive Works	1973–1981	12		Ludmiła (Ludmilla)	
HCP 303D	SU46		Mixed traffic	Co'Co'	H. Cegielski	1974–1977 1985	54	2015-2023	Suka	
HCP 303D	ST46		Freight	Co'Co'	Pesa	2012	1	2018		SU46 modernization
SP47			Passenger	Co'Co'	H. Cegielski	1975–1977	2	1997 1998	Długa Suka	
753			Freight	Bo'Bo'	CKD	1972–1977	11			Owned by the Czech republic, certified for operation in Poland
754			Passenger	Bo'Bo'	CKD	1978–1979	6		Nurek (Diver)	
SU175			Mixed traffic	Co'Co'	Henschel & Son	1981–1985	6			Not yet in service
DE 6400			Heavy shunting, Freight	Bo'Bo'	MaK	1988–1993	40			
Class 66			Freight	Co'Co'	Electro-Motive Diesel	1999-2008	51			
BR285			Freight	Bo'Bo'	Bombardier Transportation	2010-2011	10			
SU160			Passenger	Bo'Bo'	Pesa	2014-2015	10		Gama	

=== Diesel multiple units ===
==== Diesel railcars ====
Railcar type/class		Image	Traffic	Transmission	UIC class	Manufacturer	Build date	Quantity used	Years retired	Notes
SC 90			Suburban	Mechanical	A1	Lilpop	1934	1		Captured by Germany, returned to Poland in 1950
SCgx	90 063		Suburban	Mechanical	(1A)'(A1)'	Lilpop	1934	1		
SCgx	90 064		Suburban	Mechanical	B'2'	WSABP	1934	1	Destroyed in 1939	
SCgx	90 092 – 094		Suburban	Mechanical	B'2'	Sanok	1936	3		2 examples destroyed in WWII, 1 returned to Poland in 1947
Luxtorpeda	SBCgix 90		Long-range	Mechanical	(1A)'(A1)'	H. Cegielski	1934	1		
Luxtorpeda	SBix 90		Long-range	Mechanical	(1A)'(A1)'	H. Cegielski Lilpop	1935 1936	9		2 examples were captured by Germany
Luxtorpeda	SBx 90 076 – 079, 90 086		Long-range	Hydraulic	(1A)'(A1)'	H. Cegielski	1936	5		Destroyed in WWII in 1939
Luxtorpeda	SBx 90 099 – 113		Long-range	Mechanical	(1A)'(A1)'	H. Cegielski	1939	10		2 examples were captured by Germany, 1 example was used by Czechoslovak Railways, several examples were returned to Poland
SCix 90			Suburban	Electric	Bo'2'	WPZO	1936	1		90 002 steam railcar rebuild into diesel traction
ESCx 90			Suburban	Electric	(1A)'(A1)'	Huta Królewska w Chorzowie	1936	1		
SCi 90			Suburban	Mechanical	A1	Lilpop	1935	10	1955	
SBCix 90			Suburban	Electric	Bo'2'	H. Cegielski	1938	3		
SN51	01		Suburban	Mechanical	AA	Waggonbau Görlitz	1939	1	1962	
SN51	02		Suburban	Mechanical	A1	Waggonbau Görlitz	1939	1	1966	
SN51	04		Suburban	Mechanical	A1	Talbot	1936	1	1962	
SD80			Long-range	Hydraulic	(1A)'(A1)'	Officine Meccaniche	1949	3	1963	1 example rebuilt into SR70, later preserved
SN52			Suburban	Mechanical	B'2'	Ganz	1954–1955	50	1980s	
SN60			Suburban	Mechanical	B'2'	Ganz	1956	4	1970s–1980s	
SN80			Suburban	Hydraulic	B'2'	H. Cegielski	1961–1964	13	1979	
SN61	01 – 130		Suburban	Mechanical	B'2'	Ganz-MAVAG	1960–1965	130	1980s	
SN61	131 – 200		Suburban	Mechanical	B'2'	Ganz-MAVAG	1969–1972	70	1980s	
SN61	500 – 549		Suburban	Mechanical	B'2'	Ganz-MAVAG	1971–1975	50	1980s–1990s	
627	VT627.0		Suburban	Hydraulic	B'2'	Linke-Hoffman Busch MaK	1974–1975	3		
627	VT627.1		Suburban	Hydraulic	B'2'	MaK	1981–1982	4		
810			Suburban	Hydrau-mechanical	A'1'	Vagonka Studenka	1976–1984	8		
SN82			Suburban	Hydraulic	B'2'	Waggonfabrik Uerdingen	1983	3		

==== Diesel railbuses ====
Owned abroad, certified for operation in Poland

Rabilbus type/class		Image	Traffic	Transmission	UIC class	Manufacturer	Build date	Quantity used	Years retired	Nicknames	Notes
SN81			Suburban	Mechanical	1'A'+1'1'	Kolzam	1988–1990	5	2008 2014 2015		
SA104			Railbus	Hydrau-mechanical	A'A'+1'1'	Kolzam	1995	1	2013		Electrical malfunction led to a fire in which it had to be retired from service
ZNTK Poznań 207M	SA101		Railbus	Hydrau-mechanical	1'A'+1'1'	ZNTK Poznań	1990–1992	3	2014 2016		
ZNTK Poznań 207M	SA102-001		Railbus	Hydrau-mechanical	1'A'+1'1'+A'1'	ZNTK Poznań	1993	1	2016		
ZNTK Poznań 207M	SA102-002, 003		Railbus	Hydraulic	1'A'+1'1'+A'1' 1'A'+A'1'	ZNTK Poznań	1996	2	2016		Fully hydraulic version of the 207M railbuses
Kolzam Regiovan	SA107		Railbus	Hydrau-mechanical	A'1'	Kolzam	2003-2004	2			
Kolzam Regiovan	SA109		Railbus	Hydrau-mechanical	A'1'+1'A'	Kolzam	2003-2005 2012	11			
SA105	213M		Railbus	Hydrau-mechanical	A'1'	ZNTK Poznań	2002	2		Żelazko (Iron), Rzelazko	
SA105	213Ma		Railbus	Hydrau-mechanical	A'1'	ZNTK Poznań	2003-2004	5		Żelazko (Iron), Rzelazko	Screw couple version of the SA105 railbus
SA108			Railbus	Hydrau-mechanical	A'1'+1'A'	ZNTK Poznań	2003-2006	10		Żelazko (Iron), Rzelazko	Dual unit version of the SA105 railbus
Pesa 214M	SA106-001		Railbus	Hydraulic	B'2	Pesa	2001	1			
Pesa 214M	SA106-002 – 019		Railbus	Hydraulic	B'2	Pesa	2003-2007	18			011 – 019 design modified
Pesa 214M	SA103		Railbus	Hydro-mechanical	B'2	Pesa	2005-2006	13			
Pesa 214M	SA135		Railbus	Hydrau-mechanical	B'2'	Pesa ZNTK Minsk Mazowiecki	2008-2015	24		Pesobus	004 – 014 ZNTK Minsk Mazowiecki design
Pesa 218M	SA131		Railbus	Hydraulic	B'2'2'	Pesa	2005	1			
Pesa 218M	SA132		Railbus	Hydrau-mechanical	B'2'B'	Pesa	2005-2007	15		Pesobus	001 – 007 218Ma 007 – 015 218Mb
Pesa 218M	SA133		Railbus	Hydraulic	B'2'B'	Pesa	2006-2015	31		Pesobus	
Pesa 218M	SA134		Railbus	Hydrau-mechanical	B'2'B'	Pesa ZNTK Minsk Mazowiecki	2007-2014	29		Pesobus	015 – 029 ZNTK Minsk Mazowiecki design
SA136			Railbus	Hydraulic	B'2'2'B'	Pesa	2010-2011 2015	19		Pesobus	
Newag 220M/221M	SA137		Railbus	Hydrau-mechanical	B'2'B'	Newag	2010-2014	9			
Newag 220M/221M	SA138		Railbus	Hydrau-mechanical	B'2'2'B'	Newag	2010-2012	5			
SA139			Railbus	Hydrau-mechanical	B'2'B'	Pesa	2012-2015	14			
Newag 222M	222M		Railbus	Hydrau-mechanical	B'2'B'	Newag	2013 2015	2			
Newag 222M	SA140		Railbus	Hydrau-mechanical	B'2'B'	Newag	2018 2020	4			
640			Railbus	Hydrau-mechanical	B'2'	Alstom	1999-2000	9			Not yet in service
646/946			Suburban	Electric	2'B'2'	Stadler	1999-2002	36			Owned by Germany, certified for operation in Poland
642			Suburban	Hydrau-mechanic	B'2'B'	Siemens Mobility	2000	6			Owned by Germany, certified for operation in Poland
VT series			Suburban	Hydrau-mechanical	B'2'B'	Bombardier Transportation	2005-2006	8		Parówka (Frankfurter)	Owned by Germany, certified for operation in Poland

==== Diesel multiple units ====
Multiple unit type/class		Image	Traffic	Transmission	UIC class	Manufacturer	Build date	Quantity used	Years retired	Notes
MA series			Long-range	Hydraulic	B'2'+2'2'+2'2'+2'2'	MAN/Linke-Hoffman Busch	1963–1966	5	1994	
SA110			Suburban	Hydraulic	B'2'+2'2'+2'B'	MAN Waggonfabrik Uerdingen	1964–1966	14	2010-2011	
628	VT628		Suburban	Hydraulic	2'B'+B'2'	Waggonfabrik Uerdingen Linke-Hoffman Busch	1974	4		
628	628.4		Suburban	Hydraulic	2'B'+2'2'	Waggonfabrik Uerdingen	1993	6		
SN84			Long-range	Hydraulic	B'2'+2'2'+2'B'	Waggonfabrik Uerdingen/MAN	1973–1976	5		
MR+MRD			Suburban	Hydraulic	2'B'+B'2'	Waggonfabrik Uerdingen Scandia	1978–1984	7	2022	
Y series			Suburban	Hydrau-mechanical	(1A)'(A1)'+2'2'+(+2'2')	Waggonfabrik Uerdingen	1965/1970	1		
SN83			Suburban	Hydraulic	2'B'+B'2'	Duwag	1981–1982	7		
SD85			Long-range	Hydraulic	2'B'+B'2'	Talbot	1996–1998	32		

== Hydrogen stock ==
=== Hydrogen locomotives ===
Locomotive type/class	Image	Traffic	Transmission	UIC class	Manufacturer	Build date	Quantity used	Notes
SM42-6Dn		Midweight/Heavyweight shunting	Electric	Bo'Bo'	Pesa	2021	1	Not yet in service

=== Hydrogen multiple units ===
Locomotive type/class	Image	Traffic	Transmission	UIC class	Manufacturer	Build date	Quantity used	Notes
SD85		Long-range	Hydraulic	2'B'+B'2'	SKPL Cargo, DIGAS, Microluch	2026	1	SD85 rebuilt into hydrogen multiple unit

== Electric stock ==
=== Electric locomotives ===
==== 3 kV DC system locomotives ====
Owned abroad, certified for operation in Poland
Leased

Locomotive type/class		Image	Traffic	UIC class	Manufacturer	Build date	Quantity used	Years retired	Nicknames	Notes
E.626			Passenger	Bo'BoBo'	Breda	1931	5	1962		2 examples destroyed in WWII, 3 examples transported to Prague
EP01			Passenger	Bo'Bo'	English Electric Fablok	1936 1939	10	1964		Several examples destroyed in WWII and transported from Poland
EL.200			Passenger	Bo'Bo'	H. Cegielski	1938	4	Destroyed in WWII		
EP03			Passenger	Bo'Bo'	ASEA	1951	8	Early 1970s		
EP02			Passenger	Bo'Bo'	Pafawag	1953–1957	8	1970s		
EU04			Mixed traffic	Bo'Bo'	LEW Henningsdorf	1954–1955	25	1970s–1980s	Bezerka	
2E53			Freight	Co'Co'	Pafawag	1954–1956	9	1970s		
EU20			Mixed traffic	Co'Co'	LEW Henningsdorf	1955–1957	34	1970s–1980s	Bezerka	
ET21	3E		Freight	Co'Co'	Pafawag	1957–1960	83	1980s–1990s	Telewizor (TV), Sputnik	
ET21	3E/1		Freight	Co'Co'	Pafawag	1960–1971	643	1970s–1980s	Telewizor (TV), Sputnik	
ET21	3E-100		Freight	Co'Co'	Newag	2010-2014	9		Telewizor (TV), Sputnik	ET21 modernization
ET21	3E/1		Freight	Co'Co'	ZNTK	2010-2016	21		Telewizor (TV), Sputnik	ET21 modernization
ET21	3E/1M		Freight	Co'Co'	ZNTK Oleśnica Newag	2009-2015	7		Telewizor (TV), Sputnik	ET21 modernization
Skoda 43E	EU05		Mixed traffic	Bo'Bo'	Skoda	1961	30			
Skoda 43E	EP05		Passenger	Bo'Bo'	ZNTK Gdańsk	1973–1977	27	1970s–1980s	Piątka (Five), Czesio	EU05 modification
Skoda 43E	ET05		Freight	Bo'Bo'	Skoda	1960	12			Leased locomotive
Skoda 43E	121		Freight	Bo'Bo'	Skoda	1960	14			Owned by the Czech Republic, certified for operation in Poland
EU06			Mixed traffic	Bo'Bo'	English Electric	1962	20	2012-2013	Anglik (The Englishman)	
EU07	4E		Mixed traffic	Bo'Bo'	Pafawag	1965–1974	240		Siódemka (The seven)	
EU07	303E		Mixed traffic	Bo'Bo'	H. Cegielski ZNTK Oleśnica	1983–1994	245		Siódemka (The seven)	3 examples were rebuilt from ET41 by ZNTK Oleśnica in 1990–1994
EU07	EU07A		Passenger	Bo'Bo'	ZNTK Oleśnica	2011 2014	3		Siódemka (The seven)	EU07 modernization
EU07	303Eb		Mixed traffic	Bo'Bo'	ZNLE Gliwice Ostrów Wielkopolski	2011 2013	29		Siódemka (The seven)	EU07 modernization for PKP Cargo
EU07	303Ec		Mixed traffic	Bo'Bo'	ZNLE Gliwice	2011	1		Siódemka (The seven)	EU07 modernization for PKP Cargo
EU07	EP07		Passenger	Bo'Bo'	ZNTK	1995-2005	100		Siódemka (The seven)	EU07 modification
EU07	EP07		Passenger	Bo'Bo'	Various	2007-2008	69		Siódemka (The seven), Budyń (Pudding)	EU07 modification for Polregio (Now in part of PKP Intercity)
EU07	EP07P		Passenger	Bo'Bo'	ZNLE Gliwice	2012	5		Siódemka (The seven)	EU07 modernization for Polregio
ET22	201E		Freight	Co'Co'	Pafawag	1969–1989	1181		Byk (Bull)	
ET22	201Ea		Freight	Co'Co'	Pafawag	1978	2	2006	Byk (Bull)	ET22 with multiple unit control
ET22	EP23		Passenger	Co'Co'	Pafawag	1973	1	1998	Byk (Bull)	Passenger version of ET22
ET22	ET22R		Freight	Co'Co'	ZNTK Oleśnica	2004	5		Byk (Bull)	Moroccan E-1000 and ET22 modernization for CTL
ET22	201Em		Freight	Co'Co'	ZNLE Gliwice	2004-2010	28		Byk (Bull)	ET22 modernization
ET22	201Ek		Freight	Co'Co'	ZNLE Giwice	2010-2011	20		Byk (Bull)	ET22 modernization
ET22	201El		Freight	Co'Co'	ZNLE Gliwice	2012	17		Byk (Bull)	ET22 modernization
ET22	201Eo		Freight	Co'Co'	ZNTK Oleśnica	2012-2015	14		Byk (Bull)	ET22 and Moroccan E-1000 modernization for private companies
ET22	ET22-1034		Freight	Co'Co'	Tabor Dębica	2014 2016 2018	3		Byk (Bull)	ET22 modification for Tabor Dębica
ET22	Toro-002		Freight	Co'Co'	Tabor Dębica	2024	1		Byk (Bull)	ET22 modernziation for Tabor Dębica
EP08			Passenger	Bo'Bo'	Pafawag	1972–1976	15		Świnia (Pig) Arka Gdynia	
Skoda 77E	ET40		Freight	Bo'Bo'+Bo'Bo'	Skoda	1975–1978	60	2011	Bombowiec (Bombardier)	
Skoda 77E	EP40		Passenger	Bo'Bo'+Bo'Bo'	ZNTK Gdańsk	1990	1	1993		ET40 conversion into passenger traffic
ET41			Freight	Bo'Bo'+Bo'Bo"	H. Cegielski	1977–1983	200		Jamnik (Dachshund)	
ET42			Freight	Bo'Bo'+Bo'Bo'	Novocherkassk Electric Locomotive Plant	1978–1982	50	2025	Czapajew	
EP09			Passenger	Bo'Bo'	Pafawag	1986–1997	47		Dziewiątka (The nine), Palnik (Torch), Rodzyn (Raisin)	
EM10	405E		Heavy shunting	Bo'Bo'	H. Cegielski	1990	2			
EM10	405Ea		Heavy shunting	Bo'Bo'	H. Cegielski	1990 1991	2			
EM10	405Em		Heavy Shunting	Bo'Bo'	ZNLE Gliwice	2004	4	2009		EM10 modernization
Zapychacz UFO			Midweight/Heavy shunting	Bo'Bo'	REMB	2002	1			SM42 rebuild into an electric locomotive
Newag Dragon	E6ACT		Freight	Co'Co'	Newag	2009-2014	9			
Newag Dragon	E6ACTd		Freight	Co'Co'	Newag	2016-2017	6			
Newag Dragon	ET25		Freight	Co'Co'	Newag	2018	3			
Newag Dragon	E6ACTa		Freight	Co'Co'	Newag	2018-2019	16			
Newag Dragon	ET26		Freight	Co'Co'	Newag	2019	7			
Newag Dragon	E6ACTab		Freight	Co'Co'	Newag	2019-2024	27			
X4EC			Freight	Bo'Bo'	Siemens	2010-2014	26		Vectron	
Traxx	EU47		Passenger	Bo'Bo'	Bombardier Transportation	2010-2011	11			
Traxx	E483		Freight	Bo'Bo'	Bombardier Transportation	2010 2011 2016	15			
Traxx	594		Freight	Bo'Bo'	Alstom	2019-2025	30			
Pesa Gama	111Eb		Mixed traffic	Bo'Bo'	Pesa	2015-2016	4			
Pesa Gama	111Eo		Freight	Bo'Bo'	Pesa	2022-2023	9			
Newag Griffin	E4DCUd		Freight	Bo'Bo'	Newag	2017	5		Gryfin (Griffin)	
Newag Griffin	EU160		Passenger	Bo'Bo'	Newag	2019-2025	98		Złom (Scrap), Gryfin (Griffin)	
Newag Griffin	E4DCU		Freight	Bo'Bo'	Newag	2021	1		Gryfin (Griffin)	
207E			Freight	Co'Co'	ZNTK Oleśnica	2017-2025	13		Edgar	M62 rebuild into an electric locomotive
Skoda 12E	ET13		Freight	Bo'Bo'	Skoda	1957–1958	3			Leased locomotive
Skoda 12E	140		Freight	Bo'Bo'	Skoda	1957–1958	13			Owned by the Czech Republic, certified for operation in Poland, 2 owned by Rail Polska
30E1			Freight	Bo'Bo'	Skoda	1959	2	2019		
Skoda 79E	ET11		Freight	Bo'Bo'	Skoda	1977	7			Leased locomotive
Skoda 79E	130		Freight	Bo'Bo'	Skoda	1977	43			Owned by the Czech Republic, certified for operation in Poland
Skoda 31E	181		Freight	Co'Co'	Skoda	1961–1962	54			
Skoda 31E	ET23		Freight	Co'Co'	Skoda	1961	1			Leased locomotive
182			Freight	Co'Co'	Skoda	1963–1965	64			
183			Freight	Co'Co'	Skoda	1971	25			Owned by the Czech Republic, certified for operation in Poland
131			Freight	Bo'Bo'+Bo'Bo'	Skoda	1980–1982	50			Owned by the Czech Republic, certified for operation in Poland
163			Mixed traffic	Bo'Bo'	Skoda	1985–1986	16			Leased locomotive

==== Multi system locomotives ====
Owned abroad, certified for operation in Poland
Leased

Locomotive type/class		Image	Traffic	UIC class	Manufacturer	Build date	Quantity used	Years retired	Nicknames	Notes
SGP 1822			Freight	Bo'Bo'	Simmering-Graz-Pauker	1993	2	2011		
Traxx	EU43		Mixed traffic	Bo'Bo'	Bombardier Transportation	2006-2007	6			Leased locomotive
Traxx	E186		Freight	Bo'Bo'	Bombardier Transportation	2006-2020	84			Owned by Germany, certified for operation in Poland, 11 examples owned by Poland
Traxx	386		Freight	Bo'Bo'	Bombardier Transportation	2014-2018	40			Owned by the Czech Republic, certified for operation in Poland
Traxx	188		Freight	Bo'Bo'	Alstom	2018 2022-2023	11			Owned by Germany, certified for operation in Poland
Traxx	388		Mixed traffic	Bo'Bo'	Alstom	2019-2025	55			Owned by the Czech Republic, certified for operation in Poland, 4 examples owned by Poland
Eurosprinter	EU45		Mixed traffic	Bo'Bo'	Siemens Mobility	2009-2011	9			Leased locomotive, 1 owned by PKP Cargo
Eurosprinter	E189		Mixed traffic	Bo'Bo'	Siemens Mobility	2004-2011	50			Owned by Germany, certified for operation in Poland, 9 examples owned by Poland
Eurosprinter	ES64F4		Freight	Bo'Bo'	Siemens Mobility	2010 2011	4			Owned by Germany, certified for operation in Poland
Eurosprinter	189		Freight	Bo'Bo'	Siemens Mobility	2003-2004	32			Owned by Germany, certified for operation in Poland
Eurosprinter	1216		Mixed traffic	Bo'Bo'	Siemens Mobility	2007-2010	5			Owned by the Czech Republic, certified for operation in Poland
Eurosprinter	EU44		Passenger	Bo'Bo'	Siemens Mobility	2008-2010	10		Husarz (Hussar)	
Vectron	193/6193		Mixed traffic	Bo'Bo'	Siemens Mobility	From 2010	289		Vectron	46 examples owned by Poland, the rest owned by foreign countries
Vectron	EU46		Mixed traffic	Bo'Bo'	Siemens Mobility	2015-2023	25		Vectron	
Vectron	383		Freight	Bo'Bo'	Siemens Mobility	2016-2025	108		Vectron	Owned by the Czech Republic and Slovakia, certified for operation in Poland
Vectron	471		Freight	Bo'Bo'	Siemens Mobility	2017	3		Vectron	Owned by Hungary, certified for operation in Poland
Vectron	1293		Mixed traffic	Bo'Bo'	Siemens Mobility	2018-2025	95		Vectron	Owned by Austria, 3 by the Czech Republic, certified for operation in Poland
Newag Dragon	ET43		Freight	Co'Co'	Newag	2020-2022	24			
Newag Dragon	E6MST		Freight	Co'Co'	Newag	From 2025	14			
Newag Griffin	E4MSU		Mixed traffic	Bo'Bo'	Newag	2012	1		Gryfin (Griffin)	
Newag Griffin	EU200		Passenger	Bo'Bo'	Newag	From 2023	19		Gryfin (Griffin)	

==== Other system locomotives ====
Locomotive type/class	Image	Traffic	Electric system	UIC class	Manufacturer	Build date	Quantity used	Years retired	Nicknames	Notes
EU40		Mixed traffic	1 kV DC	Bo'	AEG	1913	1	1959		
EU41		Mixed traffic	470 V DC	Bo'	Beuchelt & Co.		1	1959		
AEG battery locomotive		Depot shunting	250 V	Bo	AEG	1928	1			Battery electric locomotive
EL2		Freight	1,2/2,4 kV DC	Bo'Bo'	LEW Henningsdorf	1958–1987	62	2026	Krokodyl (Crocodile)	
EL4		Midweight shunting	600 V DC 750 or 1200 V DC	Bo	LEW Henningsdorf	1954–1960	12			
EL16		Depot shunting	110 V	Bo	LEW Henningsdorf	1966–1990	132			Battery electric locomotive
EPA42		Midweight shunting		Bo'Bo'	ZNTK Nowy Sącz	1985	1	1996		SM42 rebuild into a battery electric locomotive
ZARMEN MLK		Heavy shunting		Bo'Bo'	ZARMEN	2015	1			Battery electric locomotive prototype

=== Electric multiple units ===
==== 3 kV DC multiple units ====
Blue row = Operated abroad and certified for operation in Poland

Multiple unit type/class		Image	Traffic	UIC class	Manufacturer	Build date	Quantity used	Years retired	Nicknames	Notes
EW51			Suburban	Bo'Bo'+2'2'2'	Lilpop	1936–1938	70	1970s		
EW54			Suburban	2'2'+Bo'Bo'+2'2'	ASEA	1950–1952	44	1970s		
EW52			Suburban	Bo'Bo'+2'2'2' (2'2'+2'2')	Waggonbau Görlitz	1954	10	1970s		
EW53			Suburban	2'2'+Bo'Bo'+2'2'	Pafawag	1954–1956	20	1985		
EN56			Local	2'2'+Bo'Bo'+2'2'	Waggonbau Görlitz	1955–1957	36	1970s–1980s		
ED70			Long-range	Bo'Bo'+2'2'+2'2'+Bo'Bo'	Waggonbau Görlitz	1957	2	1977		
EW55			Suburban	2'2'+Bo'Bo'+2'2'	Pafawag	1958–1962	72	1990s		
EN57	5B/6B		Local	2'2'+Bo'Bo'+2'2'	Pafawag	1962–1991	1412		Kibel (Toilet), ENdolino	
EN57	5Bd/6Bd		Suburban	2'2'+Bo'Bo'+2'2'	Pafawag	1973	1		Kibel (Toilet)	
EN57	5Bo/6Bo		Local	2'2'+Bo'Bo'+2'2'	Pafawag	1988	3		Kibel (Toilet)	Equipped with Impulse starter
EN57	5Bp/6Bp		Local	2'2'+Bo'Bo'+2'2'	Pafawag	1990–1993	54		Kibel (Toilet)	Modified design
EN57	EN57 (SPOT)		Local	2'2'+Bo'Bo'+2'2'	ZNTK Mińsk Mazowiecki Newag Pesa	2006-2007	75		Kibel (Toilet)	EN57 modernization
EN57	EN57-3001, 3002		Local	2'2'+Bo'Bo'+2'2'	ZNTK Mińsk Mazowiecki	2008	2			Yugoslavian EN57 modernization
EN57	EN57KM		Local	2'2'+Bo'Bo'+2'2'	ZNTK Mińsk Mazowiecki	2007-2008	9			EN57 modernization
EN57	EN57AKM		Local	2'2'+Bo'Bo'+2'2'	Newag ZNTK Mińsk Mazowiecki	2009-2011	33			EN57 modernization
EN57	EN57AKM		Local	2'2'+Bo'Bo'+2'2'	ZNTK Mińsk Mazowiecki	2010-2011	3		Turbokibel (Turbotoilet)	Yugoslavian EN57 modernization
EN57	EN57AKM (Second series)		Local	2'2'+Bo'Bo'+2'2'	Newag ZNTK Mińsk Mazowiecki	2013	34		Turbokibel (Turbotoilet)	EN57 modernization
EN57	EN57AKM (SKMT)		Suburban	2'2'+Bo'Bo'+2'2'	ZNTK Mińsk Mazowiecki	2014	21		Turbokibel (Turbotoilet)	EN57 modernization
EN57	EN57AL		Local	2'2'+Bo'Bo'+2'2'	ZNTK Mińsk Mazowiecki	2011	5			Yugoslavian EN57 modernization
EN57	EN57AL (2011 design)		Local	2'2'+Bo'Bo'+2'2'	ZNTK Mińsk Mazowiecki	2011-2014	14		Alicja (Alice)	EN57 modernization
EN57	EN57AL (2013 design)		Local	2'2'+Bo'Bo'+2'2'	ZNTK Mińsk Mazowiecki	2013-2017	116		Alicja (Alice)	EN57 modernization
EN57	EN57ALc		Local	2'2'+Bo'Bo'+2'2'	ZNTK Mińsk Mazowiecki	2017-2018	14		Alicja (Alice)	EN57 modernization
EN57	EN57ALd		Local	2'2'+Bo'Bo'+2'2'	ZNTK Mińsk Mazowiecki	2017-2018	23		Alicja (Alice)	EN57 modernization
EN57	EN57 (AKŁ, AKW)		Local	2'2'+Bo'Bo'+2'2'	Newag	2011-2015	11		Turbokibel (Turbotoilet)	EN57 modernization
EN57	EN57 (AKS)		Local	2'2'+Bo'Bo'+2'2'	Newag ZNLE	2011-2012	6		Turbokibel (Turbotoilet)	EN57 modernization
EN57	EN57-892 (AKS)		Local	2'2'+Bo'Bo'+2'2'	Newag	2013	1		Turbokibel (Turbotoilet)	EN57 modernization
EN57	EN57AKD		Local	2'2'+Bo'Bo'+2'2'	Newag	2013	1		Turbokibel (Turbotoilet)	EN57 modernization
EN57	EN57AP		Local	2'2'+Bo'Bo'+2'2'	Newag	2014	3		Turbokibel (Turbotoilet)	EN57 modernization
EN57	EN57FPS		Local	2'2'+Bo'Bo'+2'2'	H. Cegielski	2017-2018	20			EN57 modernization
EW58			Suburban	Bo'Bo'+2'2'+Bo'Bo'	Pafawag	1974–1980	28	2012		
EN71	5Bh/6Bh		Local	2'2'+Bo'Bo'+Bo'Bo'+2'2'	Pafawag ZNTK	1976-2011	52		Kibel (Toilet)	32 examples rebuilt by ZNTK in 1976 – 2011 are EN57 designs, actual EN71 design built in 1976
EN71	EN71-045		Suburban	2'2'+Bo'Bo'+Bo'Bo'+2'2'	Newag	2009	1			EN71 modernization
EN71	EN71KM		Local	2'2'+Bo'Bo'+Bo'Bo'+2'2'	ZNTK Mińsk Mazowiecki	2010 2015	5			EN71 modernization
EN71	EN71AKS		Local	2'2'+Bo'Bo'+Bo'Bo'+2'2'	Newag	2012	2			EN71 modernization
EW60	6WE		Suburban	2'2'+Bo'Bo'+2'2'	Pafawag	1990	2			
EW60	6WEb		Suburban	2'2'+Bo'Bo'+2'2'	ZNTK Mińsk Mazowiecki	2007-2013	2			EW60 modernization
ED72	5Bs/6Bs		Long-range	2'2'+Bo'Bo'+Bo'Bo'+2'2'	Pafawag	1993–1996	21	2020s		
ED72	ED72A		Long-range	2'2'+Bo'Bo'+Bo'Bo'+2'2'	ZNTK Mińsk Mazowiecki	2011	2			ED72 moderniztion
ED72	ED72A		Long-range	2'2'+Bo'Bo'+Bo'Bo'+2'2'	ZNTK Mińsk Mazowiecki	2012-2013	4			ED72 modernization
ED72	ED72Ac		Long-range	2'2'+Bo'Bo'+Bo'Bo'+2'2'	ZNTK Mińsk Mazowiecki	2018	6			ED72 modernization
ED73			Long-range	2'2'+Bo'Bo'+Bo'Bo'+2'2'	Pafawag	1997	1	2012		
Newag 14WE	14WE		Local	2'2'+Bo'Bo'+2'2'	Newag	2005-2007	8		Kaczokibel (Duck toilet)	
Newag 14WE	EN61		Local	2'2'+Bo'Bo'+2'2'	Newag	2006	1		Pociąg Papieski (Pope Train)	
EN81			Local	Bo'2'	Pesa	2005-2007	8			
ED59			Long-range	Bo'2'2'Bo'	Pesa	2006	1	2016	Acatus (Boat)	ED74 prototype
ED74			Long-range	Bo'2'2'2'Bo'	Pesa	2007-2008	14		Bydgostia	
Stadler Flirt	EN75		Local	Bo'2'2'2'Bo'	Stadler	2008	4			
Stadler Flirt	ER75		Suburban	Bo'2'2'2'Bo'	Stadler	2008	10			
Stadler Flirt	480		Long-range	Bo'2'2'2'2'Bo'	Stadler	2012	5			Owned by the Czech Republic, certified for operation in southern Poland
Stadler Flirt II	L-4268		Local	Bo'2'Bo'	Stadler	2014-2015	20			
Stadler Flirt II	ED160		Long-range	Bo'2'2'2'2'+2'2'2'2'Bo'	Stadler	2015	20			
Stadler Flirt II	ER160		Suburban	Bo'2'2'2'2'Bo'	Stadler	2019-2023	61			
19WE			Suburban	Bo'Bo'+2'2'+2'2'+Bo'Bo'	Newag	2010	4			
EN77			Local	Bo'2'2'2'Bo'	Pesa	2010-2011	5		Acatus (Boat)	
Pesa Acatus Plus	EN99		Local	Bo'2'Bo'	Pesa	2014-2015	4		Acatus (Boat)	EN77 development
Pesa Acatus Plus	EN64		Local	Bo'2'2'Bo'	Pesa	2014-2016	9		Acatus (Boat)	EN77 development
Pesa Elf	EN76		Local	Bo'2'2'2'Bo'	Pesa	2011	9		Elf	Used by Silesian Railways
Pesa Elf	EN76		Local	Bo'2'2'2'Bo'	Pesa	2011	16		Elf	Used by Koleje Mazowieckie
Pesa Elf	EN76		Local	Bo'2'2'2'Bo'	Pesa	2012-2014	22		Elf	Used by Greater Poland Railways
Pesa Elf	EN76		Local	Bo'2'Bo'2'2'	Pesa	2014-2016	6		Elf	Used in Kuyavian-Pomeranian Voivodeship
Pesa Elf	27WE		Suburban	Bo'2'Bo'2'Bo'2'Bo'	Pesa	2011	13		Elf	
Pesa Elf	27WEb		Local	Bo'2'2'Bo'+2'2'2'Bo'	Pesa	2012-2013	6		Elf	
Pesa Elf	EN96		Local	Bo'2'Bo'	Pesa	2011	4		Elf	
Pesa Elf	EN62		Local	Bo'2'2'Bo'	Pesa	2012	1		Elf	
Pesa Elf II	21WEa		Local	Bo'2'2'Bo'	Pesa	2017 2020	5		Elf	
Pesa Elf II	22WEd		Local	Bo'2'2'2'Bo'	Pesa	2017-2019	12		Elf	
Pesa Elf II	22WEg		Local	Bo'2'2'2'Bo'	Pesa	2019-2021	5		Elf	
Pesa Elf II	34WEa		Local	Bo'2'Bo'	Pesa	2017-2018	4		Elf	
Pesa Elf II	48WE		Local	Bo'2'2'2'2'Bo'	Pesa	2019-2020	10		Elf	
Pesa Elf II	48WEb		Local	Bo'2'2'2'2'Bo'	Pesa	2020-2021	5		Elf	
Pesa Elf II	48WEc		Local	Bo'2'2'2'2'Bo'	Pesa	2021-2026	34		Elf	
Pesa Elf II	48WEd		Local	Bo'2'2'2'2'Bo'	Pesa	2025	4		Elf	
Pesa Elf II	EN62A		Local	Bo'2'2'Bo'	Pesa	2017-2018	5		Elf	
Pesa Elf II	EN76A		Local	Bo'2'2'2'Bo'	Pesa	2018	2		Elf	
Pesa Elf II	EN76B		Local	Bo'2'2'2'Bo'	Pesa	2020-2021	4		Elf	
Pesa Elf II	EN96A		Local	Bo'2'Bo'	Pesa	2017-2018	4		Elf	
Newag Impuls	31WE		Local	Bo'2'2'2'Bo'	Newag	2012-2017	23		Impuls	
Newag Impuls	35WE		Local	Bo'2'2'2'+2'2'2'Bo'	Newag	2012-2013	10		Impuls	
Newag Impuls	EN63		Local	Bo'2'2'Bo'	Newag	2013	1		Impuls	
Newag Impuls	36WEa		Local	Bo'2'2'Bo	Newag	2014-2017	26		Impuls	
Newag Impuls	45WE		Local	Bo'2'2'2'2'Bo'	Newag	2015-2017	28		Impuls	
Newag Impuls	ED78		Long-range	Bo'2'2'2'Bo'	Newag	2013-2018	30		Impuls	
Newag Impuls	EN63A		Local	Bo'2'2'Bo'	Newag	2014-2018	41		Impuls	
Newag Impuls	EN78		Local	Bo'2'2'2'Bo	Newag	2016-2018	8		Impuls	
Newag Impuls	EN79		Local	Bo'2'2'2'2'Bo'	Newag	2016-2017	5		Impuls	
Newag Impuls	EN90		Local	Bo'2'2'2'2'Bo'	Newag	2018-2020	10		Impuls	
Newag Impuls	EN98		Local	Bo'2'Bo'	Newag	2014	3		Impuls	
Newag Impuls II	36WEd		Local	Bo'2'2'Bo'	Newag	2018-2019	14		Impuls	
Newag Impuls II	EN63B		Local	Bo'2'2'Bo'	Newag	2020	8		Impuls	
Newag Impuls II	31WEb		Local	Bo'2'2'2'Bo'	Newag	2021	1		Impuls	
Newag Impuls II	EN78A		Local	Bo'2'2'2'Bo'	Newag	2021	9		Impuls	
Newag Impuls II	EN98A		Local	Bo'2'Bo'	Newag	2021	9		Impuls	
Newag Impuls II	31WEba		Suburban	Bo'2'2'2'Bo'	Newag	2021-2022	6		Impuls	
Newag Impuls II	45WEa		Suburban	Bo'2'2'2'2'Bo'	Newag	2021-2022	15		Impuls	
Newag Impuls II	31WEbb		Local	Bo'2'2'2'Bo'	Newag	2023-2025	37		Impuls	
Newag Impuls II	58WE		Local		Newag	2024-2026	14		Impuls	
Newag Impuls II	31WEbc		Local	Bo'2'2'2'Bo'	Newag	2025-2026	11		Impuls	
ED250			Long-range	(1A)'(A1)'+(1A)'(A1)'+2'2'+2'2'+2'2'+(1A)'(A1)'+(1A)'(A1)'	Alstom	2013-2015	20		Dziobak (Platypus), Pendolino	
ED161			Long-Range	Bo'2'Bo'2'2'2'2'2'Bo'	Pesa	2015-2016	20		Dart	

==== Other system multiple units ====
Multiple unit type/class	Image	Traffic	Electric system	UIC class	Manufacturer	Build date	Quantity used	Years retired	Notes
Wąbrzeźno railway No. 1 and 2		Suburban	470 kV DC	Bo	Beuchelt & Co.	1898	2	1959	Used in Wąbrzeźno railway
EN 92 799		Suburban	1 kV DC	Bo	HAWA	1914	1	1959	Used in Walim railway
Wittfeld		Local	350 V DC	2A+A2	Various	1908–1913	20	1955	Battery electric multiple unit
EW90		Suburban	800 V DC	Bo'Bo'+2'2'	AEG O&K Siemens WUMAG	1928–1932	54	1976	
EW91EW92		Suburban	800 V DC	Bo'Bo'+2'2'	AEG O&K Siemens	1938–1941	26	1976	20 EW91 were used, 6 EW92 were used
EN80		Suburban	650 V DC	Bo'Bo'	English Electric	1927	20	1972	
EN94		Suburban	600 V DC	Bo'2'Bo'	Pafawag	1968 1971–1972	40	2010s	
EN95		Suburban	(600 V) 3 kV DC	Bo'2'2'2'Bo'	Pesa	2004	1	2020	
EN97		Suburban	(600 V) 3 kV DC	Bo'2'Bo'+Bo'2'Bo'	Pesa	2011-2012	14		
EN100		Suburban	3 kV DC	Bo'2'Bo'+Bo'2'Bo'	Newag	2016	6		

== Dual traction stock ==
=== Dual traction locomotives ===
Locomotive type/class		Image	Traffic	UIC class	Manufacturer	Build date	Quantity used	Years retired	Nicknames	Notes
Newag Dragon	E6ACTadb		Freight	Co'Co'	Newag	2020-2022	8			
Newag Dragon	E6ACTadnb		Freight	Co'Co'	Newag	2025	30			
Pesa Gama	111Ed		Mixed traffic	Bo'Bo'	Pesa	2012-2025	107			
Pesa Gama	111DE		Mixed traffic	Bo'Bo'	Pesa	2021	1			Not yet in service

=== Dual traction multiple units ===
Locomotive type/class		Image	Traffic	UIC class	Manufacturer	Build date	Quantity used	Years retired	Nicknames	Notes
Newag Impuls	EN63H		Local	Bo'2'2'Bo'	Newag	2020-2022	12		Impuls	
Newag Impuls	36WEh		Local	Bo'2'2'Bo'	Newag	2020-2022	13		Impuls	
Newag Impuls	36WEha		Local	Bo'2'2'Bo'	Newag	2022	5		Impuls	
Newag Impuls	36WEhb		Local	Bo'2'2'Bo'	Newag	2023-2024	8		Impuls	
Newag Impuls	36WEhd		Local	Bo'2'2'Bo'	Newag	2020	2		Impuls	
FPS Plus	227M		Local		H. Cegielski	2020	1			
FPS Plus	228M		Local		H. Cegielski	2024	1			

== Other stock ==
=== Tested stock ===
Locomotive type/class		Image	Transmission	Traffic	UIC class	Manufacturer	Year leased	Quantity tested	Year returned
ÖBB Class 2020			Diesel-hydraulic	Mixed traffic	B'B'	SGP	1961	1	
Gravita	261		Diesel-hydraulic	Heavy shunting, Freight	Bo'Bo'	Voith	2011	2	2012 2013
Gravita	260		Diesel-hydraulic	Heavy shunting, Freight	Bo'Bo'	Voith	2012	1	2013
TE33A			Diesel-electric	Freight	Co'Co'	General Electric	2015	1	2015

=== Non-rail stock ===
Vehicle	Image	Vehicle type	Use	Fuel type	Manufacturer	Build date	Owners	Notes
FSO Warszawa		Sedan, Pickup	Railway inspections	Gasoline	Fabryka Samochodów Osobowych	1956–1973	Various railway associations	Used as a railway draisine
Fiat 126p		City car		Gasoline	Fabryka Samochodów Małolitrażowych, Fiat Auto Poland	1970s–1980s	Various railway associations	
Liebherr A900ZW		Excavator	Railway construction and maintenance	Diesel	Liebherr	2005	DOLKOM	
ATLAS 1404ZW		Excavator	Railway construction and maintenance	Diesel	ATLAS GmbH	2013-2019	DOLKOM	
ATLAS 1604ZW		Excavator	Railway construction and maintenance	Diesel	ATLAS GmbH	2014-2019	DOLKOM	
Orion 9C160		Tractor	Shunting	Diesel	Crystal Tractor		Various industrial companies and depots	

== See also ==
- Rail transport in Poland
- Armoured trains of Poland
