= Białystok railway station =

Railway station in Białystok, Poland

Białystok
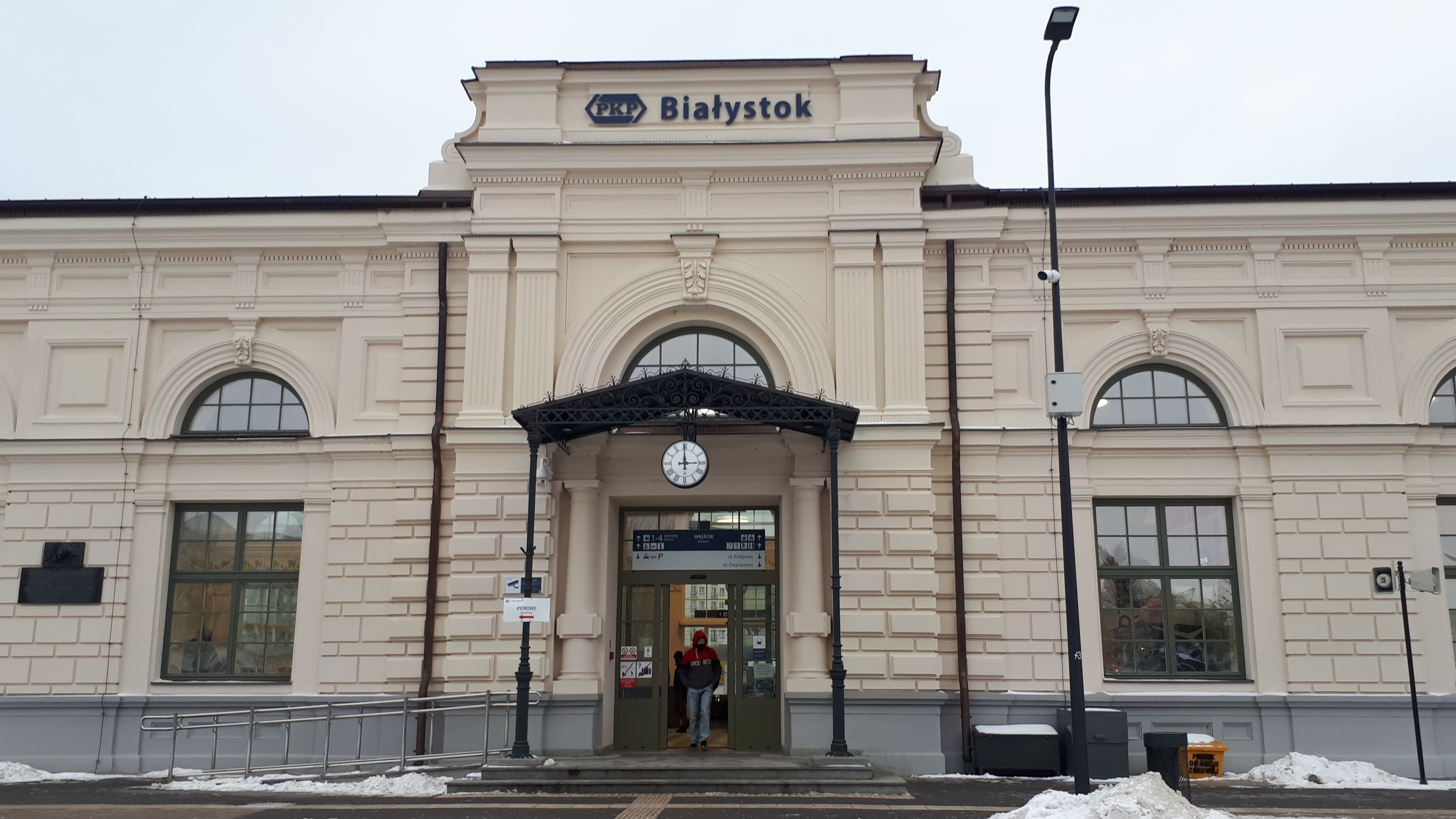
- Białystok railway station, January 2022

General information
- Location: Białystok, Podlaskie Voivodeship; Poland
- Coordinates: 53°08′04″N 23°08′08″E
- System: B
- Owner: Polskie Koleje Państwowe S.A.
- Platforms: 4

History
- Opened: 1861
- Former names: Białystok stacja kolejowa
Location
- Location within Poland Location within Europe

Białystok railway station is the most important railway station in the city of Białystok, Poland. It is sometimes referred to as Białystok Central (Białystok Centralny), to distinguish it from six other, much smaller, stations located in the city.

== History ==
The station building was built during the creation of the Saint Petersburg–Warsaw Railway in 1861 in the classical style. The first passenger train, covering the entire route from Warsaw to Saint Petersburg, arrived in Bialystok in September 1862. The increasing number of transports at the end of the 19th century led to expansion of the station. During World War I, the building was burned by retreating Russian troops. After the war, the station was rebuilt.

During World War II, the station was bombed.

In the local engine house in August 1977, locomotives of the OKl27, Ol49, Ty2, Ty45 and Pt47 series were stationed.

In 1989, PKP began modernizing the station, which lasted 14 years. The renovated station building was officially opened on November 28, 2003. According to the Gazeta Wyborcza ranking of 2008, the PKP railway station in Bialystok was considered the most beautiful station in Poland, second came Lublin and third in Częstochowa. The building in Białystok received 71 points out of 100 possible. Also in 2008 and 2012, Gazeta Wyborcza gave it top place in the ranking of 23 most significant Polish railway stations in 2008 and 2012. The station passed major renovation from November 2018 to June 2020 by Budimex. The biggest challenge was underground work, some of which was carried out in the white bathtub technology. Very carefully it was necessary to demolish the entresol with an area of about 300 sq m, located in the main hall of the historic station. To avoid possible damage to the structures of historic walls. The works were carried out in small stages, by cutting off individual elements together with their fragmentation and removal from the object. Since January 2022 due to Rail Baltica, the station is undergoing another renovation, the platforms are being completely replaced, a platform roof and underground passages have been built.

== Services ==
The station provides connections to all the major cities of Poland, including Warsaw, Gdańsk, Katowice, Kraków, Łódź Kaliska, Poznań, Wrocław, and Szczecin. There are also connections to Vilnius, Lithuania, via Kaunas.

== See also ==
- Saint Petersburg–Warsaw Railway
- Rail Baltica
