= PKP class Pt47 =

Polish express steam locomotive

Pt47
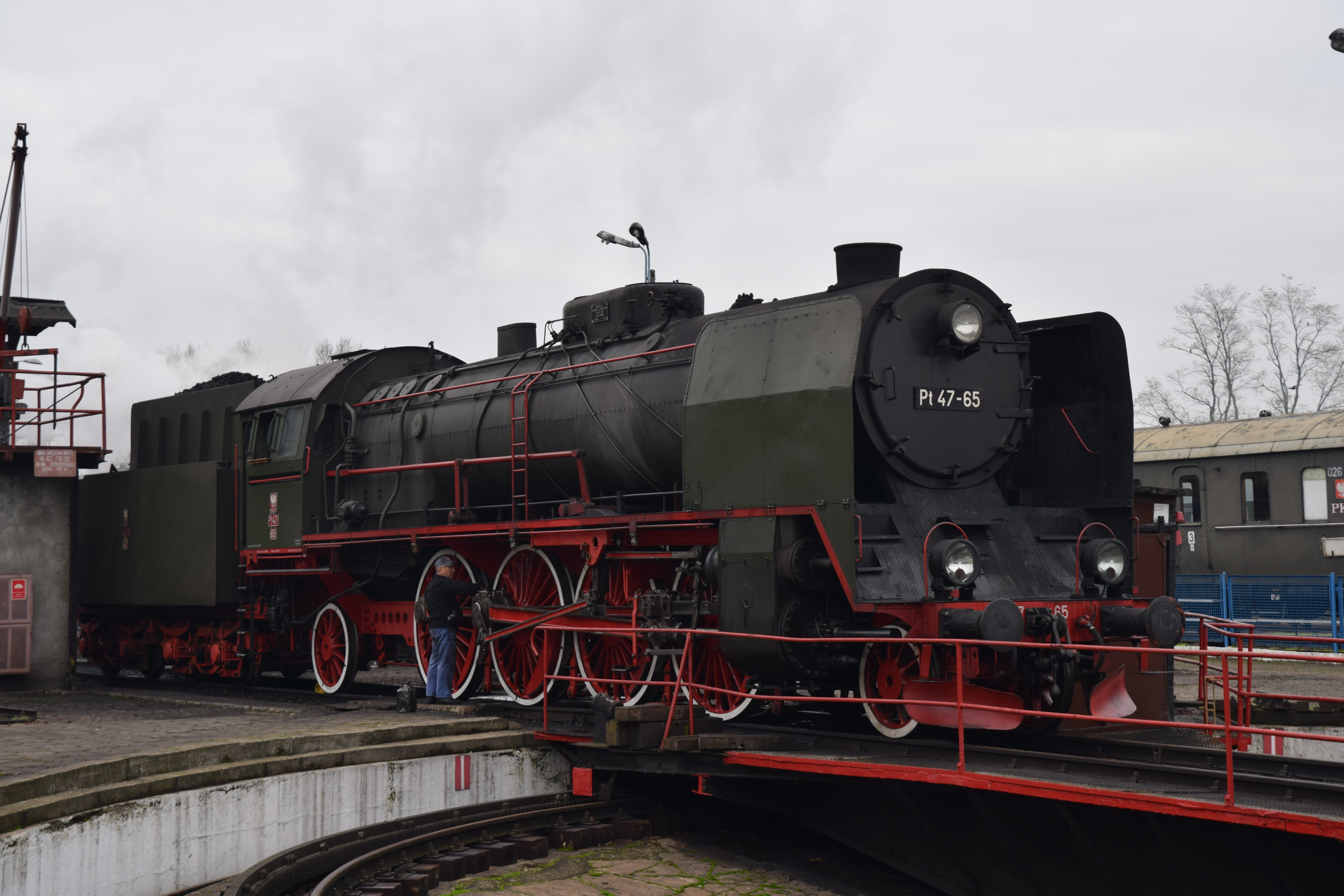
- Pt47-65 preserved by Wolsztyn Locomotive Roundhouse in Wolsztyn in 2017
Type and origin
- Power type: Steam
- Builder: Fablok (120) 1–100, 161–180; Cegielski (60) 101–160
- Build date: 1948–1951
- Total produced: 180
Specifications
- Configuration
  - Whyte: 2-8-2
  - UIC: 1′D1′ h2
- Gauge: 1,435 mm (4 ft 8 1/2 in) standard gauge
- Leading dia.: 1,000 mm (39.37 in)
- Driver dia.: 1,850 mm (72.83 in)
- Trailing dia.: 1,200 mm (47.24 in)
- Tender wheels: 1,000 mm (39.37 in)
- Minimum curve: 150 m (492 ft 2 in)
- Length: 24.255 m (79 ft 7 in)
- Axle load: 18.0 tonnes (17.7 long tons; 19.8 short tons)
- Adhesive weight: 83.2 tonnes (81.9 long tons; 91.7 short tons)
- Loco weight: 104.2 tonnes (102.6 long tons; 114.9 short tons)
- Tender weight: 77.9 tonnes
- Total weight: 182.1 tonnes (179.2 long tons; 200.7 short tons)
- Tender type: 33D48
- Fuel type: Coal
- Water cap.: 33 m^{3} (1,200 cu ft)
- Tender cap.: 17.0 tonnes (16.7 long tons; 18.7 short tons)
- Firebox
  - Grate area: 4.5 m^{2} (48 sq ft)
- Boiler pressure: 15 kg/cm^{2} (1.47 MPa; 213 psi)
- Heating surface
  - Firebox: 19.8 m^{2} (213 sq ft)
  - Total surface: 239.2 m^{2} (2,575 sq ft)
- Superheater
  - Heating area: 99 m^{2} (1,070 sq ft)
- Cylinders: Two, outside
- Cylinder size: 630 mm × 700 mm (24.80 in × 27.56 in)
Performance figures
- Maximum speed: 110 km/h (68 mph)
- Power output: 2,000 hp (1,500 kW)
- Tractive effort: 13,500 kgf (29,760 lbf)
Career
- Operators: PKP
- Class: Pt47
- Numbers: 1–180
- Nicknames: Petucha; Pyta
- Locale: Poland; Austria
- Last run: 30 October 1988
- Retired: 1973–1988
- Disposition: 17 preserved, remainder scrapped

PKP Class Pt47 is a Polish 2-8-2 express steam locomotive, built for hauling express trains in Poland. The locomotive was designed in 1947 and was built between 1948 and 1951 by Fablok in Chrzanów, then by H. Cegielski in Poznań, producing in total 180 locomotives (120 by Fablok and 60 by H. Cegielski). Pt47 is an improvement of the successful pre-war PKP class Pt31 class, the main difference is the addition of circular tubes in the fire chamber, thereby significantly increased boiler performance. This class also featured a superheater and many have mechanical stokers to feed coal into the firebox.

== History ==
=== Before the war ===
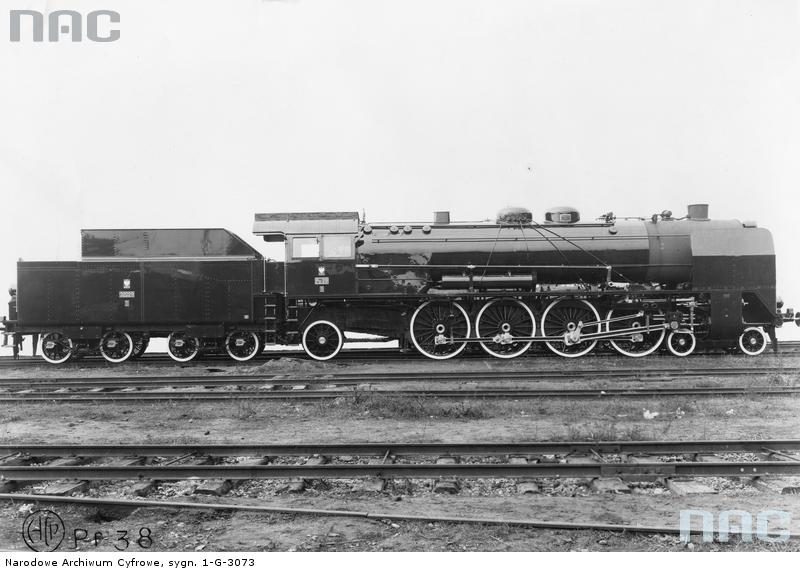
PKP class Pu29

The number of freight and passenger trains was steadily increasing in the 1920s. The passenger steam locomotives of the Ok1, Ok22 and the express Pk1 class, were not able to cope with the weight of heavy transit trains from Berlin to the capital of East Prussia – Königsberg, especially on the demanding Chojnice - Tczew - Malbork route. In the second half of the second decade in the 20th century, the Ministry of Transport decided to build two prototypes of heavy express steam locomotives with four driving axles designated Pu29. The trial run of the Pu29-1 prototype took place on 9 September 1931, and alongside its service in the first few months, it showed very good performance. Despite this, the locomotive was too long and heavy for the needs of Polish railways, and wasn't able to fit into turntables, which led to abandoning the production of the class, and develop a new locomotive design. The second design was to be designated Pt29 and was developed under the direction of the young engineer, Kazimierz Zembrzuski, with supervision from Professor Xiężopolski. On 5 October 1932, Fablok conducted the trial run of PKP class Pt31 locomotive with a train weighing 660 tons on the Strzemieszyce - Skarżysko-Kamienna route. The locomotive, like the Pu29, demonstrated very good performance during subsequent operation. The locomotive's length allowed to fit on most turntables available in the main engine sheds while having less weight and having similar performance, which tipped the decision to choose the design built at Fablok.

=== Design ===
The situation regarding the number of heavy express locomotives was difficult, most of the locomotives were severely damaged from the war.

On 7 February 1947, in a difficult economic situation, a conference took place at the Mechanical Department of the Ministry of Communication regarding the construction of standardized locomotives for PKP. Professor Xiężopolski supported starting production of the modernized pre-war designs to give time for developing new solutions. Following this idea, on 10 April 1947, professors Albert Czeczott and Antoni Xiężopolski gave a positive opinion on the projects for the Ty45 class locomotives, which was the development of the pre-war Ty37 class, and the Pt47 class locomotive, which was an evolution of the pre-war Pt31 class modernized by the Central Design Office in Poznań. The modernization of the design documentation for the Pt47 class was handled by the Central Design Bureau of the Railway Rolling Stock Industry in Poznań.

In the new locomotive class, many differences were introduced compared to the original Pt31 class, including:

- Using the steel firebox instead of a copper firebox, where the side copper stays were replaced with steel stays, and the introduction of the hinged stays,
- Installing the circulation pipes of the firebox in a quantity of three, on which the arch was supported,
- Adding two flame tubes, which allowed for the use of 40 elements of the superheater instead of 38. As a result of the changes, the superheater surface area increased by 8 m^{2}, and the boiler increased its heating surface by 5 m^{2},
- Increasing the number of cleaning openings of the support,
- Changine the fittings with valves, including the main steam receiver,
- Using a shaking grate,
- Removing the central latch in the form of a knob in the center in the smoke box door,
- Installing a steam collector on the boiler barrel at the first barrel course, shortening the connecting pipe, where its insulation formed a unified structure together with the sand box,
- Using a closed cab,
- Changing the shape and height of the smoke deflectors, and abandoning the characteristic upper edge bevel of the Pt31 on the side facing the front of the locomotive,
- The locomotive frames being made from a single element, which became a no longer need for manufacturing from two elements and join them under the boiler supports, which was possible in the post-war industry,
- Changing the construction of the ashpan along with its flaps,
- Reducing the locomotive's weight by about 2 tons, thanks to the widespread introduction of welding technology and the replacement of riveting,
- Modifying the construction of the rear bogie of the running gear.
- A new type of standardized sleeve buffers used on locomotives after the war on the PKP.

=== Production ===
In the beginning of 1948, the Ministry of Transport placed orders for the delivery of 135 locomotives by 1949, including 100 for Fablok numbered from 1 to 100, and 35 for Cegielski with numbering from 101 onwards. A year later in 1949, both manufacturers were granted additional orders, for 20 and 25 units, in which the total number of locomotives built could reach 180. The delivery date for the first unit, set for May 1948, proved to be too optimistic, as it soon became apparent, and had to be postponed by three months due both to delays in the preparation of construction documentation and to difficulties faced by the subcontractor, Babcock-Zieleniewski Works, which encountered problems in producing the dies and procuring imported firebox plates. The latter issue turned out to be serious enough that the final delivery plan of 35 locomotives from Fablok by the end of the year was achieved with only 28 units.

In addition to the serious delay in the delivery of locomotives, problems with their quality became apparent, as the first batches deviated from the required technical specifications, and also showed a tendency to delaminate during subsequent operation. In the view of the failure to meet the annual plan, particular importance was attached to the early commissioning of the first unit Pt47-101 by the Cegielski Works in mid-December 1948. This event was given a propagandistic dimension, as an act of the crew to commemorate the Unification Congress of the Workers' Parties, since according to the plan the locomotive was supposed to be ready only by mid-January of the following year. The problems with boiler plates were not the only ones faced in the production process and during the initial period of locomotive operation. For several years, there was an ongoing replacement of cracking driving wheels produced by the Bauerertz Steelworks, which led to prolonged withdrawal from service of several locomotives.

The failure to deliver, or rather not to order on time, the recording speedometers, which were entirely imported from Switzerland, had such effects – the steam locomotives were simply taken from the factories without the equipment.

During the production, no major structural changes were made to the individual batches of locomotives delivered. Minor changes were made to the driver's cab, which was adapted to different types of tenders, and to the use of a three-cylinder compressor (type H11a3) in the later locomotives, which also required reconstructing the smokebox bell. Most of the boilers (140) for the Pt47 locomotives were made by the Babcock-Zieleniewski Works in Sosnowiec, while the rest came from the Cegielski Works. Due to the shortage of spare boilers that gradually made swapping them harder, caused longer repair downtimes, in 1966 the Wrocław ZNTK made two additional welded-design boilers, which differed only slightly in dimensions from the original ones, and these were then installed in the Pt47-93 and Pt47-178 locomotives at ZNTK Bydgoszcz.

=== Tenders ===
The difficult decisions related to the construction of locomotives after the war were the equipping of new locomotives with tenders. A decision was made to adapt the 34D44 tenders, coupled with German locomotives such as DRG Class 03 and 44 (PKP class Pm2 and Ty4), which had open cabs. For this purpose, the old German tenders were sent for repairs, where they were adjusted to the new locomotives. Coal boxes were raised, adapted to closed cabs, and water inlets were modified, which led to the introduction of the new designation 34D48. Despite this temporary solution, there were ongoing shortages of tenders, and the problem of their lack for systematically repaired locomotives returning to service under the PKP as class Pm2 and Ty4 also emerged. Therefore, there were instances of even using barrel-type tenders 30D43, which were originally used with PKP class Ty2 locomotives. Therefore, in order for new steam locomotives not to remain in factories waiting for tender deliveries, they were paired, as in the case of Pt47-125 at HCP with barrel-type tenders, with the intention that they would eventually be replaced during service. It was only the start of production of 33D48 tenders by Pafawag from 1949 that allowed for pairing new locomotives with brand-new factory tenders.

After the decision to use a mechanical coal feeder, the so-called stoker, on Pt47 class locomotives and its systematic installation during scheduled repairs at ZNTK Bydgoszcz in the 1950s, the capacity of the tender water tank was reduced and its designation changed to 27D48. The Pafawag design wasn't free of flaws, as axle bearing failures happened quite often. Between 1974 and 1976, ZNTK Bydgoszcz carried out a modernization of the 33D48 and 27D48 tender trucks by installing roller bearings.

== Design ==
=== Locomotive frame ===
==== Frame construction ====
The supporting structure of the locomotive consists of a beam frame built from two main beams with a thickness of 90 mm (3.5 in). The main beams were made as a single element, unlike in the Pt31 class locomotives, where they were composed of two parts. This was due to the technological limitations of the industry at that time, which resulted in the characteristic grouping of bolts connecting the frame plates under the boiler supports of the locomotive. The main beams of the frame, so-called side frames, were connected by vertical crossbars located behind the first driving axle and under the cylinder rollers, to which a swinging plate supporting the boiler was mounted. Between the steam cylinders of the frame, a crossbar known as the smoke box frame was also located, providing a fixed support for the boiler. Crossbars were also positioned over the front and rear carrying axles. Additionally, the main beams featured upper and lower horizontal crossbars, closing the area between the remaining crossbars almost along the entire length of the frame. The front buffer beam, factory-riveted and made of 20 mm (0.79 in) thick sheet metal, and the tender coupling box also constituted a connection of the frame beams.

The suspension is based on a single type of a leaf spring, referred to in the old nomenclature and design documentation as a load-carrying spring. The lower suspension in the area of the drive units was constructed by forming two independent groups. Through spring hangers and a system of simple and knee levers, the first rolling unit was connected with the first and second drive units, forming the first group, and the third and fourth drive units were connected with the rear rolling unit, forming the second group.

The leading wheel set had guidance through a Krauss-Helmholtz rolling half-bogie with a lateral displacement of the set of 120 mm (4.7 in) to each side, which allowed it to navigate curves with a radius of 150 m (492 ft 2 in). The half-bogie construction is complex, with its main component being a 2,495 mm (98.2 in) long drawbar. One end of it was connected to the first driving wheel at its middle section, and the other to the leading wheel. The half-bogie had two independent return devices. The first, located about halfway along the drawbar, operated using two springs mounted longitudinally on both sides of the drawbar, which exerted pressure on a ⌀120 mm (4.7 in) pin pressed into the lower part of the frame cross-member between the steam cylinders. The second return device was located right at the axle of the trailing wheel, and its design was based on a spring that pressed against the frame beams.

The rear trailing wheel featured guidance through a Bissel pony truck with a lateral swing of 120 mm (4.7 in) to each side, whose construction is decidedly simpler than that of the front pony truck. The adjustment of the pony truck was ensured by a return device installed on the pony truck's drawbar in front of the wheel. It was equipped with a spring, which generated pressure on the frame beams and forced its realignment along the axis of the locomotive.

==== Wheelsets ====
The wheel arrangement of the Pt47 locomotive is 1–4–1, known as Mikado. The locomotive had four driving wheels with a rolling circle diameter of ⌀1,850 mm (6 ft 1 in). The second, third, and fourth driving wheels had no lateral play. The first wheel had axial play in the journal boxes that allowed the axles to move 20 mm (0.79 in) to each side, which, together with the design of the trucks, enabled the locomotive to negotiate curves with a radius of 150 m (492 ft 2 in). The driving wheels had cast wheels with 20 spokes, whose counterweights were located on the opposite side of the drive journal; however, they were not symmetrical, but rotated 7°15'57" to the right when viewed from the side of the wheel, resulting in a displacement of 107.2 mm (4.22 in) on the wheel rim. Counterweights were made initially with a lead-filled mass, and in later stages of production, the counterweights were solid without lead. Axles were also produced in two versions. In the first phase of production, being hollow, they had a hole along the entire length with a diameter of 100 mm (3.9 in), and later they were solid. The hollow axles were intended to lower the temperature through additional ventilation and reduce the unsprung mass of the wheelset. Wheels were positioned relative to each other so that, in the direction of travel, the right crank leads the left by 90°. The wheels were pressed onto the axles using a press, where the proper pressing force should be within the range of 127.5 to 178.7 tonnes (281,000 to 394,000 lb) for oil lubrication. The bare wheels were fitted with rims by mounting the rims hot, with a shrinkage allowance of 1 mm per 1 m (39 in) of diameter, and secured with a clamping ring by rolling the rim immediately after it was mounted on the wheel.

All wheel tires of the wheelset had bolted slides on the inside, which worked directly with the journal flange. This allowed for the replacement of a slide in case the spacing of the slides exceeded the repair dimension without the need to replace the wheel tires. After being pressed onto the axle, the wheels were secured with round and square wedges. The leading wheel had wheel tires with 10 spokes and a rolling circle diameter of ⌀1,000 mm (39 in). The trailing wheel had wheel tires with 12 spokes and a rolling circle diameter of ⌀1,200 mm (47 in). Both sets had hollow axles with a hole along the entire length of the axle with a diameter of ⌀70 mm (2.8 in).

Each wheel assembly had two internal lubrication blocks, which were mounted on the axles using bearings cast with so-called white metal – a bearing alloy. Plain bearings were used in practically all class of locomotives operated on PKP. Serial solutions used on other railways, such as in Czechoslovakia or the GDR, where locomotives with rolling bearings operated, were not applied. Lubrication of the lubrication block was carried out through the top oiler and lubrication channels in the bearing. From below, lubrication was provided by the bottom of the lubrication block and oil pads made of wool, pressed against the axle by springs. Water accumulating in the bottoms was drained through a special drain hole. In addition to lubrication from the oilers, the supply of axial oil was ensured by the central Friedmann oiler.

==== Train collision components ====
The drawbar and buffer devices for the front and rear of the locomotive, i.e., the connections with the tender, were executed in two structural solutions functioning as conceptually similar on most PKP steam locomotives. At the front, the buffer beam houses a towing device with a hook, which since 1951 has been produced in a version with a reinforced hook head. A standard screw coupling was attached to the hook. On the buffer beam, 75 mm (3.0 in) stroke sleeve buffers of a new type were located, later widely used on PKP.

The connection of the tender to the locomotive was implemented through three links, of which the main link in the middle section was made with a cross-section close to square, measuring 100 mm × 80 mm (3.9 in × 3.1 in). It was mounted on the locomotive through a coupling box, which secured its end with a pin 120 mm (4.7 in) in diameter, fastened with a wedge.

Two buffers were installed on the tender, which rested against the prismatic buffer plates of the locomotive, the surfaces of which were lubricated using wick lubricators with lubrication pipes. The tension generated by the buffers made it difficult to withdraw the main coupling pin. For this purpose, special couplings (a turnbuckle) were used to reduce the distance between the locomotive and the tender. One end was mounted on a pin of the tender specially designed for this purpose and on a special hook on the locomotive's coupling box. Two sets of couplings were used to compress the buffers and withdraw the coupling pin. Unfortunately, many abandoned and forgotten locomotives, and even monument locomotives, are incompetently uncoupled by burning through the main coupling rod. This makes it impossible to re-couple it, and manufacturing a new part is costly, as in 2020 the part was valued at approximately 5000 PLN

==== Drive and steam distribution mechanism ====
The Pt47 locomotives used a twin steam engine with an internal steam inlet, equipped with pressure equalizers of the system designed by engineer Kazimierz Tatara and piston slides. This solution was directly adapted from the Pt31 locomotives, and it was also used in the Pu29 locomotives.

The steam cylinders were suspended on both sides of the frame using 10 M46H8 bolts for each cylinder. A cylinder sleeve with a diameter of ⌀630 mm (25 in) was pressed into the cylinder bore. This solution allowed for the replacement of the sleeve in case of damage to the liner, rather than replacing the entire cylinder. At the top of the cylinder, an engineer Tatara pressure equalizer was installed. This device in the body of the equalizer contained two valves that, during operation without steam, would lift and equalize the pressure in the return spaces of the slide chest. This allowed for the installation of fixed slides on the slide rod guided by a ⌀320H9 slide sleeve sealed with felt. The piston rod was guided through bearings on both cylinder covers, which were sealed with a felt ring and a gland consisting of 4 sets of chamber rings. The piston disk had three sealing rings. After assembly, the piston rod was run in with a single-guide crosshead lubricated using a wick lubricator, with the wick made of cotton-wool yarn 1.2 m (3 ft 11 in) in length. Spring-loaded safety valves were installed on the cylinder covers to protect the cylinders from cover blow-off.

A coupling rod 3,800 mm (12 ft 6 in) in length with an I-beam profile was considered rather long for those used in PKP steam locomotives. The front end of the connecting rod was mounted on a pin with a diameter of ⌀120 mm (4.7 in), featuring a split bearing with wedge-screw adjustment. The rear end also has a split bearing with wedge-screw adjustment mounted on a crankpin with a diameter of ⌀180 mm (7.1 in). The upper space between the half-bearings was filled with a lubrication plate measuring 10 mm × 20 mm × 160 mm (0.39 in × 0.79 in × 6.30 in) made of felt. The coupling rod was secured against falling with a bracket attached to the crosshead beam. Additionally, it was equipped with a step to facilitate the operation of the mechanism. The rods also have split bearings adjustable with a wedge, connected together by a joint. The bearings of the coupling rods and rods were equipped with needle lubricators. Only the front end of the coupling rod has a gravity lubricator.

The general layout of the switch stands is typical for post-war machines with a Heusinger mechanism, a suspended slide rod, and a screw return. The adjustment screw was located on the support of the adjustment device attached to the boiler in the driver's cab. The length of the adjustment rod was determined during assembly on the hot boiler, as its length could vary by over 20 mm (0.79 in) depending on the measurement. This was caused by the boiler's expansion due to the heating and the placement of the adjustment device at the end of the boiler. The bearing of the stand shaft and the yoke were positioned on a beam between the crossbars forming the base for the swinging plates. The moving points of the switches are lubricated using various types of lubricators, such as wick and needle types, whose chambers are opened by threaded plugs or valve mushrooms, as well as open lubricators located at points that do not require intense lubrication. The lubrication of the cylinder and the slide box was carried out using lubricators and central lubrication from a grease pump.

=== Boiler ===
The locomotive boilers of Pt47 locomotives for Fablok were built by Babcock-Zieleniewski Works in Sosnowiec. For locomotives built by HCP, some of the boilers came from Sosnowiec, and some were built by HCP. In the first phase of production, the boilers were riveted, and only later was welding introduced on a large scale. The working steam pressure was 15 atmospheres, and the hydraulic test pressure was 20 atmospheres. The total length of the boiler without cladding and smoke box doors is 12,302 mm (40 ft 4.3 in), and the highest height from the support point of the stand to the top of the steam collector is 3,196 mm (10 ft 5.8 in). The chimney is not the highest point of the boiler, as its upper edge from the axis of the boiler is at a distance of 1,340 mm (4 ft 5 in), and the steam collector is 1,441 mm (4 ft 8.7 in) without cladding.

==== Firebox and a boiler stand ====
The firebox was made of steel rather than copper, as was the case in Pt31 locomotives. The sheets of the firebox were 10 mm (0.39 in) thick, except for the side of the fire tubes, which was 15 mm (0.59 in). The vault of the firebox was constructed with a slope toward the rear of the locomotive of 1:53.1. This allowed the locomotive, when running on significant gradients with a low boiler water level, to maintain a minimum water level height along the entire length of the firebox vault. The firebox opening measured 2,784 mm (9 ft 1.6 in) along the longitudinal axis of the locomotive and 1,616 mm (5 ft 3.6 in) along the transverse axis, resulting in a firebox area of 4.5 m^{2}.

The firebox was placed within the boiler stand and connected with a bottom ring at the lower part and a door ring around the door opening, which had a clear dimension of 500 by 360 mm (20 by 14 in), limited by 100 mm (3.9 in) radius at the corners. In addition, the walls of the stand, made of 16 mm (0.63 in) sheet metal, were connected with fixed and movable braces, anchors, and several ties. These, numerous and evenly distributed, were designed to maintain the sheets at equal distances, which, due to temperature changes, worked and led to the breaking of the braces and, consequently, in extreme cases, even to bulging of the firebox sheets. The space between the firebox and the stand formed a water jacket, with a thickness of 100 mm (3.9 in) on the sides and on the side of the door wall, and 120 mm (4.7 in) on the side of the throat wall. According to regulations, the lowest water level from the arch of the firebox was 100 mm (3.9 in).

In order to improve water circulation and enhance boiler efficiency, the firebox was equipped with three seamless circulation pipes ⌀76/64mm, pressed into the firebox walls and welded. For inspection and removal of boiler scale, the stand was equipped with special cleanouts on the door wall, clearly visible in the driver's cab, as well as on the throat wall. Additionally, the pipes served as support for the arch made of fireclay bricks, which was designed to lengthen the flue gas path. In this way, they also protect the connection of the fire tubes to the grate wall from high temperatures and improve the boiler's efficiency.

The firebox was secured with two fusible plugs. Plugs with a 1:8 taper thread were positioned in the ceiling of the firebox. A hole M10 was made along the entire length of the plug, which is filled with an alloy of tin and lead. If the water level falls below the permissible limit due to high temperature, the alloy inside the plug is intended to melt. As a result, the sudden filling of the firebox with water and boiler steam is supposed to extinguish the fire and "inform" the locomotive crew of the situation, preventing further operation of the boiler. This situation is extremely dangerous and, in the case of an incorrect reaction by the locomotive crew, attempting to replenish the boiler water level and start the injector can lead to a boiler explosion.

The total length of the firebox was 2,804 mm (9 ft 2.4 in), and its forward inclination was 1:12.588, which facilitated even feeding of the grate despite its considerable length. The boiler stand was equipped with a single muddrain located at the lowest point of the boiler on the water side, i.e., at the base of the throat wall of the stand. The second muddrain was located on the steam drum.

==== Steam drum ====
The steam drum was made from sheets with a thickness of 18 mm (0.71 in), forming two drums with an outer diameter of ⌀1,872 mm (6 ft 1.7 in) for the first and ⌀1,836 mm (6 ft 0.3 in) for the second. The total length of the drum from the sieve wall to the firebox is 6,100 mm (20 ft 0 in), with the thickness of the sieve wall being as much as 26 mm (1.0 in).

The furnace contains 40 flame tubes with a diameter of ⌀143/134.5 mm and 113 small flame tubes with a diameter of ⌀55/50 mm. The number of flame tubes was greater by 2 units compared to the Pt31 boiler, which allowed for an increase in the heating surface of the boiler by 5 m^{2} and the introduction of additional superheater elements with a surface area of 8 m^{2}. At the bottom of the first drum, a depression was located for the accumulation of boiler sediment and a sludge trap at its base.

==== Smokebox ====
The smokebox were made from a single bell with an external diameter of ⌀1,980 mm (6 ft 6 in), made of 15 mm thick sheet metal. The length from the smoke box door ring to the sieve wall of the boiler barrel is 2,875 mm (9 ft 5.2 in). Along the longitudinal axis of the boiler, on top of the smokebox, there is a chimney with an internal diameter of ⌀595 mm (1 ft 11.4 in) and a height of 350 mm (1 ft 2 in). The opening of the door had a diameter of ⌀1,662 mm (5 ft 5.4 in) and was closed with a door hung on two hinges. The door, following the Pt31 model, did not have a central bolt, but had 8 bolts placed around its perimeter. In the initial phase of operation, the smoke box doors had a stamping, which disappeared over years of operation and locomotive repairs at ZNTK Bydgoszcz. This was due to reducing production costs by decreasing labor intensity. As a result of these actions, rationalizers received awards and joined the ranks of the proud PPR work leaders generating savings.

Inside the smokebox, a steam exhaust cone was located, generating draft during the operation of the steam engine. In the event of the locomotive being stationary, an air blower was supposed to improve the steam production by the boiler. The device, being a pipe surrounding the steam cone and having a dozen or so openings, caused the flow of steam and an artificial draft that carried the exhaust gases through the fire tubes from the firebox to the chimney when the steam supply was opened. The capture of hot pieces of coal and other impurities produced during coal combustion was to be reduced by spark-arresting screens. The soot accumulated in the smokebox was sprayed with water using a dropper.

Deep inside the smokebox, on the blast plate, a Schmidt superheater was installed, whose task was to overheat the saturated steam to a temperature of approximately 400 °C (752 °F) and improve the efficiency of the locomotive. It is also worth mentioning the steam splitter (also called the knife), which was located directly above the steam nozzle cone, with the purpose of directing the steam in a way that directly affects the draught and boiler efficiency. In addition, the smokebox had to be sealed to ensure proper draught. Incorrect adjustment of the splitter and leaks in the smokebox significantly affect the steam production of the boiler. On the left side of the smokebox bell, a recess was provided, creating a space for hanging the air compressor of the locomotive's braking system.

==== Throttle ====
The throttle valve of Pt47 locomotives was located in the steam collector on the first boiler shell, unlike in the Pt31, where the throttle valve was placed on the second shell. This arrangement significantly shortened the length of the communication pipe connecting the throttle valve to the screen wall. The valve was constructed from two discs - a small one and a large one. The two discs allowed for a reduction in the force required to open the valve, which was operated by a lever from the driver's cab; the lever's motion caused the shaft to rotate and further, through another lever, lifted the small disc, followed by the large disc. This ensured that the steam flow regulation, especially during start-up, was smooth and under greater control, which was particularly important when starting with heavy trains.

==== Superheater ====
All post-war construction steam locomotives operated on PKP were already machines using superheated steam. The use of a superheater, in simple terms, allowed for an increase in the power of the steam engine while simultaneously saving fuel – both water and coal. The superheater consists of a superheater box, which is located in the smokebox and installed on its ceiling on the tube sheet wall. It has two chambers for superheated and saturated steam. Saturated steam enters through the throttle valve and a connecting pipe into the saturated steam chamber, from where it passes through the superheater elements into the superheated steam chamber. The superheater elements are pipes routed inside the fire tubes, where the steam is directed through their interior four times, which, depending on the pressure, allows its temperature to be raised twice and the moisture content of the steam to be reduced. The superheated steam from the superheater chamber then travels through two steam inlet pipes to the slide boxes of the steam cylinders. By adding two fire-tubes relative to the locomotive boiler Pt31, the number of superheater elements increased to 40.

==== Central steam receiver ====
The central steam receiver is a set of valves housed within a single body, allowing control of the steam supply to various devices. The receiver was installed in a cab at the top of the stand, and its operation was carried out using knobs. Access for maintenance work was facilitated by an additional hatch in the roof. The central receiver also included a built-in additional shut-off valve, which allowed operation without the need to extinguish the boiler in case the valve gland needed repairs. Each of the valves were served in order from left to right: blower, lighting, grease heater, air pump, and grease sprayer.

==== Safety valve ====
The main element protecting a steam locomotive boiler from an increase in steam pressure above the permissible level is the safety valve. Steam boilers were equipped with two safety valves calibrated to slightly different pressure values. In the event of a sudden pressure increase caused, for example, by closing the throttle after intensive locomotive operation on a gradient with heavily fed grates, or by a locomotive standing idle in the roundhouse, one valve would open. Opening the safety valve causes boiler steam to be released into the atmosphere, and if the pressure continues to rise, the second valve opens. Pt47 locomotives were equipped with two Pop-Coale type safety valves installed one behind the other along the longitudinal axis of the locomotive on the boiler stand.

==== Firebox doors ====
Firebox doors are an extremely important component of the boiler. In Pt47 steam locomotives, factory-installed doors that opened inward to the firebox, based on the Marcotti system, were used. Additionally, they featured air channels, the clearances of which were adjusted with small levers visible on the front wall. In Figure 17, the aforementioned doors are shown, which were nowhere to be found on over 100 locomotives. This was due to the modernization of Pt47 boilers to a mechanical coal feeder, which was installed along with a new door system consisting of double-leaf doors opening to the side.

==== Ashpan ====
The ashpan is located directly under the grate and is connected to the stand. Its construction was reconstructed based on the solution known from Pt31. It was equipped with side air flaps that could be opened from the cab. Often, by opening them while stationary, the remaining slag would be washed out from the interior of the ashpan, which facilitated its emptying. The discharge flaps and their operating levers, were operated from outside the locomotive during servicing on the cleaning pit.

=== Boiler components ===
Thanks to the components that allow maintaining the required water level and verifying its level, as well as a functioning steam whistle without which the locomotive cannot take to the track, the boiler is a fully functional component.

==== Boiler power supply components ====
As a result of the operation of the steam engine, the steam produced by the boiler is consumed, which consequently leads to a decrease in the water level in the boiler. In order to maintain the required water level in locomotive boilers, two types of components were used: piston pumps and injectors. On the Polish State Railways (PKP), the latter became common, with injectors of various designs, divided into two groups, namely for live steam and exhaust steam. The injector, thanks to the nozzle system through which the boiler steam passed, caused the water to move and raised its pressure above the boiler pressure, allowing it to be pumped into the boiler. Factory locomotives Pt47 were equipped with a Metcalf-Friedmann exhaust steam injector on the left side and a Strube live steam suction injector on the right side, which over time was replaced by a Nathan system suction injector.

==== Supply valves ====
The component that directly worked with the injectors was the boiler valve. Each injector had one boiler valve, which in a single casing contained two valves, i.e., a check valve and a shut-off valve. The check valve was closed at all times and would open automatically when fresh water was supplied to the boiler, the pressure of which was higher than the boiler pressure. This pressure difference caused the check valve to open and automatically close when the injector stopped operating. Both the check valves and the injectors were subject to damage; therefore, each supply valve had the ability to cut off the valve, allowing for its safe repair. The Pt47 locomotive boilers had two injectors, each of which had its own boiler valve located on the first ring of the boiler barrel in its upper part.

==== Water level measuring instruments ====
Every boiler approved for operation on PKP had to have two independent water gauge components. The most widespread and least liked were the test cocks, which were quite problematic in operation. Along with them, a tube water gauge was used as the second device. Factory-produced Pt47 locomotives had precisely these two devices: one tube water gauge on the assistant's side, and three test cocks on the driver's side, as was the case with Pt31 locomotives. Over time, all locomotives were equipped with two tube water glasses, which provided greater operational convenience and reliability of the indicated water level. The third component was the most modern Klinger water gauges, but they were never used on boilers installed on Pt47 locomotives.

==== Steam whistle ====
Factory-produced Pt47 locomotives were equipped with a steam whistle typical for locomotives built in Poland, The whistle, mounted on a stand on the boiler directly in front of the front wall of the driver's cab, was operated via a system of levers activated by the locomotive driver. During operation, there were instances of installing multi-ton sirens from locomotives of other series, such as Ty51, where sirens were mounted from number 61 onwards. This measure was implemented by the trained crews to enhance the prestige of their machines. The procedure was not straightforward, as the height of the siren was significantly greater than that of the whistle and required installation along the horizontal axis of the boiler. Additionally, a new lever system had to be constructed, since the original whistle lever system did not generate enough force to open the siren's mushroom valve, whose surface area acting on the boiler steam was larger.

==== Sandbox ====
The sand tank was mounted on the locomotive's main casing just behind the steam collector in a single common housing. It was pneumatically operated from the driver's cab. Pipes supplied sand from the front to the direction of travel for all four drive units. Sand pipes for reverse travel were not installed, as the lower design speed for reverse travel did not allow operation at full speed when handling express trains.

==== Mechanical coal feeder ====
The operation of heavy long-distance trains, where the gross weight of the consist and the scheduled speed were high, required intensive feeding of coal into the firebox. This led to the use of three-person crews composed of an engineer, an assistant, and a stoker, where the latter two often alternated in tending the firebox. Rapidly, as early as the 1950s, mechanical coal feeders, known as stokers, were introduced on Pt47 locomotives. The device had a small steam engine operated by a steam valve from the driver's cab. The engine was located in the locomotive's tender and drove a screw, which, situated in a recess in the bottom of the coal-filled tender, moved the coal to ducts installed on a stand by the boiler under the cab. There, delivered to the so-called station using five individually steam-powered jets, the coal was distributed across the firegrates. The firebox doors were replaced from the Marcet type to dual-swing doors, widely used in Ol49 and Ty51 locomotives.

The component required skill in order to evenly "spread" the coal on the grates. It could not be used while stationary, because the amount of steam used for distributing the coal was too great for the blower to draw it through the fire tubes to the chimney. This could cause the fire to back up and burn the crew. It was also necessary to use higher-quality types of coal that would not block the screw conveyor or cause clinker buildup in the firebox. Despite this, operating the steam locomotive became less burdensome.

The installation, followed by the subsequent dismantling and reinstallation of stokers during the initial major repairs, caused a significant rotation of boilers between locomotives. 107 locomotives used stokers in the following numbers: 1, 2, 3, 5, 6, 8, 9, 12, 15, 16, 17, 19, 20, 22, 24, 25, 26, 27, 28, 29, 30, 31, 33, 35, 36, 42, 43, 44, 46, 48, 49, 52, 55, 56, 59, 60, 61, 62, 65, 66, 69, 70, 71, 72, 73, 75, 76, 77, 78, 79, 80, 81, 84, 85, 86, 87, 89, 91, 93, 94, 95, 96, 97, 98, 99, 100, 103, 106, 107, 113, 114, 115, 116, 117, 118, 119, 120, 124, 129, 132, 133, 135, 142, 143, 144, 145, 149, 151, 153, 154, 155, 158, 159, 160, 161, 163, 164, 165, 166, 168, 170, 173, 174, 175, 176, 177, 179.

=== Locomotive brakes ===
Pt47 locomotives have brakes that, due to its construction, can be divided into two parts – mechanical, generating friction of the brake pads on the wheel rims through the action of the brake lever system, and pneumatic, which provides air pressure to exert force on the brake cylinder piston and act on the brake lever.

==== Mechanical part of the brakes ====
Braking is carried out by brake pads exerting pressure on the rims, increasing friction. The pads are suspended unilaterally at the front of each driving wheel. The hangers at the lower part are connected by a brake triangle, and subsequently, all triangles are connected by brake rods. The last triangle is connected to the brake shaft mounted in the locomotive frame using bushings. Each of them has its own wick lubricator. Above the shaft is a 16" brake cylinder positioned in the vertical axis, which exerts pressure on the shaft lever. The rolling wheel sets are not braked.

The pressure generated by the brake cylinder at 3.5 atmospheres, under normal braking, produces 4,540 kg (10,010 lb). In the case of emergency braking at a pressure of 5 atmospheres, the force increases to 6,475 kg (14,275 lb). As a result, the total pressure on the brake pads during emergency braking amounts to 63.5 t (140,000 lb) for all eight pads. These values pertain to new pads and rims. In the case of worn and already significantly used components, the pressure value increases to 65.3 t (144,000 lb).

In the event of the brake being released and the brake cylinder being purged of air, the retraction of the system is ensured by two brake return springs. It ensures that the brake shaft lever is pulled toward the cylinder, retracting it, and thereby moving the brake pads away from the rim. The handbrake in a screw form is installed on the tender wall regardless of the type of a tender.

==== Pneumatic part of the brakes ====
At the heart of the Westinghouse air brake system is the steam-driven air pump, commonly referred to as a compressor, which on the Pt47 was available in two versions – a three-cylinder H11a3 type and a more efficient four-cylinder H11a4 type. In addition to supplying the brake system with compressed air, the compressor provided air to the flame tube blowers from the firebox side and to operate the sanders. The brake system was based on the Knorr-type main driver's valve, an auxiliary valve, a distributor valve, a pump pressure regulator, a safety valve, two main reservoirs with a capacity of 400 liters, an auxiliary reservoir of 100 liters, and a 14-liter equalizing reservoir.

=== Other components ===
==== Driver's cab ====
Discussions were ongoing at the Ministry of Communications regarding the type of a cab. Ultimately, a closed cab was used, rather than an open one, as was the case in Pt31 locomotives with doors opening inward on both sides. The sliding roof was a solution known on many PKP steam locomotives. Additionally, a hatch was built into the roof to facilitate work at the main steam receiver mounted at the top of the stand. The floor was made of boards and allowed free access to all points within the cab. The recess intended for coal handling was secured with a canvas apron. It limited air turbulence within the cab, and thereby dust, thus improving working conditions in difficult weather conditions.

There were three doors to the cab. Two side doors allowed direct access from ground level, and one on the fireman's side provided access to the boiler inspection platform. On the driver's side, there was no door, only a hinged window. On both sides of the cab, there were also fixed front windows and sliding rear windows. Factory-made Pt47 locomotives had seats more commonly found in tank locomotives, like the TKt48. The round seat, pivotally attached to a bracket on the cab wall, had a built-in spring to absorb shocks during travel. Practically all tenderless steam locomotives of PKP have wooden seats with backrests.

==== Locomotive lightning ====
The electric lighting was used, the energy source of which came directly from a turbo generator powered by steam at 5 to 16 atm, with the exhaust steam having a maximum pressure of 1.5 atm. This allowed for a voltage of 25 volts and a power of 0.5 kW. The turbine, mounted on the right side of the boiler on the footplate directly in front of the locomotive cab, was operated by a steam valve from the driver's cab. The lighting was controlled from a distribution panel installed on the ceiling directly above the locomotive driver. Due to varying steam pressure and power demand, the steam pressure coming from the boiler was regulated using a slide valve. The installation, distributed throughout the locomotive via pipes and junction boxes labeled "Światło" on the cover, supplied power to the ceiling lamps of the locomotive and tender cab, the water gauge and speedometer, the connecting rods, the distributor, and the headlights.

==== Heating ====
The train's heating was provided by a switch valve in the driver's cab on the left side of the boiler. The assistant opened the valve and, using a manometer, monitored the steam pressure in the heating system, which reached up to 4 atm. Throughout the entire train, all valves on the buffer beams connecting the locomotive and subsequent cars were open and connected via the heating coupling. On the last car, the valve was set to a half-open position, causing abundant steaming with an intensity dependent on the pressure indicated by the assistant. In low temperatures, when the drain valves of the couplings and cars also produced steam, the entire train could stand on the platforms enveloped in clouds of steam.

==== SHP system ====
With the development of railway technology, SHP devices also began to be installed on steam locomotives. Steam locomotives were equipped at a single point with an electromagnet, which was always located on the right side of the locomotive. The system, powered by a turbo generator, was not fully functional and did not resemble the systems known in today's locomotives. It included a vigilance device and a buzzer, which, in the event that the driver exceeded the required response time, would initiate braking. The solenoid valve released air from the pipe, triggering emergency braking, but did not cut off the steam supply to the steam engine. This function was never implemented on any PKP steam locomotives. It was known on Western steam locomotives of series such as the French 231, or the German 01, or the modernized version 012. Using a pneumatic actuator, in the event the vigilance device was not acknowledged, air was admitted to the actuator, causing the throttle lever to close.

=== Tenders used by the locomotive ===
The construction of steam locomotives in post-war Poland progressed relatively quickly. Already in 1948, 29 Pt47 locomotives were put into service by PKP. The new tender design of the Polish-built 33D48 series produced at Pafawag would still not meet the existing demand for a long time. The concept of reconstructing the 32D29 tender used in Pt31 locomotives with Diamond trucks was rejected, and to prevent new locomotives from being idle, a decision was made to adapt the tenders of the former German Pm2 and Ty4 locomotives awaiting repair or reconstruction. The former German tenders were mainly box-type 2'2'T34 constructions, which were designated 34D44 by PKP. However, the design adapted to coupling with locomotives with an open cab required modification, and as a result, the 34D48 tenders were created, which were quite commonly used with Pt47 locomotives. The tenders were obtained from among the Pm2 and Ty4 locomotives that were awaiting repairs. Among them were also locomotives equipped with an older type of tender, namely 2'2'T32, which was an older riveted construction with sliding bearings. These tenders were designated as series 32D2 on the PKP; however, after their adaptation for operation with the Pt47 equipped with a closed cab, they also received the designation 34D48. This led to some confusion and a lack of distinction between tenders through series designation. One of these locomotives is Pt47-38, featured in the cult film "Człowiek na torze" (Man on the Track), which has a 2'2'T32 type tender, but after reconstruction, it was designated as 34D48 with the number 91.

This action was intended to be temporary and required the implementation of a final solution to the problems of turbulence related to the lack of tenders. Therefore, work was simultaneously carried out to adapt the design of the 32D47 series barrel tender for Pt47 locomotives. Operation revealed a number of irregularities, such as unstable running at low water levels, or air turbulence at high speeds caused by the design. The concept was eventually abandoned, and in later years the Pt47 barrel tenders were transferred to other locomotive series.

Over time, the lack of tenders and the scale of the problem increased. Steam locomotive production outpaced tender deliveries, causing locomotives allocated to their depots to wait in reserve for their tenders. For example, the Pt47-87 and Pt47-88 locomotives, delivered to MD Iława in January 1950, had to wait for their allocations. The first Polish-designed tender, built in November 1949 by Pafawag Wrocław for the Pt47, was the 33D48 series tender. Engine drivers called the tenders coffins and disliked them due to the tenders having bogies with sliding bearings. The introduced design tended to overheat, which occasionally caused the bearings to melt at high speeds.

As a result of equipping steam locomotives with mechanical coal feeders, the so-called stoker, whose steam engine was built into the tender, there was a change in the capacity of the water tank and a change in the designations. German-era tenders 34D48, due to modernization, were designated as series 27D48. The only preserved locomotive with such a tender on its original bogies is Pt47-1 in Łódź, which stands with tender 27D48-1. Unfortunately, Polish tenders 33D48, as a result of being equipped with a mechanical coal feeder, were also designated as series 27D48. This created another confusion with the designation of two different tenders under the same series.

Since 1974, in ZNTK Bydgoszcz, Polish and ex-German tenders have undergone modernization. Polish tenders 33D48 and 27D48, from 1974 to 1976, due to design defects in the bogies and frequent wearing of axle bearings, underwent modernization involving the replacement of the bogies. The new design featured rolling bearings with simultaneous changes in the suspension system. The production of bogies, also carried out by ZNTK Bydgoszcz, proceeded systematically; however, despite modernization, the tenders did not receive a change in designation.

At the same time, the ex-German tenders also underwent modernization. The water tanks, filler openings, coal box, and the tenders themselves received new-type bogies. As a result, in order to distinguish the modernized tenders, their designation was changed from 34D48 to 34D74, tenders without a mechanical coal feeder and from 27D48, which was an ex-German tender with a stoker, to 27D74.

As a result of various situations and upheavals, strange occurrences happened. For example, for a certain period, the 27D48 tenders were labeled with the 26D48 series. This resulted from rounding up the water tank capacity to a full value in meters. Another tender, 26D48-14, was also equipped with a stoker but produced by Pafawag, with the Pt47-25 steam locomotive.

Due to a shortage of tenders, pairing Pt47 locomotives with tenders from other series also occurred, which was already rare. For example, two Pt47 locomotives operated with 26D5 tenders originating from Ty5 series locomotives. In the 21st century, Pt47-65 and Pt47-112 locomotives coupled with a 25D49 series tender originating from an Ol49 locomotive. Pt47 locomotives could not be turned on the turntable at the Wolsztyn engine shed. This procedure enabled it, as well as winter housing in the shed where it served as a heater. The difference in height between the tender and locomotive couplings caused improper cooperation between the two rolling stock and their damage. The extent of subsequent repairs increased, and as a result, the Pt47-65 locomotive rebuilt by the Chabówka museum required greater effort, and after the repair, it received the correct 34D74-42 tender.

Tender summary
Tender series	34D48	27D48	34D74	27D74	33D48	27D48
Manufacturer	DR	DR	ZNTK Bydgoszcz	ZNTK Bydgoszcz	Pafawag	Pafawag
Water capacity	34m3	27m3	34m3	27m3	33m3	27m3
Coal capacity	10 t	10 t	10 t	10 t	17 t	17 t
Empty mass	29.9 t				27.9 t	
Loaded mass	74.2 t				79.2 t	
Tender length along with the locomotive	23 835 mm	23 835 mm	23 835 mm	23 835 mm	24 255 mm	24 255 mm
Tender length	8 645 mm	8 645 mm	8 645 mm	8 645 mm	9 130 mm	9 130 mm
Stoker	no	yes	no	yes	no	yes

== Service ==
The first, brand new locomotives of the Pt47 class were allocated to locomotive depots handling the most responsible tasks in passenger traffic. The first 11 produced in Chrzanów were assigned to the Łódź Directorate, Łódź Kaliska Locomotive Depot, while the next ones went to MD Poznań Osobowa (Pt27-12 to 20), Wrocław Główny (Pt47-21 to 28), and MD Piotrków (Pt47-29 to 32), also within the Łódź DOKP. The first locomotives produced by Cegielski were also delivered to these same units – Pt47-101 to 113 were sent to Poznań, and Pt47-114 to 118 to Wrocław.

The largest number of locomotives of the class (53) was received by the Łódź Directorate, placing them – besides Łódź and Piotrków – also in Ostrów Wlelkopolski, Częstochowa, and Kutno. 36 Pt47 locomotives were assigned directly from the factories to the DOKP Poznań, and 26 went to the DOKP Wrocław. The remaining directorates, fulfilling (except for DOKP Gdańsk) a less significant role in servicing long-distance passenger traffic, had to make do with a smaller number of locomotives: DOKP Warsaw 19, DOKP Szczecin 11, DOKP Olsztyn (MD Białystok) 9, DOKP Katowice 8, DOKP Kraków 7, and MD Skarżysko-Kamienna in the Lublin directorate – 3 locomotives. The missing 8 locomotives in the list were formally assigned to DOKP Gdańsk, leaving them stored awaiting for the delivery of tenders. Upon their receipt, the locomotives were gradually distributed among other districts in 1951.

In the beginning of the 1950s, in depots possessing a small number of Pt47s, service was provided by other class of steam locomotives: in the Lublin and Krakow district, Pt31, in the Gdansk district, Pt1, Pm2, and Pm3.

Significant changes in the deployment of the Pt47 class primarily resulted from the aim to improve traction service through the use of relatively new locomotives, whose value was enhanced by the gradual installation of mechanical coal feeders. In the mid-1950s, the number of locomotives was progressively increased in Katowice, and subsequently in Skarżysko-Kamienna. Alongside the progress of railway electrification, certain locations for passenger steam locomotives were phased out. This initially concerned the Piotrków locomotive depot in the Łódź directorate, as well as the Kraków and Katowice depots. From then on, subsequent changes in deployment and service sections were increasingly driven by the development of modern traction, including diesel traction, following the introduction of the first express trains operated by SN61 motor cars and the introduction of Romanian ST43 locomotives to serve seasonal express trains.

In 1959, a group of over 20 Pt47 locomotives was assigned to the Gdańsk Regional Directorate of Railways (DOKP Gdańsk), in exchange for steam locomotives of other series transferred to the Olsztyn (Pm3) and Kraków (Pt31) Regional Directorates. The Katowice locomotive depot, along with the withdrawal of the Pt47 series, was assigned a couple of Pt31 locomotives, primarily for operating a short section to Zebrzydowice. While the Kraków directorate definitively ended the operation of the Pt47 series in 1959, it still appeared in the Katowice district in later periods (between 1967 and 1970 in the Tarnowskie Góry Locomotive Depot and from 1972 in the Częstochowa, and later Racibórz, Locomotive Depot). A similar situation also occurred in the Lublin Regional Directorate, which had a substantial group of Pt47 locomotives maintained in Skarżysko, which had to be surrendered to electrification of the Strzemieszyce – Dęblin line at the turn of the 1960s and 1970s. The Pt47 series returned to this district already in 1973, replacing worn-out Pt31 locomotives on long-distance trains.

The intensive period of operation of Pt47 steam locomotives in the first two decades was reflected in the distances they covered. In mid-1951, Wrocław’s Pt47-73 and Pt47-79, employed in ring services on the Wrocław – Łódź – Kraków – Wrocław route, achieved a daily run of 824 km, with Pt47-79 reaching a monthly distance of 21,289 km in July of that year. Achieving such results came at the cost of extraordinary effort by the locomotive crews, and due to difficulties in rationally organizing work schedules, it could not be sustained for a long period. However, in the 1950s, at least ten locomotives of the class achieved monthly distances exceeding 20,000 km. The unquestionable record holder remained Pt47-17 from Poznań, which covered such distances every month from January to September 1950. Its total mileage over 9 months amounted to 189,606 km, and for the entire year 209,584 km – it was the highest documented annual mileage of a PKP steam locomotive in history. Although these were record results, high monthly mileages exceeding 12,000 km were achieved by most locomotives in some depots (Poznań, Bydgoszcz Gówna, Słupsk, as well as Warsaw Odolany and Iława) over a longer period of time. However, it was primarily depended on the proper scheduling of work plans, as the number of most favorable express trains available was too small to ensure optimal use of all locomotives.

Despite having practically identical traction characteristics, the Pt31 and Pt47 locomotives, as a rule, did not perform the same tasks and had separate work schedules arranged for them. It was clearly evidenced by the assignments of both classes to individual DOKP directorates, and within those directorates where both temporarily operated, by the inventory allocations to different locomotive depots. An analysis of the work performed by individual units also generally shows more intensive use of the Pt47 class. Setting aside the peak results achieved during the era of work competition, in which, for natural reasons, mainly crews of brand new locomotives participated, it was also considered the impact of greater wear on Pt31 locomotives, which had been in service for over a decade, as well as the employment of the latter in work schedules with lower daily mileage.

The number of Pt47 locomotives was already reduced in 1965, with the withdrawal of the Pt47-151 locomotive from the MD Bydgoszcz Główna roster, and further retirements occurred systematically already in the first half of the 1970s, mainly concerning locomotives belonging to the Szczecin division. Decisions to withdraw successive locomotives were made despite the fact that PKP still had a shortage of traction rolling stock for long-distance trains. The reason for the situation was the accelerated wear of the locomotives to a degree, which practically made repairs impossible, especially the occurrence of complex frame cracks, mostly near the first journal openings. Neither the ZNTK in Bydgoszcz, burdened with ongoing tasks (they were still conducting periodic repairs of older Pt31 and Pm2 classes), nor PKP were interested in repairs of such a large scale, as there was no justification for investing funds in costly repairs given the anticipated phasing out of steam traction in the coming years. However, only a few Pt47 locomotives were designated for removal from the inventory as a result of damages sustained in railway accidents.

In the second half of the 1970s, during a period of particularly intensive electrification of the railway lines with a high share of passenger traffic and the largest deliveries of new diesel locomotives in the history of PKP, the role of the Pt47 locomotives began to decline sharply. Only during holiday transport periods were the reserve rolling stock still used; at other times, locomotives of the class were placed for storage, and at best assigned to more subordinate duties – servicing local trains, and even freight or work trains.

Apart from the Southern DOKP, where express locomotives were completely withdrawn with the electrification of the mainline, until 1977 Pt47 locomotives were regularly used in passenger traffic in all other directorate districts. Even before the end of the decade, their role was marginalized in the Northern district and they were completely withdrawn from the Silesian DOKP. From the Racibórz locomotive depot, which at that time was responsible for servicing the intensive local traffic on the Katowice – Rybnik – Racibórz section, most Pt47s were transferred to Rozwadów, where, also in servicing local traffic, they were to replace the last examples of the Pt31 class. The Silesian DOKP, thanks to investments made in electrification, was the only district in which, at that time, the Pt47 class was not only completely withdrawn from service, but steam traction in passenger traffic was also consistently eliminated.

In the second half of the 1970s, the delivery of new diesel rolling stock for passenger service was completely halted; in the first quarter of 1975, the last SN61 motor cars arrived from Hungary, and at the end of 1977, Cegielski stopped supplying SU46 locomotives, while a year later, Fablok also ended production of the SP42 class. As there were increasing difficulties in performing periodic maintenance on diesel locomotives, and the pace of electrification had slowed, between the 1970s and 1980s, there was a temporary rise in the demand for steam locomotives, particularly when it was necessary to provide heating for passenger cars.

The problems with maintaining the operability of diesel stock were greatest, the employment of Pt47 locomotives was reinstated, and in some locomotive depots they appeared again in work schedules. For example, in the Northern Directorate, they were once again assigned to the Toruń and Olsztyn Depots, and in Skarżysko-Kamienna they returned to servicing express trains. After the electrification of the Warsaw – Terespol railway was completed, some of the Siedlce locomotives were sent back to Białystok. Individual units were operated, among others, in the Wrocław Gądów and Iłowo locomotive depots.

Despite the increased demand from PKP for steam locomotives in passenger traffic operations, the possibilities for performing periodic overhauls of the Pt47 locomotives were significantly limited. ZNTK Bydgoszcz, which were the sole contractor for their major and medium repairs, radically reduced the execution of the former from 1982, and in mid-1985 accepted the last steam locomotives for periodic repairs, shifting their activity profile to the repair of heavy diesel locomotives. The lack of another contractor capable of performing major repairs, which ZNTK in Oleśnica and Piła could not undertake at the time, determined the further fate of the entire Pt47 class, it was approximately 95 machines that remained "in steam" in the years 1985/1986. Despite the ongoing demand, over the next three years all locomotives had to be withdrawn from service. Individual units, which underwent major repairs in 1984, despite relatively distant internal inspection dates, also did not last until the end of the decade due to detected damage to boilers or chassis. Their tasks, if it was not possible to allocate diesel locomotives for the purpose, still had to be taken over, even in express service, by Ty2 and Ty42 steam locomotives.

In the beginning of 1988, only five locomotives remained in active service. The Poznań Pt47-65 was decommissioned in January upon the expiration of its boiler inspection period. The Skarżysko Pt47-138 on April 27 operated the special train “Karpaty” on the Sandomierz – Skarżysko-Kamienna section and was decommissioned before the end of the month. This locomotive soon went to Austria, where it was put back into service, with considerable effort made to partially resemble Pt31. In the Szczecin Directorate, the lone Pt47-106 stationed in Kostrzyn was decommissioned on the first day of April, not surviving until the date of its next boiler inspection, scheduled for February 1989.

In January 1988, the final reassignment of stationing took place, transferring two Pt47 locomotives, Pt47-13 and Pt47-104, from Skarżysko-Kamienna to Rozwadów, which thus became the last refuge for the Pt47 class. For several winter months, their primary role was servicing the "Karpaty" on the Przeworsk – Sandomierz section, and later also local passenger trains to Dębica and Rzeszów. With the decommissioning of "104" in early May, the lone Pt47-13 diligently served until its final day, set by the internal boiler inspection deadline on 30 October 1988. The fortunate "thirteen" not only outlived all other units in service, but after years of wandering, gained a special place of exhibition near the Skarżysko-Kamienna station, close to the locomotive shed, which had been one of the key service locations for Pt31 locomotives since the mid-1930s and for Pt47 locomotives for nearly their entire period of operation.

The program developed by the General Directorate of PKP for the creation of steam traction open-air museums was made possible, however, for several Pt47 class locomotives to return to service. In the autumn of 1988, arrangements were made with ZNTK Piła regarding the conditions for performing major repairs on two units, selecting them from the roster of the Kłodzko locomotive depot, to which they were to be sent after repair. In July 1989, Pt47-112 was delivered after repair, and in March 1990, Pt47-28. Apart from the program, the Pt47-65 locomotive was sent for repair. This was an initiative of the Western DOKP in Poznań, related to the development of the open-air museum in Wolsztyn. The repair of the locomotive was also carried out by ZNTK in Piła, from 17 November 1989 to 31 August 1990, as a major repair of category G-4, combined with the installation of a new firebox and the replacement of the smoke box bell. Pt47-65 was sent for a repair despite being formally removed from the locomotive register in August 1988. After the repairs, it was re-entered in the PKP inventory on 6 September 1990.

=== Distribution of locomotives ===
1 January 1959
PKP class Pt47 (Poland)
Name	Fleet numbers	Quantity	
DOKP Warsaw
Warszawa Odolany	4, 35, 36, 46, 47, 48, 49, 50, 56, 57, 90, 92, 136, 147, 149, 150, 153, 156, 165, 166, 171	21	47
Łódź Kaliska	2, 3, 5, 6, 7, 10, 16, 69, 71, 77, 122, 123, 124, 129, 130, 131, 135, 141	18	47
Iłowo	32, 38, 100, 125, 133, 148, 162, 164	8	47
DOKP Lublin
Skarżysko-Kamienna	8, 27, 33, 40, 44, 79, 80, 96, 119, 144, 152, 154, 158, 159, 160, 174	16	
DOKP Kraków
Kraków	14, 26, 86, 151, 161, 168, 175, 176 ,177 ,178	10	
DOKP Katowice
Katowice	18, 60, 88, 169	4	
DOKP Wrocław
Wrocław Główny	11, 12, 21, 22, 23, 24, 25, 28, 30, 34, 52, 58, 73, 74, 75, 78, 82, 111, 114, 115, 116, 117, 118, 126, 140, 155	27	
DOKP Poznań
Poznań Osobowa	1, 13, 15, 17, 19, 20, 29, 37, 39, 42, 43, 72, 87, 101, 102, 103, 104, 105, 107, 107, 108, 109, 110, 112, 121, 132, 167, 170, 172	29	56
Otsrów Wielkopolski	9, 51, 53, 54, 55, 61, 63, 64, 65, 66, 67, 68, 70, 76, 81, 120, 127, 128, 134	19	56
Zielona Góra	62, 91, 94, 97, 138, 157, 163, 179	8	56
DOKP Szczecin
Szczecin Główny	31, 142	2	13
Słupsk	41, 83, 84, 85, 137, 139, 143, 145, 146, 173, 180	11	13
DOKP Olstyn
Olsztyn	45, 59, 89, 93, 95, 98, 99	7	
Total		180	

1 January 1982
PKP class Pt47 (Poland)
Name	Fleet numbers	Quantity	
Central DOKP
Białystok	32, 38, 46, 47, 49, 50, 57, 57, 125, 150, 156	11	
Eastern DOKP
Lublin	11, 13, 45, 48, 55, 60, 63, 88, 93, 97, 102, 103, 104, 110, 111, 126, 130, 148, 152, 157	20	44
Skarżysko-Kamienna	35, 56, 68, 73, 82, 89, 90, 136, 141, 146, 149, 162, 166, 176	14	44
Rozwadów	40, 59, 83, 128, 131, 138, 142, 161, 167, 172	10	44
Northern DOKP
Toruń	26, 77, 99, 100, 129, 135, 163	7	14
Olsztyn	70, 71, 79, 84, 133, 143, 171	7	14
Lower Silesian DOKP
Wrocław Gądów	10, 18, 28, 112	4	21
Kłodzko	17, 20, 22, 24, 30, 44, 52, 74, 78, 86, 113, 116, 117, 118, 155, 165, 168	17	21
Western DOKP
Poznań Główny	1, 6, 51, 65, 72, 81, 87, 169	8	29
Kostrzyn	19, 23, 29, 37, 43, 64, 101, 108, 120, 121, 170, 180	12	29
Żagań	2, 9, 21, 98, 195, 115, 122, 134, 177	9	29
Pomeranian DOKP
Słupsk	25, 94, 173	3	36
Szczecinek	14, 27, 33, 34, 36, 39, 76, 106, 107, 123, 140, 144, 147, 153, 154, 160	16	36
Białograd	31, 58, 66, 69, 80, 109, 114, 119, 124, 139, 179	12	36
Stargard Szczeciński	8, 16, 91, 132, 159	5	36
Total	Withdrawn	25	180
Total	Active	155	180

== Withdrawal and scrapping ==
The first steam locomotive of the class to be withdrawn was Pt47-151, which happened to be withdrawn in 1965. The second was Pt47-178, withdrawn in 1972. The withdrawal of Pt47 locomotives started in 1973, when the modern traction was steadily increasing. However, most of the locomotives remained in service for most of its time, as only a few locomotives were withdrawn. Since the mid-1980s, the most number of locomotives began to phase out, mainly from dieselisation and electrification, the last locomotives were withdrawn in 1988 and 1989. One of Pt47's diesel successors were likely SP45, SU46, ST43 and ST44.

After the withdrawal, Pt47 locomotives were scrapped immediately, while some were left abandoned. Most locomotives were scrapped in the 1980s and 1990s, while the last being scrapped in the 2000s, the last Pt47 locomotive to be scrapped was Pt47-17, which was scrapped in 2008 in Ścinawka Średnia. 36 were confirmed to be scrapped in Chrościna, 48 at locomotive depots and 79 unknown.

Withdrawals
Year	Number withdrawn	Fleet numbers	Notes
1965	1	151	
1972	1	178	
1973	3	7, 62, 127	
1974	3	92, 96, 145	
1975	5	54, 75, 85, 158, 175	
1976	2	53, 61	
1977	2	41, 95	
1978	5	3, 12, 42, 164, 174	
1979	2	5, 15	
1981	1	137	
1982	1	153	
1983	10	8, 86, 107, 122, 123, 128, 139, 147, 177, 179	
1984	10	23, 70, 79, 84, 91, 143, 146, 154, 161, 176	
1985	23	24, 29, 31, 35, 56, 59, 64, 68, 73, 81, 89, 90, 93, 114, 116, 124, 131, 134, 136, 142, 163, 167, 173	Pt47-93 preserved
1986	30	10, 11, 16, 19, 33, 36, 37, 39, 40, 45, 46, 55, 58, 66, 67, 71, 76, 88, 111, 117, 118, 119, 132, 140, 141, 144, 159, 160, 162, 172	
1987	58	1, 4, 9, 14, 17, 18, 21, 22, 25, 26, 27, 30, 32, 34, 43, 48, 49, 50, 51, 52, 57, 60, 63, 69, 72, 74, 77, 80, 82, 83, 87, 94, 97, 98, 101, 102, 103, 108, 109, 110, 115, 120, 121, 125, 126, 130, 133, 148, 149, 150, 152, 156, 157, 165, 166, 168, 170, 180	Pt47-1, 14, 50, 101, 121, 152 and 157 preserved
1988	18	2, 6, 20, 38, 44, 47, 65, 78, 99, 100, 105, 106, 129, 135, 138, 155, 169, 171	Pt47-20, 65, 106, 138, 155 and 171 preserved
1989	2	13, 104	All preserved

== Preservation ==
A total of 17 locomotives have been preserved, which include eight for static display, six plinthed as monuments, two out of order and one operational

Fleet number		Image	Builder	Owner	Location	Condition
Poland	Austria	Image	Builder	Owner	Location	Condition
Pt47-1			Fablok		Łódź Olechów locomotive depot, Łódź	Monument
Pt47-13			Fablok		Skarżysko-Kamienna railway station, Skarżysko-Kamienna	Monument
Pt47-14			Fablok		Pesta company area, Stargard Szczeciński	Monument
Pt47-20			Fablok		Wrocław Główny locomotive depot, Wrocław	Monument
Pt47-28			Fablok	Silesian Railway museum	Jaworzyna Śląska	Static display
Pt47-50			Fablok	Protection of Railway Monuments and the Organization of Open-Air Museums society in Pyskowice	Pyskowice	Static display
Pt47-65			Fablok	Wolsztyn locomotive roundhouse	Wolsztyn	Operational
Pt47-93			Fablok	Zduńska Wola Karsznice Open-Air Museum	Zduńska Wola	Static display
Pt47-101			Cegielski	Jarocin Open-Air Museum	Jarocin	Static display
Pt47-104			Cegielski	Warsaw Railway Museum	Warsaw	Static display
Pt47-106			Cegielski	Wolsztyn locomotive roundhouse	Wolsztyn	Static display
Pt47-112			Cegielski	Wolsztyn locomotive roundhouse	Wolsztyn	Out of order
Pt47-121			Cegielski		Kostrzyn nad Odrą locomotive depot, Kostrzyn nad Odrą	Monument
Pt47-138	ÖBB 919 138		Cegielski	Brenner & Brenner	Austria	Out of order
Pt47-152			Cegielski	Chabówka Railway Museum	Chabówka	Static display
Pt47-155			Cegielski	Silesian Railway museum	Jaworzyna Śląska	Static display
Pt47-157			Cegielski		Lublin locomotive depot, Lublin	Monument
Pt47-171			Fablok	Kościerzyna Railway Museum	Kościerzyna	Static display

=== Locomotive details ===
- Pt47-1 is the first built and the oldest preserved steam locomotive of the class, it is also the last steam locomotive of the class ever repaired. The locomotive was built by Fablok in 1948, where it was first assigned to the Łódź directorate at the Łódź Kaliska depot, and last reassigned to the Western directorate at the Kostrzyn Depot on 3 February 1983. The locomotive retired on 27 May 1987 and was withdrawn on 8 September of the same year. On the initiative of Tomasz Roszak, the locomotive had its overhaul at the Skarżysko-Kamienna depot, where on 12 April 1989, it returned to steam, restoring its appearance from the first period of operation. The locomotive was later retired on 31 July 1989, and was transported to Łódź Olechów depot in 1998, where it was plinthed as a monument.
- Pt47-13 was built by Fablok in 1948, it was first assigned to Poznań directorate at the Poznań Osobowa depot, and was last reassigned at Rozwadów depot in Stalowa Wola on 7 January 1988, the locomotive was delegated at the Lublin depot on 21 June of the same year, and returned to Rozwadów on 1 July. On 10 September 1988, the locomotive along with Ty51-208 hauled the Orient Express train from Paris to Hong Kong on the Siedlce – Terespol section. The locomotive was withdrawn on 4 May 1989, and was displaced at Zarzeka railway station, in 1993, it was transported to Szczakowa, where it was restored along with Ty51-9 before being exhibited in the mini open-air museum at Bielsko-Biała Główna railway station. On 8 July 2011, the locomotive was transported to Skarżysko-Kamienna depot for an overhaul by an Axel-Rail company, and was plinthed as a monument next to the station building at the Skarżysko-Kamienna railway station on 13 April 2012.
- Pt47-14 was built by Fablok in 1949, it was first assigned to Poznań directorate at the Poznań Osobowa depot, and was last reassigned to the Pomeranian directorate at the Białogard locomotive depot on 8 January 1987. The locomotive retired on 21 May 1987 and was withdrawn on 22 July of the same year, it was transported to Stargard Szceciński where was plinthed as a monument at the railway technical school in 2000, and was later transported to the railway station in 2004. In October 2015, the locomotive was relocated to the premises of Pesta 2 Mirosław Rybowski.
- Pt47-20 was built by Fablok in 1949, it was first assigned to Poznań directorate at the Poznań Osobowa depot, and was last reassigned to the Lower Silesian directorate at the Kłodzko depot on 5 February 1975. The locomotive was withdrawn on 25 August 1988 and was plinthed as a monument on the Wrocław Główny locomotive depot area in Wrocław in January 1993. The locomotive is falsely designated as Pt47-94.
- Pt47-28 was built by Fablok in 1949, it was first assigned to Wrocław directorate at the Wrocław Główna depot, and was last reassigned to the Lower Silesian directorate at the Wałbrzych depot on 30 December 1982. The locomotive was withdrawn and transported to the scrapyard in Chrościna Nyska. On 14 August 1987, PKP made a decision to retain the steam locomotive as an operational vehicle in the planned museum within the former Kłodzko depot. In connection with the already completed transfer of the locomotive to Chróścina Nyska, a decision was made to swap the designation Pt47-28 with Pt47-113, which, in operational condition and with a valid boiler inspection, remained at Kłodzko depot. In April 1990, the locomotive had its overhaul at ZNTK Piła where it returned to steam, and on 22 May 1992, it took part in the rolling stock parade on the occasion of the 150th anniversary of the railway in the Polish territories at Wrocław Świebodzki railway station. On 3 September 2005, the locomotive was transported to the Silesian Railway Museum in Jaworzyna Śląska, where it was preserved for static display.
- Pt47-50 was built by Fablok in 1949, it was first assigned to Warsaw directorate at the Warszawa Zachodnia depot, and was last reassigned to the Central directorate at the Tomaszów Mazowiecki depot on 10 October 1985. The locomotive was withdrawn on 18 March 1987, where it was plinthed as a monument at the Siedlce locomotive depot in May 1989. On 29 October 2005, due to the dismantled section of the track where the locomotive was positioned, it was moved using the hydraulic equipment of the PLK rescue train onto the track, which on 2 November the same year, SM48-030 locomotive shifted the steam locomotive to the former locomotive shed, where it was prepared for transport. On 7 October 2006, the locomotive was transported to Pyskowice via the 3E-001 electric locomotive owned by PTKiGK Zabrze, where upon arrival, it was preserved by the Protection of Railway Monuments and the Organization of Open-Air Museums society in Pyskowice as a static display.
- Pt47-93 was built by Fablok in 1950, it was first assigned to Białystok directorate at the Białystok locomotive depot, and was last reassigned to the Eastern directorate at the Lublin depot on 22 December 1976. The locomotive was withdrawn on 26 March 1985, and was plinthed as a monument to technology at ZNTK Bydgoszcz after the repair. In 2001, it was transported to Zduńska Wola Karsznice Open-Air Museum in Zduńska Wola, where it was preserved as a static display.
- Pt47-101 was built by Cegielski, it was originally scheduled to be completed in mid-January 1949, instead it was built in 1948, its completion was expedited for propaganda purposes. The locomotive was first assigned to Poznań directorate at the Poznań Osobowa depot, and was last reassigned to the Eastern directorate at the Kostrzyn depot on 21 February 1975. The locomotive was withdrawn on 12 May 1987 an was displaced at H. Cegielski manufacturing plant in Poznań in 1988. On 6 November 1997, it was transported to Open-Air museum in Krzeszowice where it was preserved as a static display. On 12 November 2007, it was relocated to Kraków Płaszów depot in Kraków, and was transported to Jarocin on 21 June 2015 where it was preserved again.
- Pt47-104 was built by Cegielski in 1949, it was first assigned to Poznań directorate at the Poznań Osobowa depot, and was last reassigned to the Rozwadów depot in Stalowa Wola on 10 January 1988. The locomotive was withdrawn on 4 May 1989, it was displaced in Dęblin, before being transported to Warsaw Railway Museum in Warsaw in the 1990s, where it was preserved as a static display.
- Pt47-106 was built by Cegielski in 1949, it was first assigned to Poznań directorate at the Poznań Osobowa depot, and last reassigned to Western directorate at the Kostrzyn Depot on 3 March 1987. The locomotive was withdrawn on 26 July 1987 and was transported to Słupsk, it was later transported to Choszczno in 1994 where it was preserved as a static display. On 30 July 2001, after the closure of the facility in Choszczno, the locomotive was transported to Wolsztyn, in March 2008, on the premises of MD Wolsztyn it was restored through the efforts of the Era of Steam Locomotives Foundation thanks to funds raised during the Steam Locomotives Parade in 2007. After the renovation of the locomotive, completed in April 2008, it was placed on the idle tracks near the WL signal box in Wolsztyn.
- Pt47-121 was built by Cegielski in 1949, it was first assigned at Piotrków Trybunalski depot, and last reassigned to Western directorate at the Kostrzyn Depot on 19 October 1993. The locomotive was withdrawn on 8 September 1987, after it was withdrawn, the locomotive was plinthed as a monument at the former locomotive depot in Kostrzyn.
- Pt47-138 was built by Cegielski in 1949, it was first assigned to Szczecin Directorate at Słupsk locomotive depot, and last reassigned to Eastern directorate at the Skarzysko-Kamienna Depot on 18 November 1983. On 27 April 1988, the locomotive hauled the last steam-hauled express train in Europe, named "Karpaty" on the Bucharest / Sofia - Warsaw route, three days later it was withdrawn from service. The locomotive was sold to Brenner & Brenner in Austria in 1990, where was sent for a major overhaul to resemble PKP class Pt31 designated as 919.138, it returned to Austria from České Velenice in Czech Republic in 2000. Currently, the locomotive is out of order.
- Pt47-152 was built by Cegielski in 1950, it was first assigned to Kraków Directorate at Kraków depot, and last reassigned to Eastern directorate at Lublin Depot on 7 December 1976. The locomotive was withdrawn from service on 16 July 1987, then was transferred to Skarżysko-Kamienna Depot, where it was repaired and received the 33D48 tender with original bogies, and was transferred to Trzebinia as a monument to technology. Not long after in 1992, the locomotive was transferred to Krakow Główny, and to Chabówka Railway Museum in Chabówka in 1993.
- Pt47-155 was built by Cegielski in 1950, it was first and last assigned at Kłodzko depot. The locomotive was withdrawn from service on 25 August 1988, then was transferred to Ścinawka Średnia in 1993, from where, after years of storage, it was taken to the Silesian Railway Museum in Jaworzyna Śląska, where it was preserved for static display. On 8 March 2021, As a result of a detailed photographic analysis, Tomisław Czarnecki determined that the locomotive Pt47-78, is actually Pt47-155, the real Pt47-78 was scrapped.
- Pt47-157 was built by Cegielski in 1950, it was first assigned to Szczecin Directorate at Szczecin depot, and last assigned to the Eastern Directorate at Lublin depot on 24 February 1976. The locomotive was withdrawn from service on 10 March 1987, after it was withdrawn, the locomotive was plinthed as a monument near the railway station in Lublin on 30 June 1988.
- Pt47-171 was built by Fablok in 1950, it was first assigned to Katowice Directorate at Katowice depot, and last assigned to the Northern Directorate at Olsztyn depot in November 1981. The locomotive was withdrawn on 24 August 1988, and was transferred to Kościerzyna Railway Museum in 1992, where it was preserved for static display.

==== Pt47-65 ====
Pt47-65 as the only operational steam locomotive of the class with an excursion train in Zbąszynek in 2017

Pt47-65 is the only operational steam locomotive of the class, it is assigned to pull special and heritage trains (including the Blues Express) and took part in various steam locomotive parades mostly in Wolsztyn. The locomotive was built in 1949 by Fablok, it was first assigned to the Poznań directorate at the Ostrów Wielkopolski depot, and was last reassigned to the same directorate at the Poznań Główna depot on 1 January 1971. On 24 August 1988, the locomotive was withdrawn from service. It underwent a major overhaul at ZNTK Piła and was designated for sale to Morocco in December 1989. However, the transaction never took place, and instead the locomotive was relocated to Wolsztyn on 6 September 1990, and was used to operate scheduled passenger trains.

Due to its length, the locomotive was too long for the turntable and sometimes ran with the tender leading. After the repairs in Gniezno, the locomotive returned to Wolsztyn with a shorter tender from the Ol49-59 locomotive, which allowed it to fit on the turntable. Currently, the locomotive operates with the tender 34D74-42, and its length prevents it from being turned on the Wolsztyn turntable. From December 2004 to September 2009, due to the poor technical condition of the bridge at a kilometer 109 on the Sulechów–Luboń line and the excessive axle load on a single meter of track, The locomotive could not travel to Poznań. After the bridge was replaced with a new bridge, the locomotive departed to Poznań after almost 5 years of displacement on 26 September 2009. The locomotive was operated by Stanisław Szczeciński and Marek Rybarczyk. The last journey before the overhaul of locomotive took place on 16 August 2025, to and from Poznań. On 11 December after 92 days of overhaul, the locomotive was fired up again. A day later, a test run took place, which revealed minor issues that nevertheless had to be resolved. The second test run took place on 19 December of the same year, with positive results. On 26 December, the locomotive traveled to Poznań for a reenactment of Ignacy Paderewski's arrival.

From 19 October 2001, after an already extended inspection period, the locomotive was in Gniezno until 15 July 2003, when it returned to Wolsztyn after a major overhaul. The next major overhaul was scheduled for 10 July 2009, which the deadline for the external inspection has been passed. This steam locomotive was first sent to Leszno, where it awaited repair in Gniezno; however, on 15 November it was brought back to Wolsztyn, as it had been removed from the repair list for 2006. Pt47-65 eventually went to Gniezno, where it underwent an external inspection. It returned to Wolsztyn on 30 April 2009. The next major overhaul was completed in April 2016. The steam locomotive returned to Wolsztyn on 29 April 2016. With a parade of steam locomotives in the new green-olive livery. On 3 October 2022, at noon, the locomotive set off the way to Kolín in the Czech Republic, hauled by the diesel locomotive ST44-1245. A boiler inspection was carried out in Kolín. Afterwards, the locomotive was sent to Leszno, and on 7 August 2023, it returned to Wolsztyn, hauled by the diesel locomotive SM42-1229.

==== Pt47-112 ====
Pt47-112 locomotive eventually out of service in Wolsztyn in 2017

Pt47-112 was built by Cegielski in 1949, it was first assigned to Poznań directorate at the Poznań Osobowa depot, and last reassigned to the Lower Silesian directorate at the Wałbrzych Depot on 19 October 1993. On 10 September 1988, the locomotive along with Ty51-92 hauled the Orient Express train from Paris to Hong Kong on the Kutno – Warsaw – Siedlce section. In 1995, it was styled as a French SNCF Class 141R locomotive for the film "Les Milles", of which the filming took place at the Ścinawka Średnia railway station. On 4 May 2002, the locomotive was relocated to Wolsztyn, where it was used for shunting duties and hauling freight trains. After the major overhaul carried out in Gniezno, it returned to Wolsztyn on 26 January 2005, with the tender from the Ol49-59 locomotive. As a result, the locomotive was shorter, could be turned on the turntable, and thus could enter the shed on longer tracks. After the last medium repair in 2007, the locomotive received a new tender, 27D48-57, with which Pt47-65 ran until July 2005. On 1 March 2009, the external revision date of the locomotive expired. Despite the internal revision being valid until 1 March 2011, it was taken out of the shed on 21 April 2009. The last service of the locomotive took place on 12 December 2008, operating the last scheduled train on the line to Leszno. The locomotive is currently out of order and remains as a decommissioned wreck.

== Accidents and incidents ==
- On 26 January 1954, Pt47-45 with an express train on the Białystok - Olsztyn - Gdynia route full of passengers, collided with a freight train hauled by the Ty23-154 steam locomotive at the Sątopy-Samulewo railway station, a disaster occurs involving the express train on the Białystok - Olsztyn - Gdynia route. The express train was composed of Fy (baggage) + Chxz + Bhuxzt + Bhuxzt + Chxz + Chxz + Sl (refrigerated car) + Gmx (mail car) wagons, which as a result of the accident, 18 people died, including the crew of the baggage car and the freight locomotive. The rescue operation is hindered by a snow-heavy winter and a low temperature of 30 degrees below zero.
- On 3 January 1963, Pt47-136 with a passenger train on the Kudowa Zdrój/Jelenia Góra - Warsaw route, derailed 8 carriages when approaching the additional main track at Kalisz station. The cause of the accident, which resulted in the death of the three-person locomotive crew, was excessive speed and ignoring the speed limit of 40 km/h (25 mph).
- In May 1963, Pt47-137 with an express train from Szczecin to Gdynia, collided with the back of a freight train hauled by Ty2 locomotive. The crew of the Ty2 locomotive passed a "stop" signal while observing a "proceed" semaphore, which applied to the track on which the train operated by the Pt47 locomotive was traveling. As a result of the incident, the crew sustained bruises but survived thanks to escaping onto the tender. The Pt47-137 locomotive suffered serious damage to the smokebox, blastpipe, cylinders, pistons, slide valves, connecting rods, rods, trusses, and braces, and was directed for emergency repair at ZNTK Bydgoszcz.
- On 15 October 1963, Pt47-123, with an express train from Łódź Kaliska to Szczecin, derailed with all axles along with a baggage car and two 2nd class Pullman cars due to a malfunctioning switch at Brużyca station. A railway worker present on the station platform died in the hospital.
- On 3 March 1965, Pt47-125 with an express train from Wrocław to Łódź, derailed with all axles at Sośnie Ostrowskie station. Along with the locomotive, a postal carriage and one bogie of a baggage car derailed from the tracks. The cause of the derailment was a turnout, ripped open by the Ty2-660 locomotive of the collective train, whose switch points did not engage with the stock rail.
- On 18 August 1965, Pt47-172 with a passenger train on the Wrocław - Kłodzko via Kobierzyce - Świdnica - Ząbkowice Śląskie - Kamieniec Ząbkowicki route, ran into a pile of stones placed by children in the village of Pustków Żurowski. As a result of the incident, the Pt47 overturned onto its side, and four subsequent cars were crushed, causing injuries to over 30 people, including 2 seriously injured.
- On 29 December 1966, Pt47-173 with a passenger train on the Szczecin - Wrocław route, derailed near the Drzeńsko signal box due to passing a turnout at a lateral speed of 70 km/h (43 mph), limited to 20 km/h (12 mph), of which the locomotive driver was unaware. As a result of the derailment from a high embankment, the locomotive and 6 of the train's 9 carriages fell. Six people died, including the assistant driver of locomotive Pt47-173.
- On 23 July 1974, Pt47-168 with a passenger train on the Jelenia Góra - Kraków route on the Marciszów - Mariszów Górny section, collided head-on with the locomotive Ty2-580 hauling a freight train. The accident occurred as a result of the freight train being directed onto the wrong track by the traffic controller. Consequently, 31 people were injured, including both locomotive crews. The Ty2 steam locomotive was scrapped due to frame distortion.
- On 3 February 1985, an unknown Pt47 locomotive between Dytmarów and Prudnik, collided with an RSP Jasiona tractor. Two people were killed on the spot, and one was seriously injured (the man fell into a coma and died several years later). The accident was caused by a crossing keeper's mistake near Dytmarów, who despite being aware of the approaching train, raised the barriers at the request of the tractor's passengers so they could pass. Due to the snowstorm, the engine driver did not see the tractor. The locomotive stopped in Prudnik, where blood and a bag of clothes, which had attached to the locomotive after the impact, were noticed on the front of the locomotive.
- On 30 August 2008, Pt47-112 with an excursion train "Wolsztyn Experience" to Wrocław, collided with a tractor pulling a tanker trailer on a railway crossing near Perkowo. The driver of the tractor was transported to the hospital.

== Nicknames ==
- Petucha - after the first two letters of the name
- Pyta

== See also ==
- PKP class Pm36 – Polish interwar express steam locomotive built in 1937, with one being streamlined
- PKP class TKt48 – Polish freight steam tank locomotive built between 1950 and 1957
- PKP class Ol49 – Polish passenger steam locomotive built between 1951 and 1954
- PKP class Ty2 – German freight steam locomotive widely used in Poland built between 1942 and c. 1950
