= PKP class Pu29 =

PKP Pu29
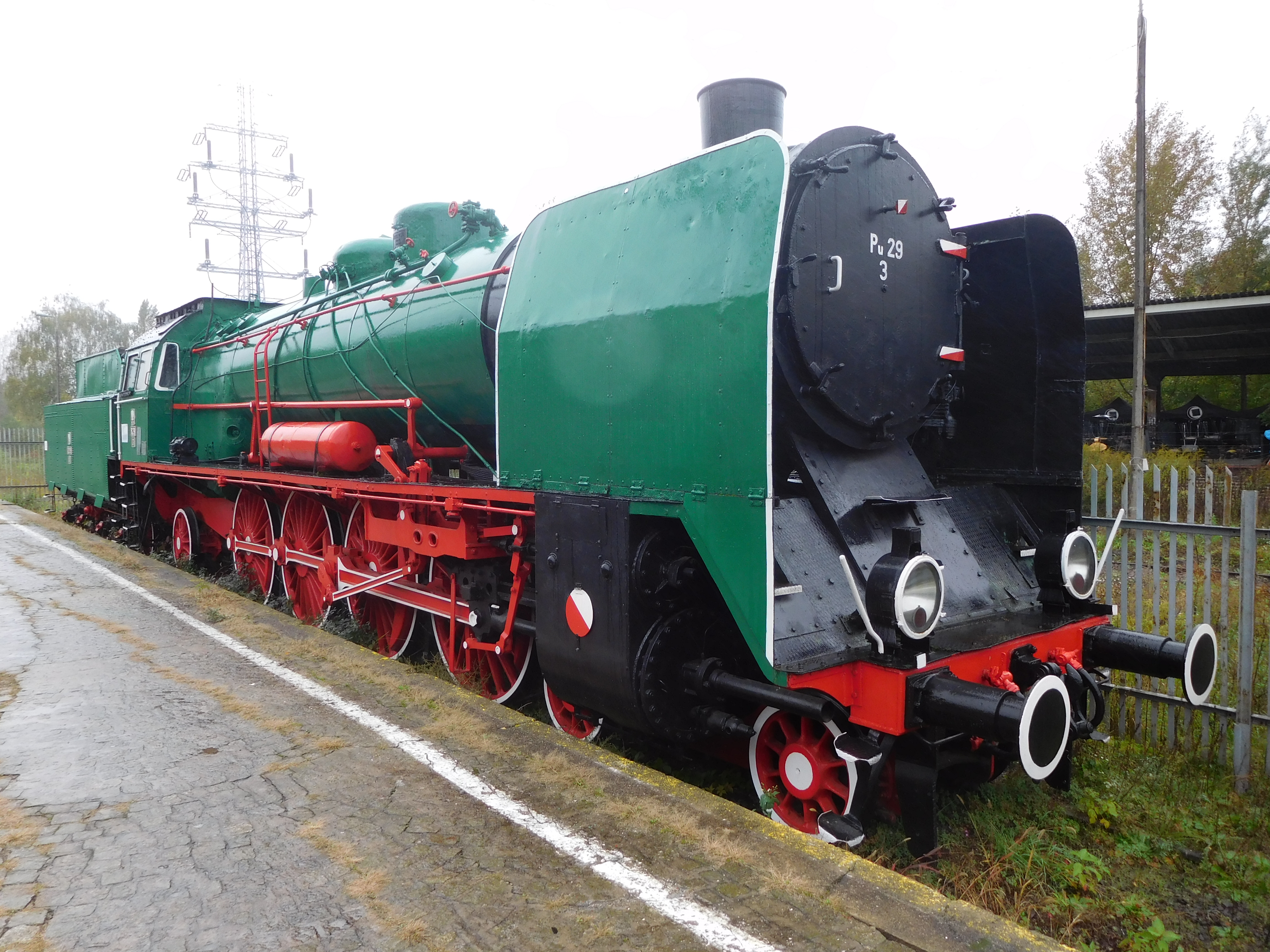
- Pt31 locomotive
Type and origin
- Power type: Steam
- Builder: H. Cegielski – Poznań
- Serial number: 198–200
- Build date: 1931
- Total produced: 3
Specifications
- Configuration
  - Whyte: 4-8-2
  - UIC: 2′D1′ h2
- Gauge: 1,435 mm (4 ft 8 1/2 in) standard gauge
- Leading dia.: 860 mm (33.86 in)
- Driver dia.: 1,850 mm (72.83 in)
- Trailing dia.: 1,200 mm (47.24 in)
- Tender wheels: 1,000 mm (39.37 in)
- Minimum curve: 150 m (492 ft 2 in)
- Wheelbase
  - Engine: 13.200 m (43 ft 4 in)
  - Drivers: 6.000 m (19 ft 8 in)
  - Tender: 5.600 m (18 ft 4 in)
- Length: 24.595 m (80 ft 8 in) (with tender)
- Height: 4.630 m (15 ft 2 in)
- Axle load: 18.5 tonnes
- Loco weight: 113.8 tonnes
- Tender weight: 68.5 tonnes
- Total weight: 182.3 tonnes
- Tender type: 32D29
- Water cap.: 32 m^{3} (1,100 cu ft)
- Tender cap.: 10.0 tonnes
- Firebox
  - Grate area: 4.95 m^{2} (53.3 sq ft)
- Boiler pressure: 15 kg/cm^{2} (1.47 MPa; 213 psi)
- Heating surface: 230.5 m^{2} (2,481 sq ft)
- Superheater
  - Heating area: 86.8 m^{2} (934 sq ft)
- Cylinders: Two, outside
- Cylinder size: 630 mm × 700 mm (24.80 in × 27.56 in)
- Valve gear: Heusinger
Performance figures
- Maximum speed: 110 km/h (68 mph)
- Power output: 1,820 hp (1,360 kW)
- Tractive effort: 13,500 kgf (29,760 lbf)
Career
- Operators: PKP
- Class: Pu29
- Numbers: Pu29-1 to Pu29-3
- Locale: Poland
- Delivered: 1931
- Retired: 1970
- Preserved: 1

PKP Class Pu29 is a Polish steam locomotive of Polskie Koleje Państwowe, designed for hauling heavy long-distance passenger trains, built in 1931. The designation stood for fast passenger (P) 4-8-2 (u) steam locomotive accepted in 1929.

The locomotive was designed and constructed by H. Cegielski in Poznań. In late 1920s Polish Ministry of Transport ordered two classes of fast passenger locomotives to haul heavy trains in Polish factories, to compare their merits. The design by H. Cegielski was accepted in 1929 as Pu29, and three prototypes were built in 1931 (factory numbers: 198-200). The design was successful, but lost in competition to more compact 2-8-2 Pt31 by Fablok, which better suited Polish turntables, and no further orders followed.

The three locomotives served in PKP as Pu29 class, hauling mostly transit trains between Germany and East Prussia. A maximum speed was 110 km/h (68 mph), which could be achieved with 760 tonnes (750 long tons; 840 short tons) train. It could also haul the train of 818 tonnes (810 long tons; 900 short tons) with speed up to 105 km/h (65 mph).

During World War II, two locomotives were captured by the Germans and impressed into service as DRG class 12^{2}, with numbers 201 and 202. The latter locomotive was scrapped in West Germany in 1952. Pu29-2 was captured by the Soviets in Poland in 1939 and converted to broad gauge by 1941, transliterated as ПУ-29 class. Possibly it worked until 1958.

After World War II, Poland reclaimed one locomotive 12 201, former Pu29-3. At first it was mistakenly counted as Pt31-46, and from 1950 as Pu29-1. It served until 1970, then avoided scrapping, and finally was preserved in Warsaw Railway Museum.
