= PKP class Ol49 =

PKP Ol49
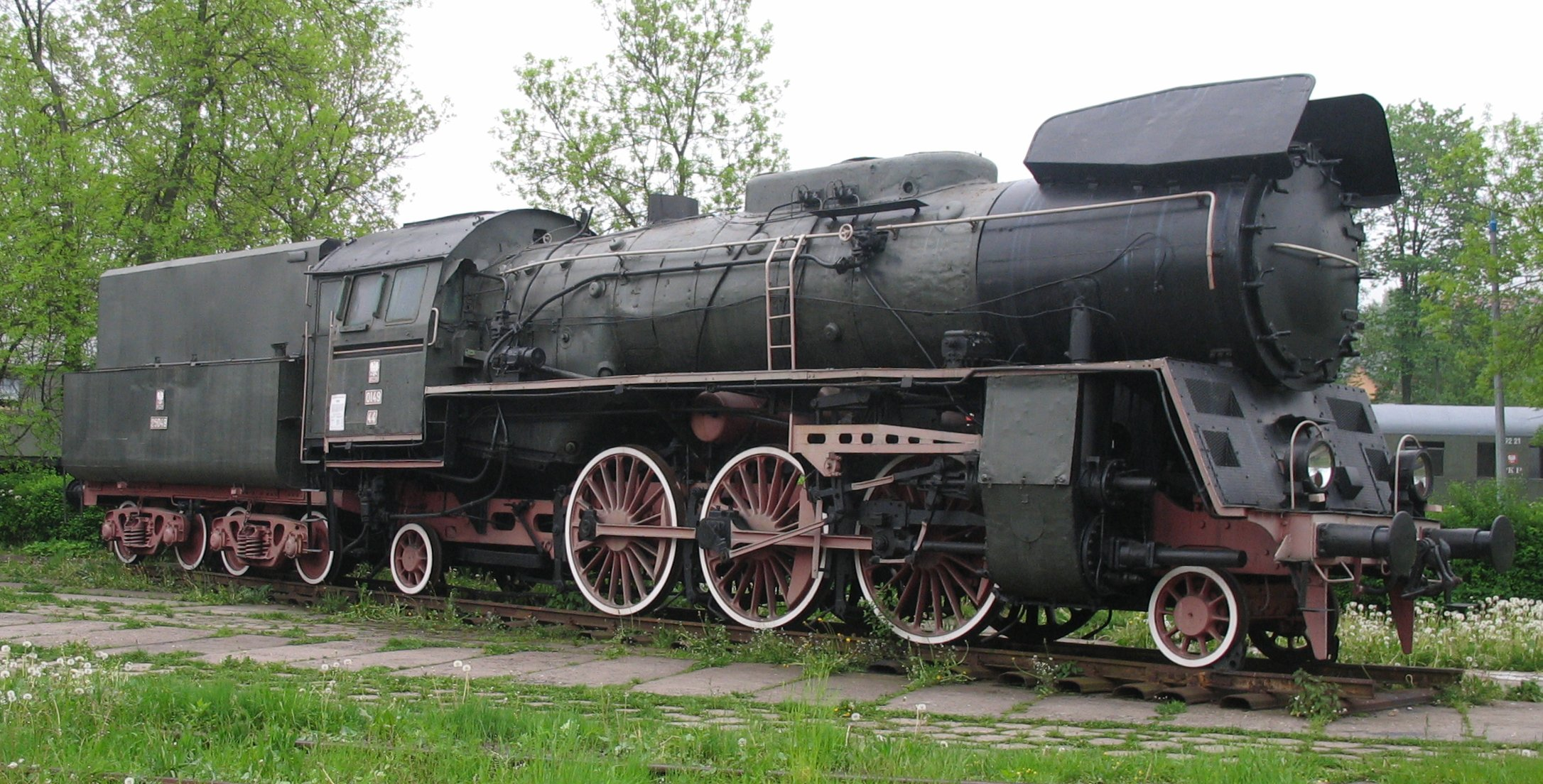
- PKP Ol49-44 in Chabówka
Type and origin
- Power type: Steam
- Builder: Fablok
- Build date: 1949, 1951–1954
- Total produced: 116
Specifications
- Configuration
  - Whyte: 2-6-2
  - UIC: 1′C1′ h2
- Gauge: 1,435 mm (4 ft 8 1/2 in)
- Driver dia.: 1,750 mm (68 7/8 in)
- Adhesive weight: 51.4 tonnes (50.6 long tons; 56.7 short tons)
- Loco weight: 83.5 tonnes (82.2 long tons; 92.0 short tons)
- Fuel type: Coal
- Firebox
  - Grate area: 3.7 m^{2} (40 sq ft)
- Boiler pressure: 16.3 kg/cm^{2} (1.60 MPa; 232 psi)
- Heating surface: 159.4 m^{2} (1,716 sq ft)
- Superheater
  - Heating area: 68.3 m^{2} (735 sq ft)
- Cylinders: Two, outside
- Cylinder size: 500 mm × 630 mm (19 11/16 in × 24 13/16 in)
- Valve gear: Walschaerts
Performance figures
- Tractive effort: 124 kN (27,880 lbf)
Career
- Operators: PKP
- Class: Ol49
- Numbers: Ol49-1 to Ol49-112

PKP class Ol49 is a class of ordinary passenger (O) 2-6-2 (l) steam engine designed in 1949 and used in Poland by the Polskie Koleje Państwowe (Polish State Railways) (PKP). A total of 116 were built between 1951 and 1954, 112 for the PKP and four for export to North Korea, by Fablok in Chrzanów.

They replaced the older Ok1 and Ok22.

Several examples are still in use, based out of Wolsztyn, while others have been mounted at various locations across Poland.

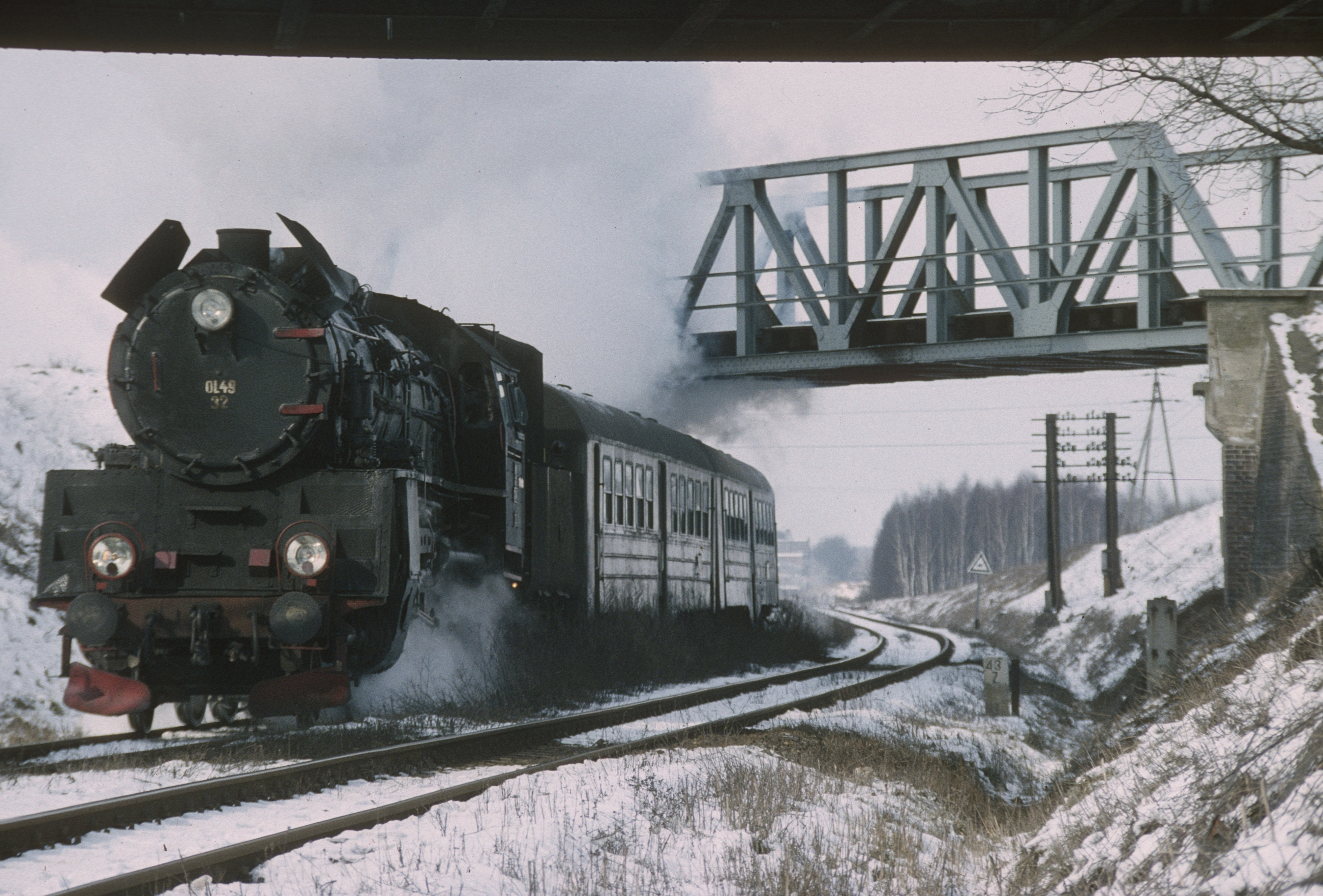
Running passenger service in 1993

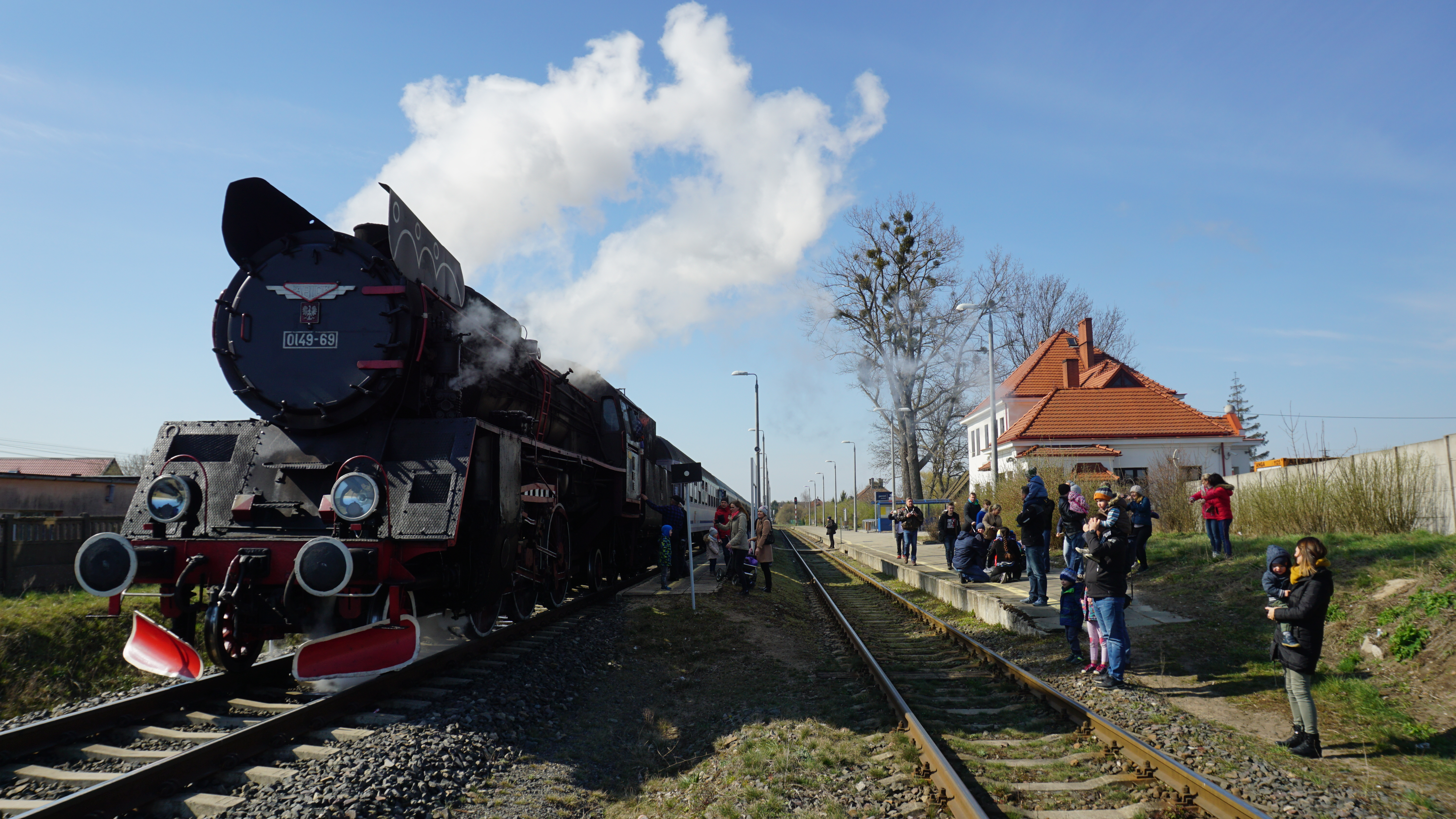
Fablok Ol49-69 at the Żukowo Wschodnie railway station, 2019

== See also ==
- PKP classification system
