= PKP class Pt31 =

PKP Pt31
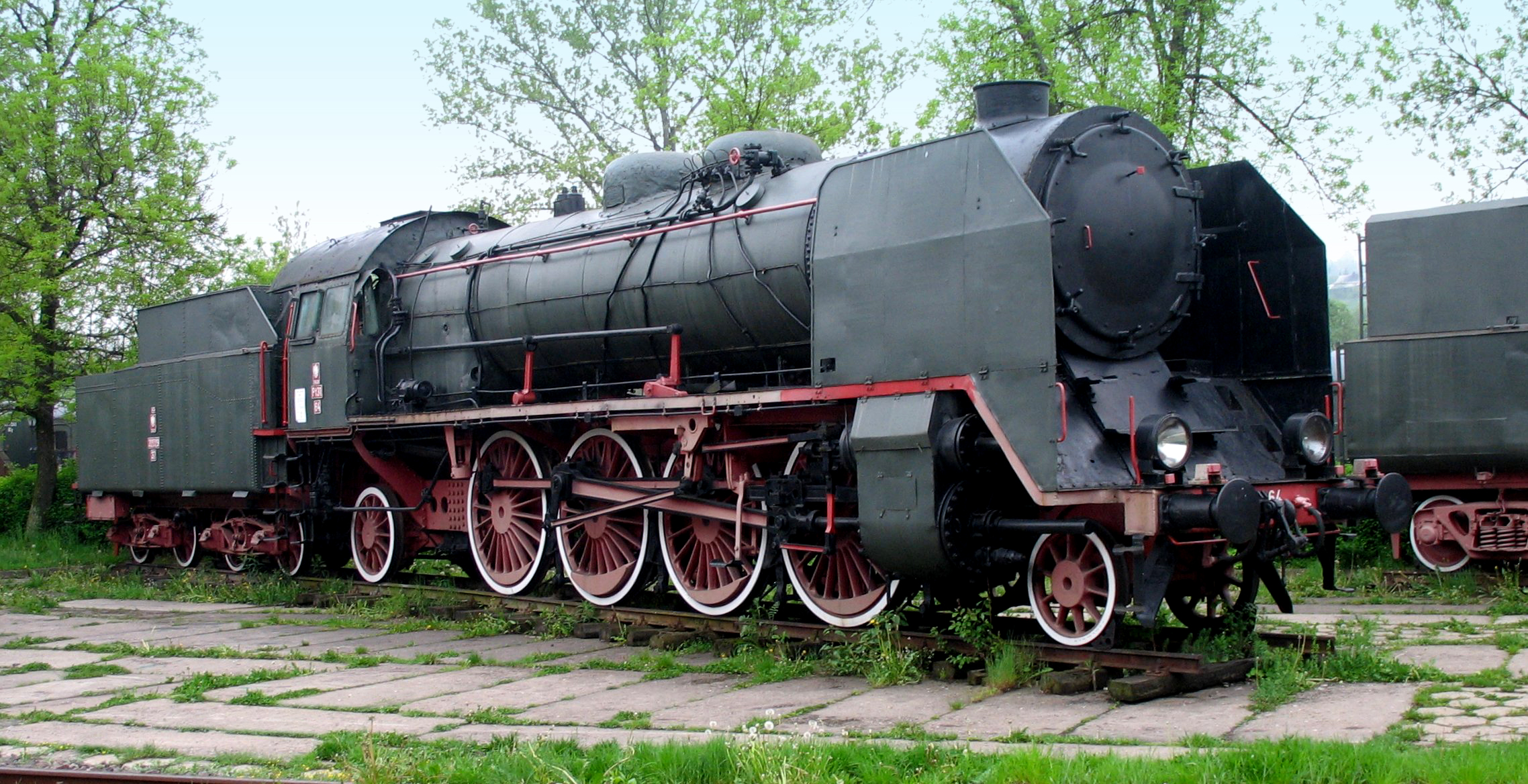
- Pt31 locomotive
Type and origin
- Power type: Steam
- Builder: Fablok
- Build date: 1932–1940
- Total produced: 110
Specifications
- Configuration
  - Whyte: 2-8-2
  - UIC: 1′D1′ h2
- Gauge: 1,435 mm (4 ft 8 1/2 in) standard gauge
- Leading dia.: 1,000 mm (39.37 in)
- Driver dia.: 1,850 mm (72.83 in)
- Trailing dia.: 1,200 mm (47.24 in)
- Tender wheels: 1,000 mm (39.37 in)
- Minimum curve: 150 m (492 ft 2 in)
- Wheelbase
  - Engine: 12.200 m (40 ft 0 in)
  - Drivers: 6.000 m (19 ft 8 in)
  - Tender: 5.600 m (18 ft 4 in)
- Length: 23.955 m (78 ft 7 in) (with tender)
- Height: 4.555 m (14 ft 11 in)
- Axle load: 18.3 tonnes
- Loco weight: 106.2 tonnes
- Tender weight: 68.5 tonnes
- Total weight: 174.7 tonnes
- Tender type: 32D29
- Water cap.: 32 m^{3} (1,100 cu ft)
- Tender cap.: 10.0 tonnes
- Firebox
  - Grate area: 4.51 m^{2} (48.5 sq ft)
- Boiler pressure: 15 kg/cm^{2} (1.47 MPa; 213 psi)
- Heating surface: 234.2 m^{2} (2,521 sq ft)
- Superheater
  - Heating area: 91.46 m^{2} (984.5 sq ft)
- Cylinders: Two, outside
- Cylinder size: 630 mm × 700 mm (24.80 in × 27.56 in)
- Valve gear: Heusinger
Performance figures
- Maximum speed: 110 km/h (68 mph)
- Power output: 2,000 hp (1,500 kW)
- Tractive effort: 13,500 kgf (29,760 lbf)
Career
- Operators: PKP
- Class: Pt31
- Numbers: Pt31-1 to Pt31-98
- Locale: Poland
- Delivered: 1932
- Retired: 1979
- Preserved: 2

PKP Class Pt31 is a Polish steam locomotive of Polskie Koleje Państwowe, designed for hauling heavy long-distance passenger trains, built in 1932-1940. The designation stood for fast passenger (P) 2-8-2 (t) steam locomotive designed in 1931.

The locomotive was entirely Polish design, designed in Fablok in Chrzanów. Polish Ministry of Transport ordered two classes of fast passenger locomotives in Polish factories to compare their merits. Fablok 2-8-2 design was to be named Pt29, but the design was delayed and accepted on in 1931, thus becoming Pt31. Three prototypes were built in 1932 and successfully competed with 4-8-2 Pu29 locomotive - both were similar, but more compact Pt31 better suited Polish turntables. From 1934, a series production for the PKP followed, and by the outbreak of World War II in 1939, 98 were made, numbered Pt31-1 to 98. Further twelve were completed in 1940 under German occupation.

Pt31 became the strongest machines hauling long-distance passenger trains in Poland. A maximum speed was 110 km/h (68 mph). It could achieve at least 105 km/h with a train of 600 tonnes (590 long tons; 660 short tons), or could haul the train of 810 tonnes (800 long tons; 890 short tons) with lower speed.

During the war, 54 locomotives were captured by the Germans and impressed into service as DR class 19^{1}, with numbers 101 to 154. Further twelve were first designated as class 39^{10}, finally class 19^{1}, with numbers 155 to 166. Remaining 44 Pt31 locomotives were captured by the Soviets in Poland, 21 of them had been converted to broad gauge by 1941, transliterated as ПТ-31 class. A number of Soviet locomotives were captured again by the Germans from 1941, and received German numbers up to 180.

After World War II, Poland reclaimed 65 locomotives, receiving new numbers Pt31-1 to 66 (number 46 was mistakenly assigned to Pu29-3). Before that, they temporarilly served in Czechoslovakia as class 488, Austria, Hungary and both German countries. Three locomotives of wartime production remained on Austrian railways as ÖBB class 919 until 1961, and several broad-gauge remained in the Soviet Union.

These locomotives were used until 1979 in Poland. Only two were preserved, in non-working condition. A post-war development was PKP class Pt47.
