= PKP class Ok22 =

Class of 190 Polish 4-6-0 locomotives

PKP Ok22
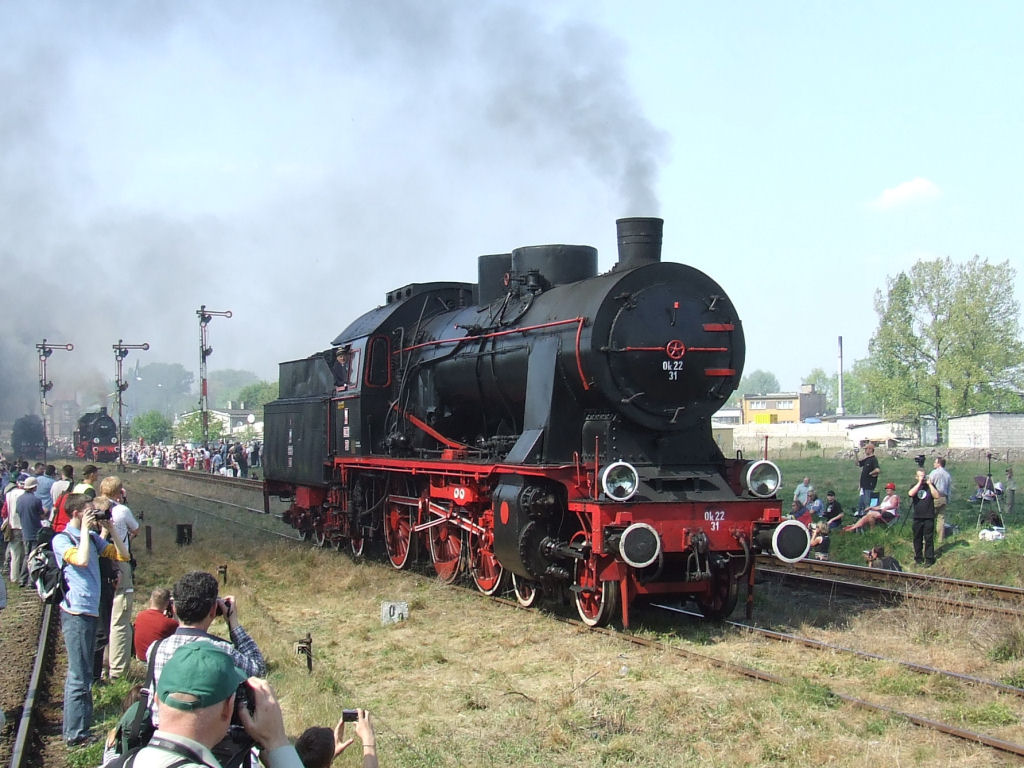
- Ok22-31 in Wolsztyn
Type and origin
- Power type: Steam
- Builder: Hanomag (5); Fablok (185)
- Build date: 1923, 1928–1934
- Total produced: 190
Specifications
- Configuration
  - Whyte: 4-6-0
  - UIC: 2′C h2
- Gauge: 1,435 mm (4 ft 8 1/2 in) standard gauge 1,524 mm (5 ft); Russian Railways
- Leading dia.: 1,000 mm (39.37 in)
- Driver dia.: 1,750 mm (68.90 in)
- Wheelbase: 8.350 m (27 ft 4 3/4 in)
- Length: 18.612 m (61 ft 3/4 in); 18.940 m (62 ft 1 5/8 in)
- Height: 4.625 m (15 ft 2 1/8 in)
- Axle load: 17 tonnes (17 long tons; 19 short tons)
- Adhesive weight: 51.0 tonnes (50.2 long tons; 56.2 short tons)
- Loco weight: 78.9 tonnes (77.7 long tons; 87.0 short tons)
- Tender weight: 50 tonnes (49 long tons; 55 short tons)
- Tender cap.: 10 t (9.8 long tons; 11 short tons)
- Firebox
  - Grate area: 4.01 m^{2} (43.2 sq ft)
- Boiler pressure: 12 kg/cm^{2} (1.2 MPa; 170 psi)
- Heating surface
  - Firebox: 14.1 m^{2} (152 sq ft)
  - Total surface: 182.1 m^{2} (1,960 sq ft)
- Superheater
  - Heating area: 61.6 m^{2} (663 sq ft)
- Cylinders: Two, outside
- Cylinder size: 575 mm × 630 mm (22.6 in × 24.8 in)
Performance figures
- Tractive effort: 123 kN (27,650 lbf)
Career
- Operators: PKP » DRB » PKP
- Class: PKP: Ok22; DRB: 38^{45}
- Numbers: PKP: Ok22-1 to Ok-22-190; DRB: 38 4501 to 38 4630
- Disposition: Two preserved, remainder scrapped

PKP class Ok22 is a class of ordinary passenger (O) 4-6-0 (k) steam locomotive designed in 1922 for Polskie Koleje Państwowe (Polish State Railways, PKP). It was the first locomotive designed in Poland after World War I, so the design work was done jointly with Hanomag, based on the Prussian P 8 (PKP class Ok1)

== History ==
=== Introduction ===
The first five engines were built in Germany by Hanomag in 1923. Polish production started in 1928 and lasted until 1934 after which 185 locomotives had been manufactured by Fablok in Chrzanów. The first Polish-built locomotive (Ok22-6) was ready on December 31, 1928. Polish versions of the locomotive bore some improvements and changes compared with German ones, and were similar to PKP class Ty23. Ok22 locomotives were the first on the PKP to be equipped with electric lights.

=== Wartime ===
After the German invasion of Poland in World War II, most Ok22 locomotives were taken into the Deutsche Reichsbahn fleet as 38 4501 to 38 4630.

=== Present day ===
Only two examples have survived. Ok22-23 in Jaworzyna Śląska and Ok22-31 in Wolsztyn. Ok22-31 was an operational engine. It ran until 1997, and after retirement became a stationary exhibit. In 2004 the machine was restored to working order again, and it ran until 2009. It is currently static.

== See also ==
- PKP classification system
