= PKP class Ty2 =

PKP Ty2 and Ty42
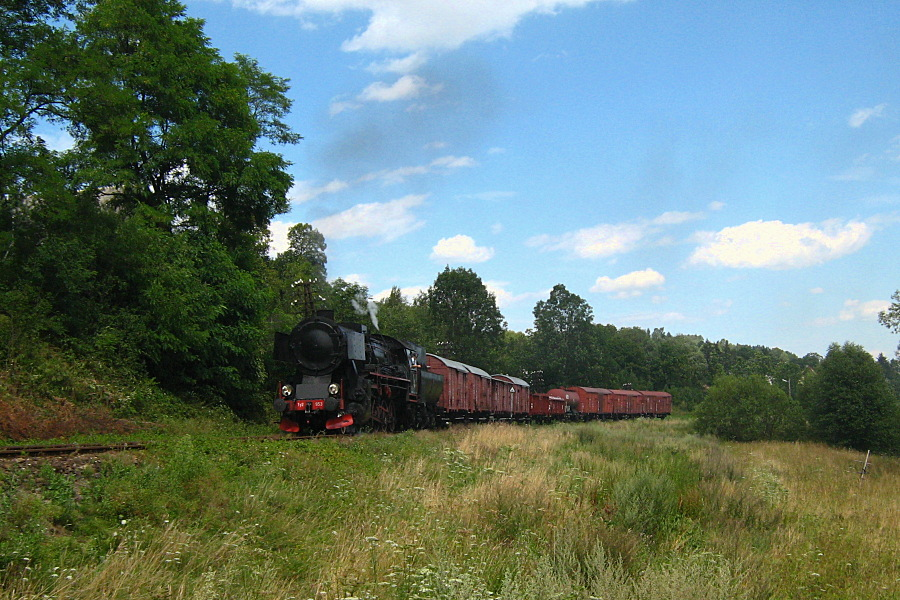
- Ty2-953 with a freight train in 2007
Type and origin
- Power type: Steam
- Builder: Various, mostly members of Gemeinschaft Grossdeutscher Lokomotivhersteller, including Henschel, LOFAG, Schwartzkopff, among others
- Model: DRB Class 52
- Build date: 1942 – ca.1950
- Total produced: c. 7794 about 1,425 of which in Poland
Specifications
- Configuration
  - Whyte: 2-10-0
  - UIC: 1′E h2
- Gauge: 1,435 mm (4 ft 8 1/2 in)
- Leading dia.: 850 mm (33.46 in)
- Driver dia.: 1,400 mm (55.12 in)
- Length: 22.975 m (75 ft 5 in)
- Loco weight: 84.0 tonnes (82.7 long tons; 92.6 short tons)
- Fuel type: Coal
- Tender cap.: 10.0 tonnes (9.8 long tons; 11.0 short tons)
- Firebox
  - Grate area: 2.6 m^{2} (28 sq ft)
- Boiler pressure: 16 kg/cm^{2} (1.57 MPa; 228 psi)
- Cylinders: Two, outside
- Cylinder size: 600 mm × 660 mm (23.62 in × 25.98 in)
- Loco brake: Air
- Train brakes: Air
Performance figures
- Maximum speed: 80 km/h (50 mph)
- Tractive effort: 233 kN (52,380 lbf)
Career
- Operators: DRB » PKP
- Class: DRB: 52; PKP: Ty42 (new), Ty2 (ex-DRB)

PKP classes Ty2 and Ty42 is a class of freight (T) 2-10-0 (y) steam locomotive used by Polskie Koleje Państwowe (Polish State Railways, PKP) from 1942 (42) onwards. They are Deutsche Reichsbahn class 52 Kriegslokomotiven (war locomotives), either acquired new (Ty42), or secondhand (Ty2), having been built during World War II in factories in many European countries (Germany and occupied countries, including Poland) in 1942–1945.

== History ==
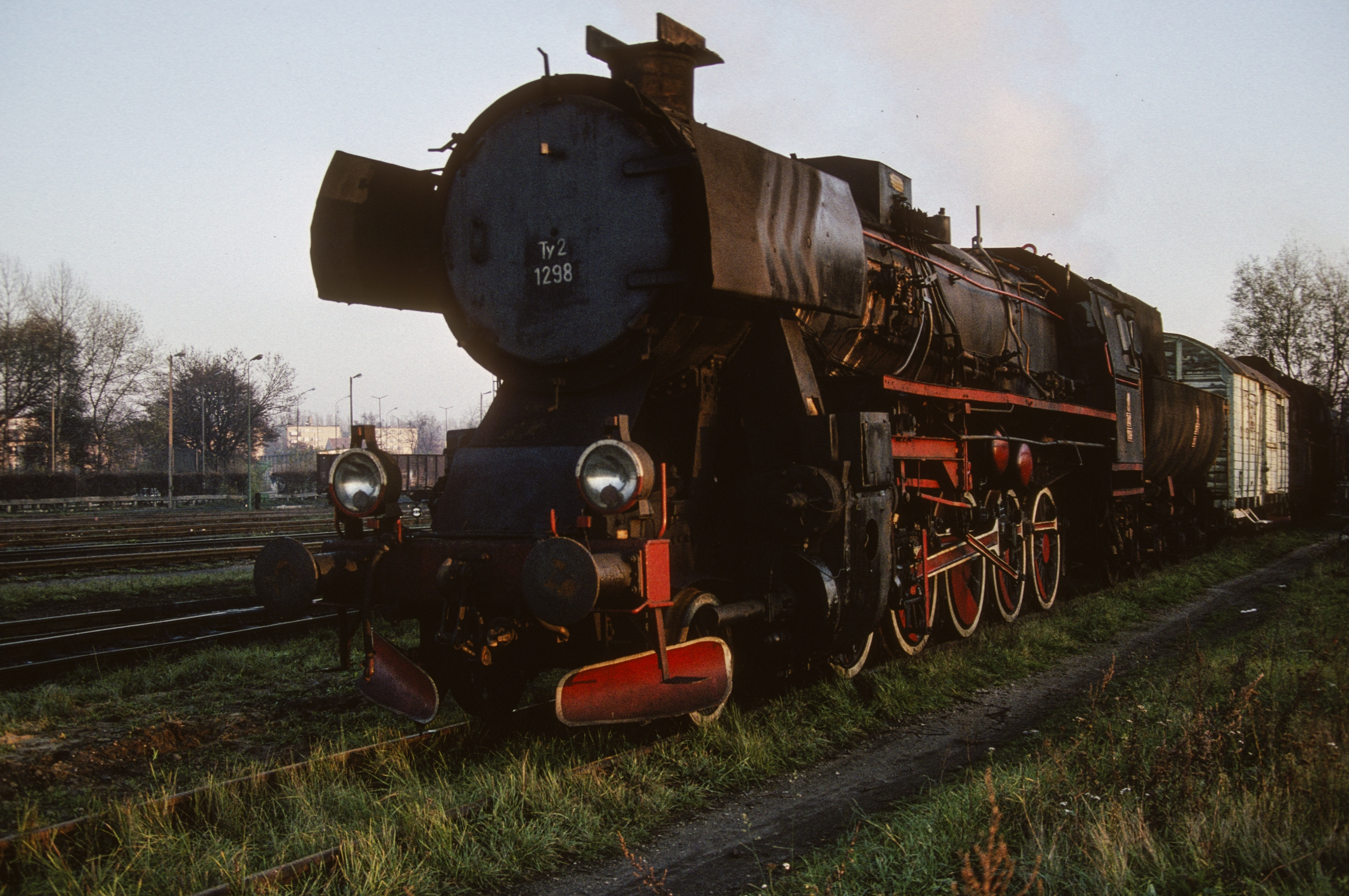
PKP Ty2 in 1989

The purpose of this simplified, cheaper to manufacture and reliable locomotive was to operate rail routes in the territories acquired by the Third Reich in the east. Therefore, these locomotives have excellent thermal insulation and an axle load of no more than 15 tonnes (15 long tons; 17 short tons), allowing them to navigate the lines with poor or temporarily repaired tracks.

After the defeat of the Third Reich, 1207 locomotives of this series were inherited by the PKP. In 1962, Poland, due to an insufficient quantity of locomotives, had been forced to buy 220 machines from the Soviet Union. Two hundred of them were incorporated into the class, and 20 purchased from PMP PW Katowice. PKP locomotives renumbered the locomotives Ty2-1208 to 1407, while the PW PMP locomotives kept the last four digits of their German number.

From 1945 until the end of steam traction operation, the Ty2 was the largest series of locomotives in Poland. 54 locomotives of this series are still in Poland today, including examples active in the Open Air Museum of rolling stock and railway equipment in Chabowka: the Ty2-911 (major repair July 2007) and the Ty2-953 (major repair April 2006). Ty2-953, among others, took part in the celebration of the 150th anniversary of railways in the Rybnik on 1 October 2006 and the 150th anniversary of the station in Tarnowskie Góry on 17 June 2007.

== Traction capabilities ==
Ty2 class locomotives during start-up developed a theoretical tractive force of about 233 kN (52,380 lbf). Examples with good quality coal could pull trains weighing 620 tonnes (610 long tons; 680 short tons) at 80 km/h (50 mph) or 1,700 tonnes (1,700 long tons; 1,900 short tons) at 50 km/h (31 mph) In mountainous areas, on grades of 20‰ (1 in 50), they could pull 190 tonnes (190 long tons; 210 short tons) at 40 km/h (25 mph); or 130 tonnes (130 long tons; 140 short tons) at the same speed on 25‰ (1 in 40) grades.
