= PKP class Ok1 =

Ok1
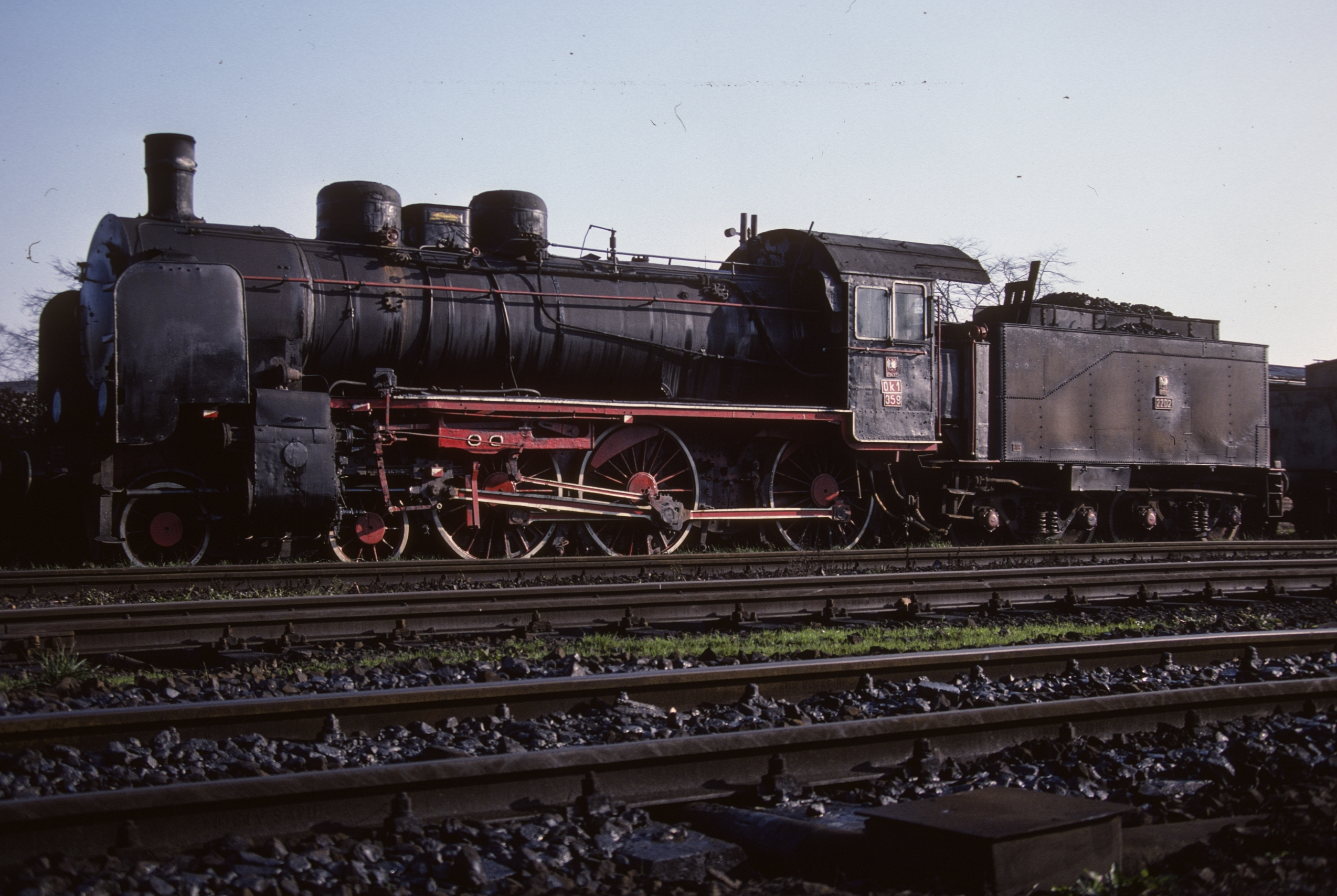
- Ok1-359 in 1989
Type and origin
- Power type: Steam
- Builder: Schwartzkopff; Linke-Hofmann
- Build date: 1908–1928
Specifications
- Configuration
  - Whyte: 4-6-0
  - UIC: 2′C h2
- Gauge: 1,435 mm (4 ft 8 1/2 in) standard gauge
- Leading dia.: 1,000 mm (39.37 in)
- Driver dia.: 1,750 mm (68.90 in)
- Length: 18,585 mm (60 ft 11 3/4 in)
- Height: 4.550 m (14 ft 11 in)
- Axle load: 16.6–17.3 tonnes (16.3–17.0 long tons; 18.3–19.1 short tons)
- Adhesive weight: 50.6 tonnes (49.8 long tons; 55.8 short tons)
- Loco weight: 78.2 tonnes (77.0 long tons; 86.2 short tons)
- Fuel type: Coal
- Fuel capacity: 7.0 tonnes (6.9 long tons; 7.7 short tons)
- Firebox
  - Grate area: 14.28 m^{2} (153.7 sq ft)
- Boiler pressure: 1.2 MPa (170 lbf/in^{2})
- Heating surface
  - Firebox: 2.64 m^{2} (28.4 sq ft)
- Cylinders: 2 x, outside
- Cylinder size: 575 mm × 630 mm (22.64 in × 24.80 in)
- Valve gear: Heusinger
- Loco brake: Knorr Air Brakes
- Train brakes: Knorr Air Brakes
Performance figures
- Maximum speed: 100 kph 62 mph
Career
- Operators: PKP
- Class: Ok1

Ok1 is the Polish designation of a Prussian steam locomotive, the Prussian P 8, used on Polish State Railways. Production of the P 8 lasted from 1908 until 1928 and this locomotive was used on practically all European railway lines.

After the end of World War I, 192 Class P 8 engines were handed over as a reparation to Poland, including two machines for Free City of Danzig, where they were re-designated as Class Ok1 locomotives (numbers: Ok1-1 to Ok1-190 and Ok1-1Dz and 2Dz for Danzig machines). Since the class was considered successful, further 65 locomotives were built in Germany at Polish order in 1922-1923 (designated Ok1-201 to 265).

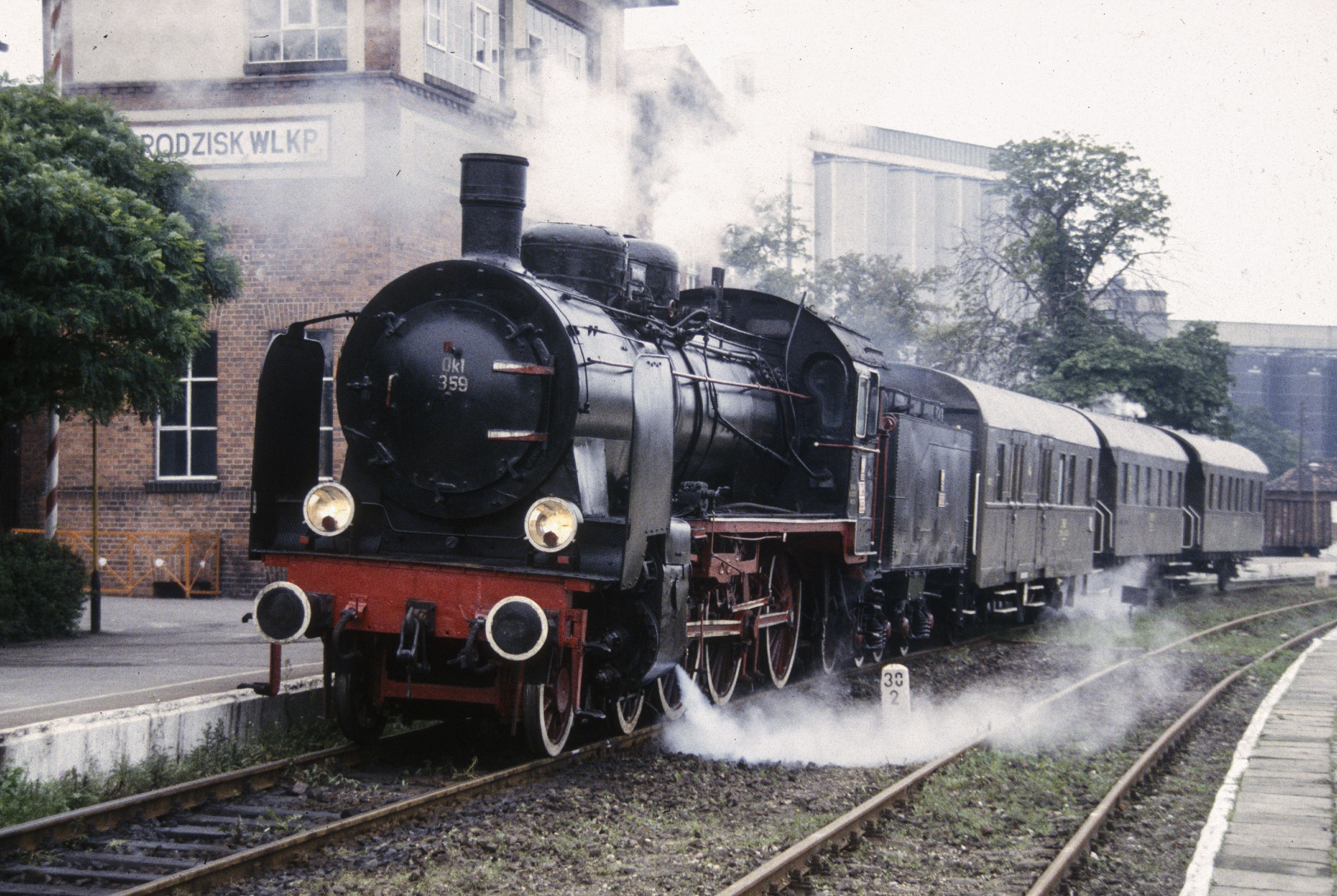
An Ok1 running passenger service in 1993

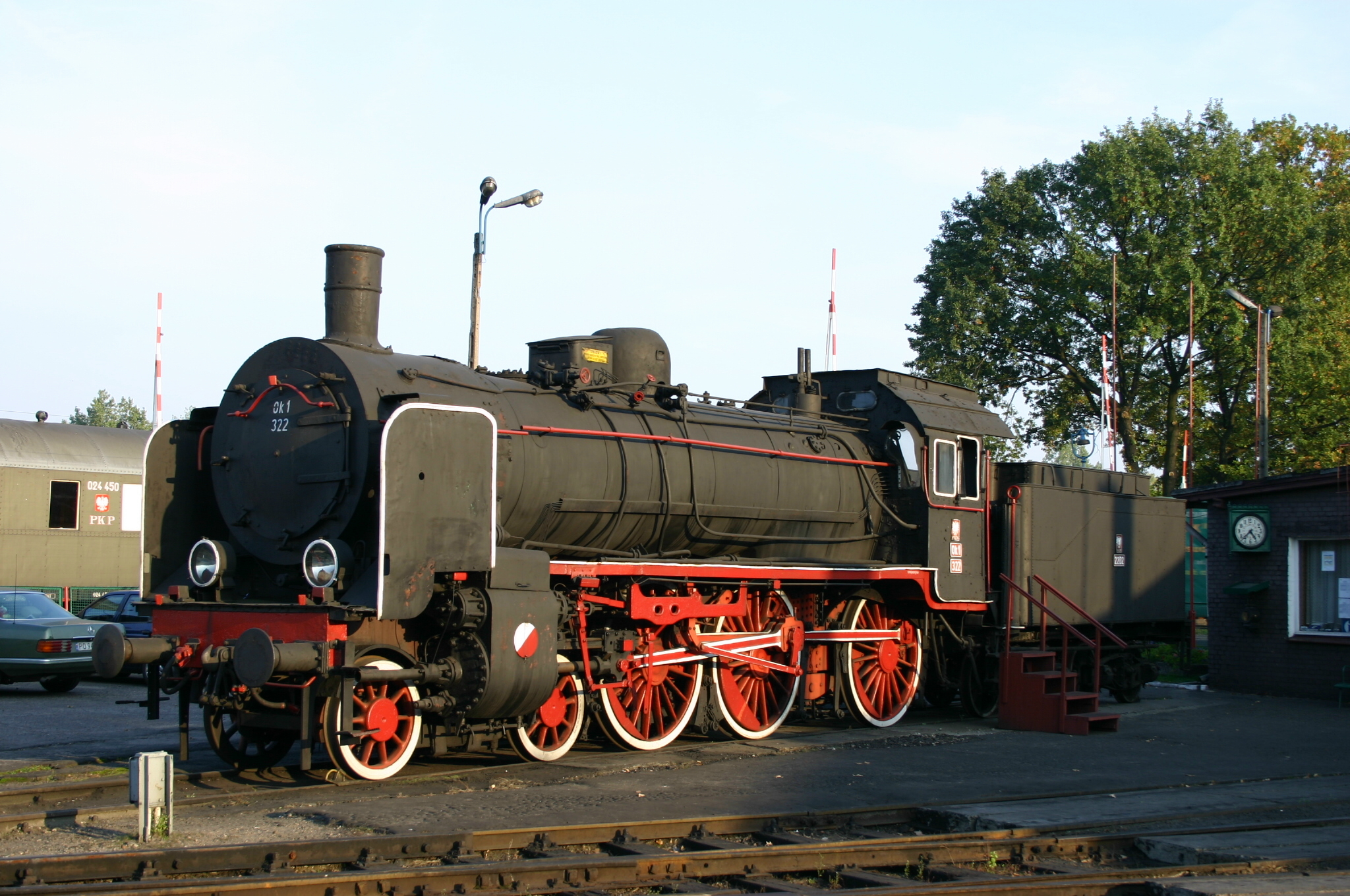
Ok1-359 in Wolsztyn

During World War II all the locomotives were captured by the Germans or Soviets and most were pressed into the German Railways. After the war, along with new war reparations, Poland received 429 locomotives P 8 (numbers Ok1-1 to 429), what made it by far the most numerous passenger locomotive in the country. They were used until the late 1970s - last locomotive was withdrawn from line service in 1981. A few engines were preserved, including Ok1-359 (see the photograph), which is stabled at the Wolsztyn museum.

== See also ==
- PKP classification system
