= Tabor Railway Vehicle Institute =

Polish research institute

- Instytut Pojazdów Szynowych „Tabor”
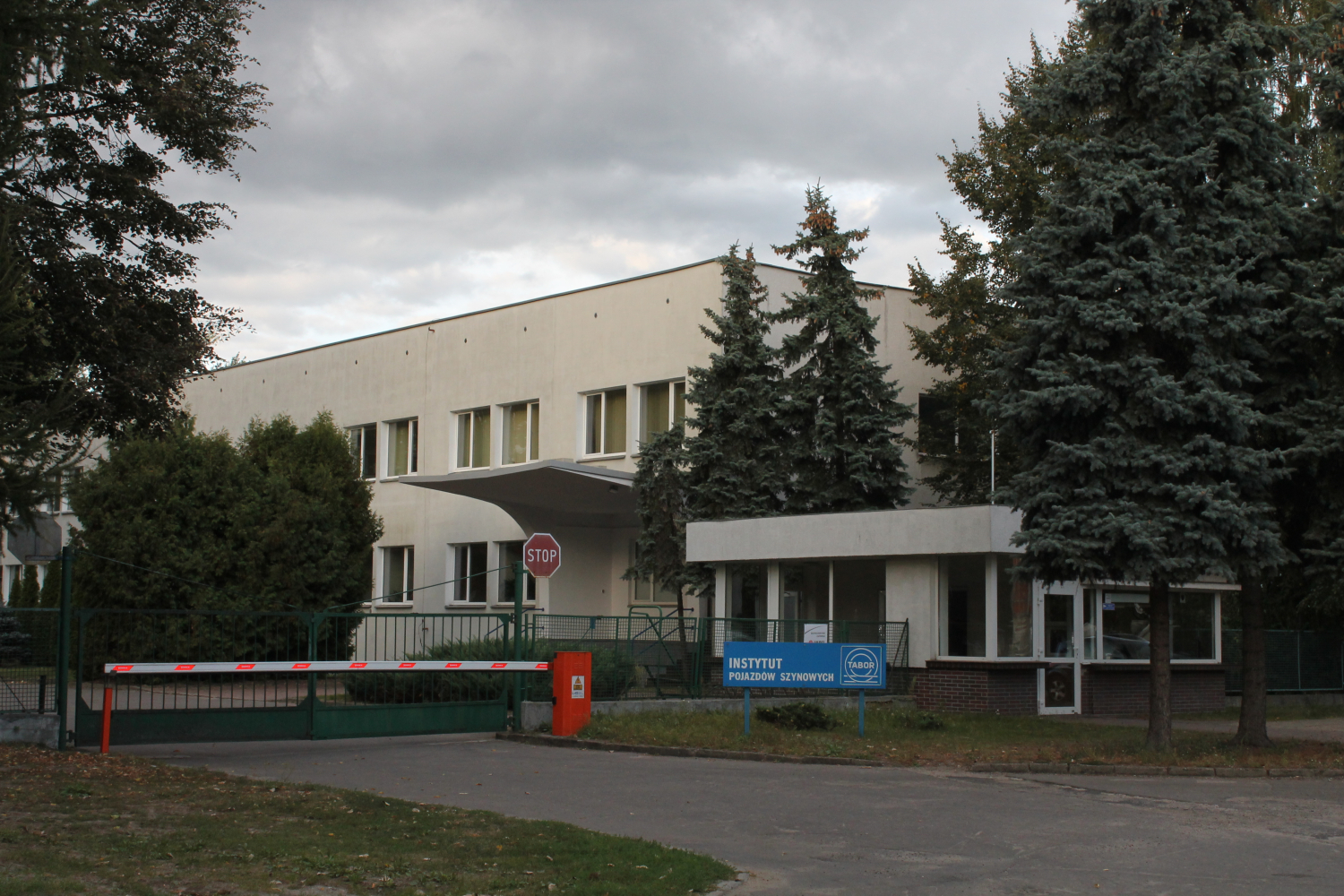
- Entrance gate to the institute grounds (2015)
- Type: research institute
- Active: September 1, 1945–January 1, 2022
- Address: 181 Warszawska Street, Poznań, Poland; 52°24′43″N 16°59′42″E

The Tabor Railway Vehicle Institute (Polish: Instytut Pojazdów Szynowych „Tabor”) was a research unit that operated from 1945 to 2022, carrying out comprehensive work related to the design, construction, and testing of rail vehicles.

The unit was established on 1 September 1945 in Poznań as a result of the separation of the design office from the structures of H. Cegielski – Poznań. During the Polish People's Republic era, the center completed over 280 vehicle designs, based on which the Polish industry produced rolling stock for the Polish State Railways, industrial railways, and export. On 1 April 2019, the Tabor Railway Vehicle Institute became part of the Łukasiewicz Research Network, and on 1 January 2022, it was integrated into the Łukasiewicz Research Network – Poznań Institute of Technology, where it was renamed the Rail Vehicle Center. Since 1 January 2024, it has been operating within the Center of Modern Mobility and the Center of Laboratory Research of this institute.

== History ==
In February 1945, even before the end of World War II, the pre-war rolling stock design office of H. Cegielski – Poznań resumed its activities under the name Plant Design Office of the H. Cegielski Works. By 1 March, the staff numbered nine people, including two designers. In April, the expanded team allowed for the establishment of a steam locomotive design department, a wagon design department, as well as a secretariat, an archive, and a technical library.

In June 1945, a commission from the Ministry of Communications arrived in Poznań to determine Poland's needs for rolling stock as the country was rebuilding from wartime destruction. The most urgent priorities were identified as the design of freight steam locomotives and coal wagons, which were assigned to the H. Cegielski's design office. Since these matters extended beyond the scope of the plant's production, on 1 September 1945, the office was separated from the company's structure and directly subordinated to the Tasko Rolling Stock Industry Union, which had been established by ministerial decree on 5 June 1945. The new entity was named Central Design Office, and its role was to develop design documentation for rail vehicles for all rolling stock manufacturers under the Tasko Union and to collaborate with their design offices. Central Design Office also continued the pre-war system of assigning type designations to new constructions, as developed by the technical office of H. Cegielski. In the following years, the locomotive and wagon design departments were joined by departments for studies and standardization, as well as administrative divisions. On 1 January 1949, by order of the Minister of Industry and Trade issued on 15 September 1948, Central Design Office was transformed into a separate enterprise under the name Central Design Office No. 1.

On 1 January 1951, the office was restructured into a state-owned enterprise named Central Design Office of the Rolling Stock Industry, reporting to the Central Directorate of the Rolling Stock Industry in Poznań and the Ministry of Machine Industry in Warsaw. Initially, the entity focused primarily on designing steam locomotives, while also determining the development directions for rail vehicle design by preparing specifications, preliminary designs, and technical documentation. In 1963, the industry standard BN-63/3500-03 expanded the previously used system for assigning construction types, and the Poznań-based office was authorized to manage these designations. Due to shortages of personnel, technical resources, and organizational capacity in factory-based design offices, Central Design Office of the Rolling Stock Industry was responsible for developing the documentation for all complex projects, from preliminary concepts to complete design documentation. From 1965 onward, some of these responsibilities were gradually transferred to factory offices, which started hiring engineers educated at domestic technical universities.

By the 1970s, designing new rail vehicles had become increasingly difficult without a proper research base, scientific studies, and structural modeling. As a result, in 1971, Central Design Office of the Rolling Stock Industry initiated the construction of a laboratory, a research hall equipped with test stands, and a dedicated prototype department. Plans were made to transform the office into the Central Research and Design Center for the Rolling Stock Industry by the turn of 1972 and 1973. At that time, the previous practice of installing only prototype components in prototype vehicles was also abandoned.

In mid-1973, organizational changes took place, and on 1 July 1973, the Central Design Office of the Rolling Stock Industry was transformed into a research and development unit named Research and Development Center for Rail Vehicles. A scientific council was established, and in 1975, the quarterly scientific-technical journal Pojazdy Szynowe was first published. In 1975, operations began on facilities that had been under construction since 1971. Efforts were made to create an independent research base enabling the testing of complete vehicles, their systems, components, and construction elements. In 1976, research tasks began, and in 1981, the center became independent following the liquidation of the Tasko Union. That same year, due to martial law, the publication of Pojazdy Szynowe was halted, and in 1992, the center's employees started publishing their articles in the section by the same name in Przegląd Mechaniczny. In 1998, Pojazdy Szynowe was revived, and the following year, the center's laboratory received accreditation from the German Eisenbahn-Bundesamt.

On 25 April 2000, the Research and Development Center for Rail Vehicles was transformed by ministerial decree into the Tabor Railway Vehicle Institute, and from then on, it was overseen by the Ministry of Economy. On 29 October 2001, the institute was registered in the National Court Register under the number 0000056924. In early 2002, Polish State Railways established an internal standard ZN-02/PKP-3500-16 updating the principles of vehicle type assignment, without including any reference to the Tabor Railway Vehicle Institute being authorized to assign these designations. The institute operated under the Act on Research and Development Units of 25 July 1985 until 30 September 2010. From 1 October 2010, it began operating under the Act on Research Institutes of 30 April 2010. On 8 December 2015, the unit came under the supervision of the Ministry of Development.

In early September 2016, Jarosław Gowin, the Minister of Science and Higher Education, presented a strategy that included the reform of research institutes and the creation of the National Technological Institute. By mid-April 2017, a bill on the National Technological Institute had been submitted to the Government Legislation Center, according to which this institute would be established by merging 35 research institutes, including the Tabor Railway Vehicle Institute. On 13 April 2018, Tabor Railway Vehicle Institute became an organizational unit under the Ministry of Entrepreneurship and Technology. On 1 April 2019, the Łukasiewicz Research Network was established, incorporating the Tabor Railway Vehicle Institute along with 37 other entities. On 15 May, the institute changed its name to Łukasiewicz Research Network – Tabor Railway Vehicle Institute. On 25 September 2020, the institute was registered in the National Court Register under the number 0000861589, replacing the old entry under 0000056924, and was overseen by the president of the Łukasiewicz Center with a newly approved statute.

At the turn of 2020 and 2021, the Łukasiewicz Research Network – Tabor Railway Vehicle Institute and four other Poznań-based Łukasiewicz institutes began analyzing the potential effects of merging these entities. Preparatory work, led by Arkadiusz Kawa, who was the acting director of the Tabor Railway Vehicle Institute at the time, showed that creating a single multidisciplinary research entity would increase both the research and commercialization potential. On 1 January 2022, the Łukasiewicz Research Network – Poznań Institute of Technology began its activities, transforming Tabor Railway Vehicle Institute into one of six research centers within this institute: the Rail Vehicle Center under the leadership of Piotr Michalak. On 22 February, Tabor Railway Vehicle Institute was removed as a separate institution from the National Court Register.

On 1 January 2024, the organizational structure of the Łukasiewicz Research Network – Poznań Institute of Technology was reorganized, creating new interdisciplinary research centers. The former Rail Vehicle Center continues its operations within the Center of Modern Mobility and the Center of Laboratory Research.

== Activity ==
The Tabor Railway Vehicle Institute was involved in:

- Conducting stationary and operational tests of railway rolling stock,
- Designing:
  - Railway vehicles,
  - Rail-road vehicles,
  - Vehicle systems and components,
  - A bimodal system for combined rail-road transport,
- Producing prototypes of components and subcomponents for railway vehicles,
- Certifying products for rail transport and inspecting railway system elements,
- Editing and publishing the scientific and technical quarterly Pojazdy Szynowe.

=== Railway vehicle projects ===
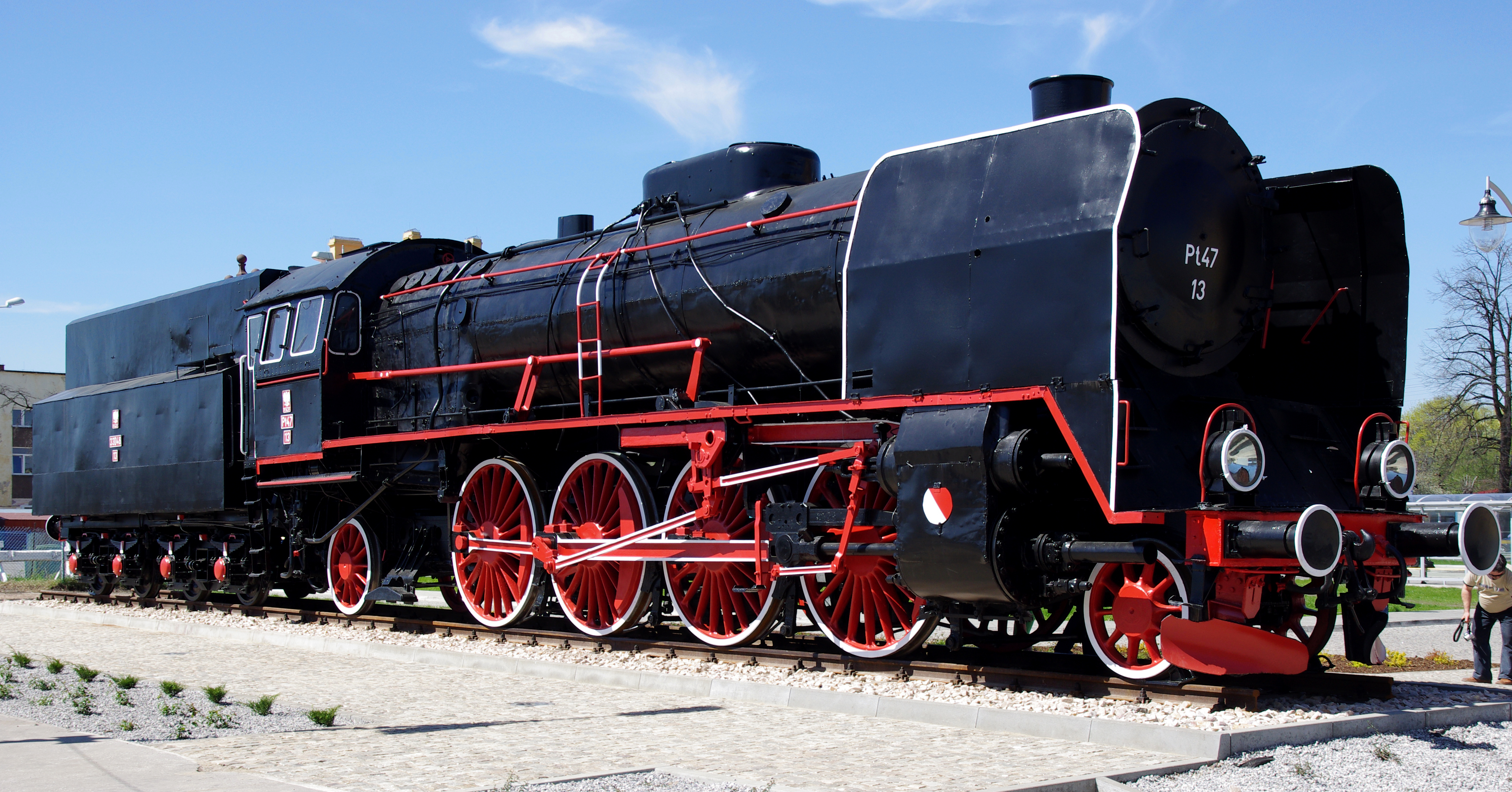
Pt47 series steam locomotive

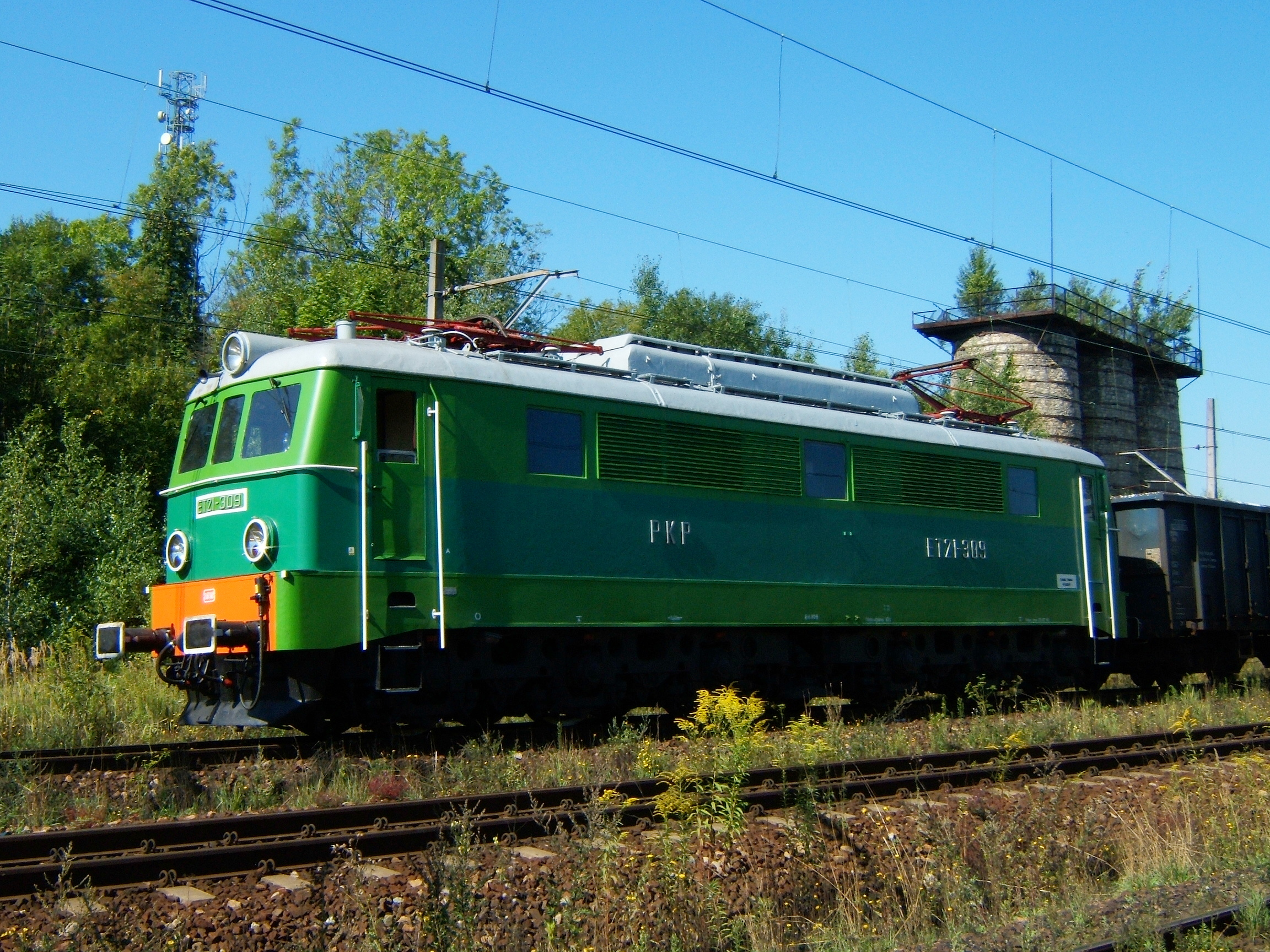
3E type electric locomotive

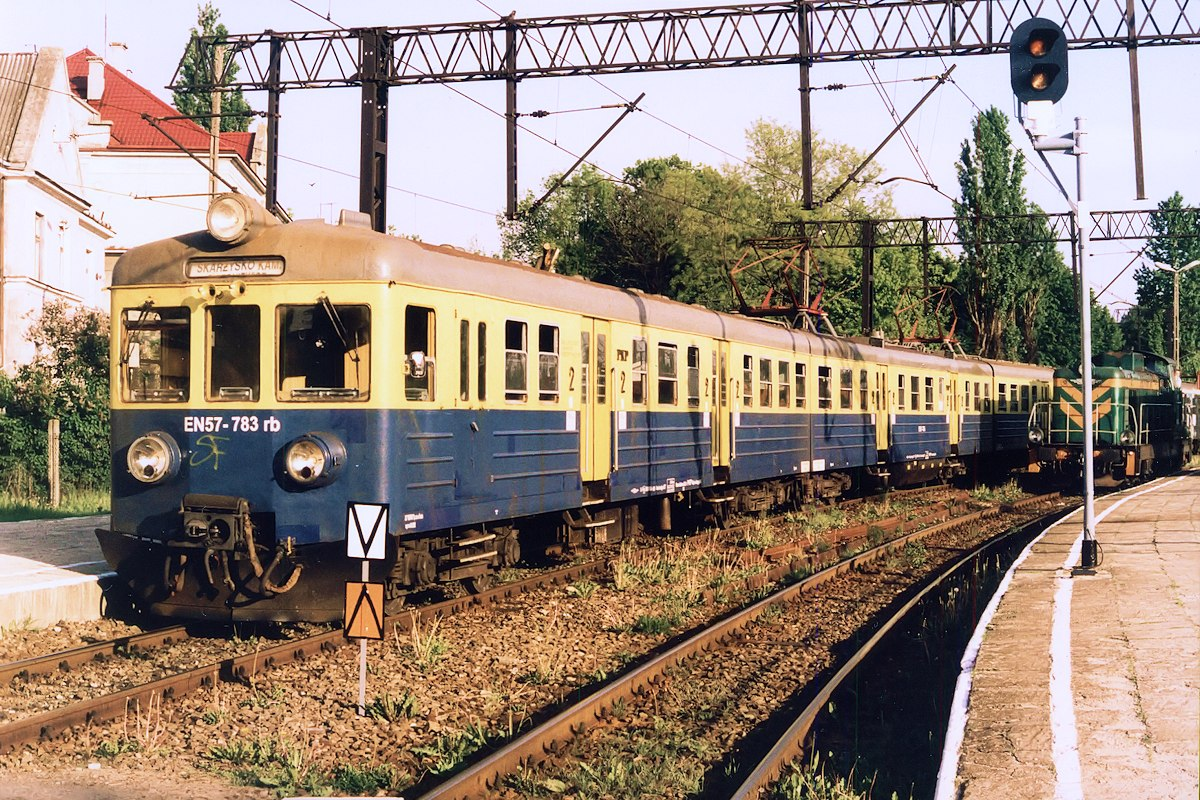
5B/6B type electric multiple unit

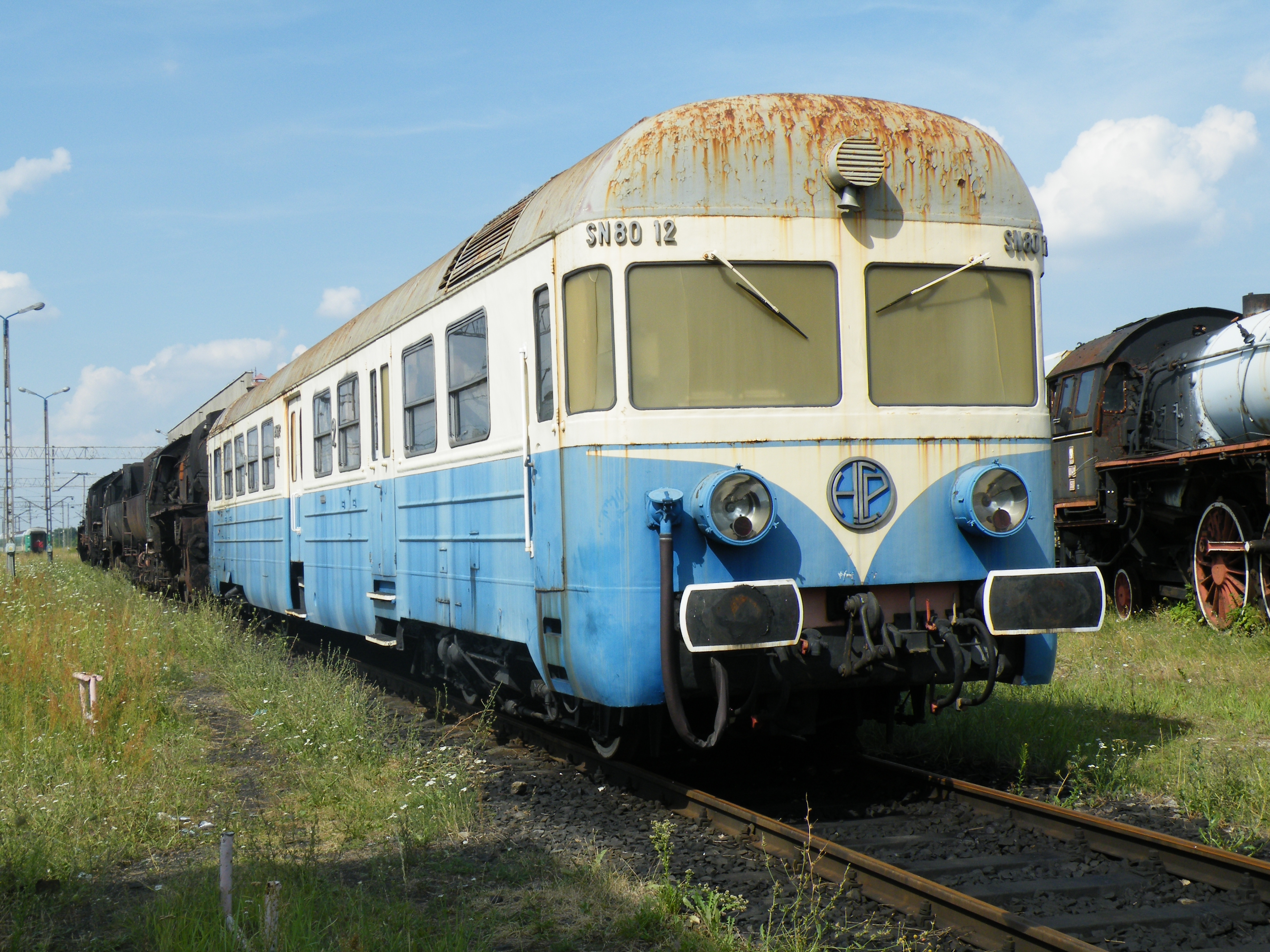
5M type diesel railcar

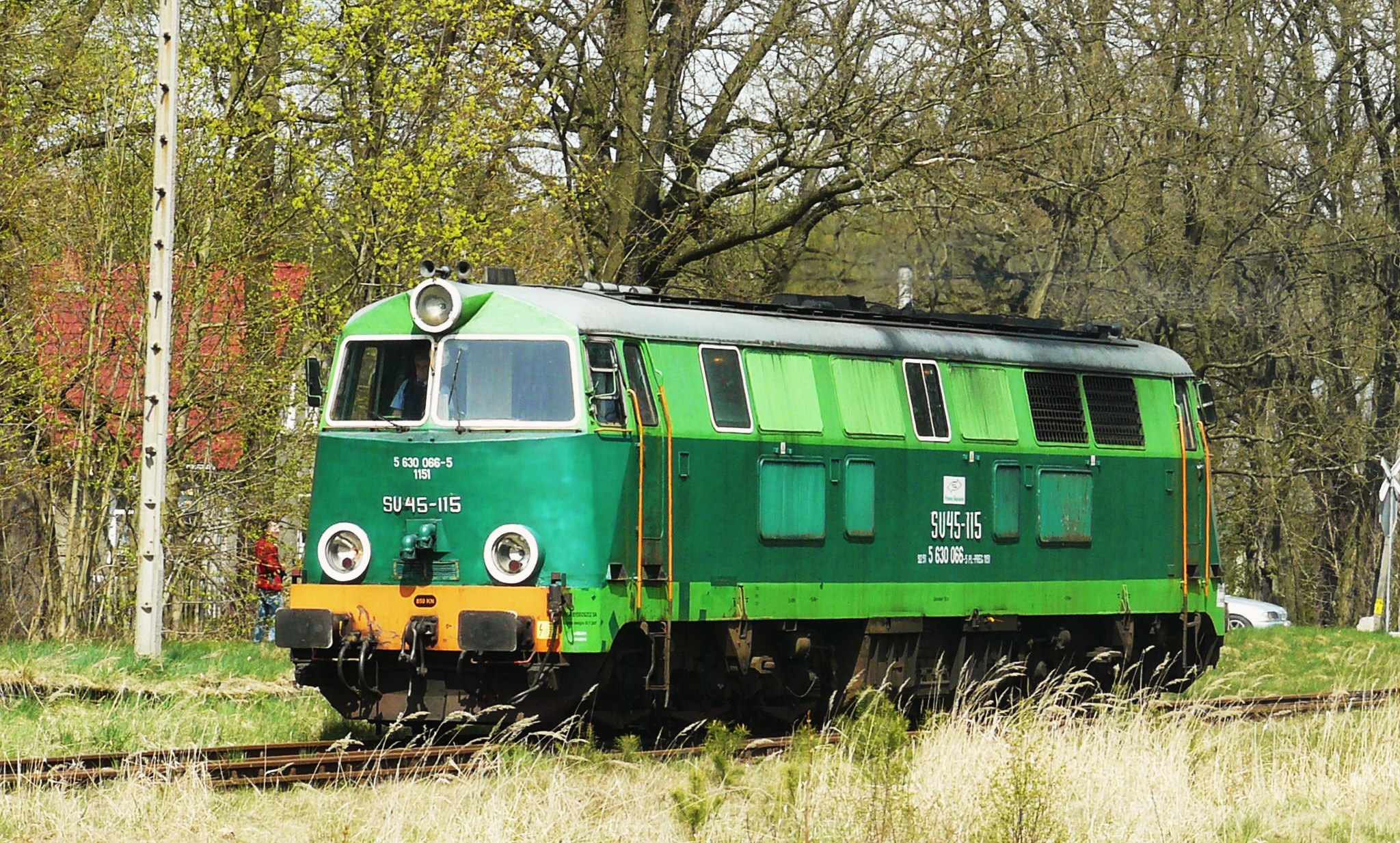
301Db type diesel locomotive

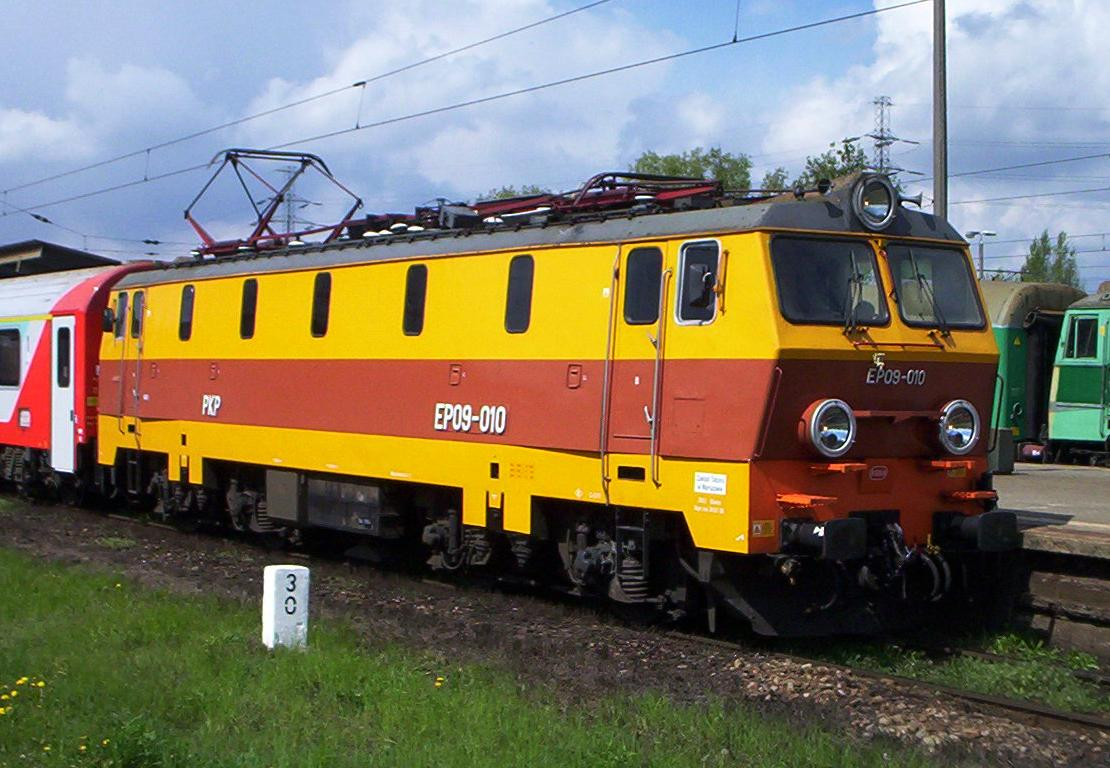
104E type electric locomotive

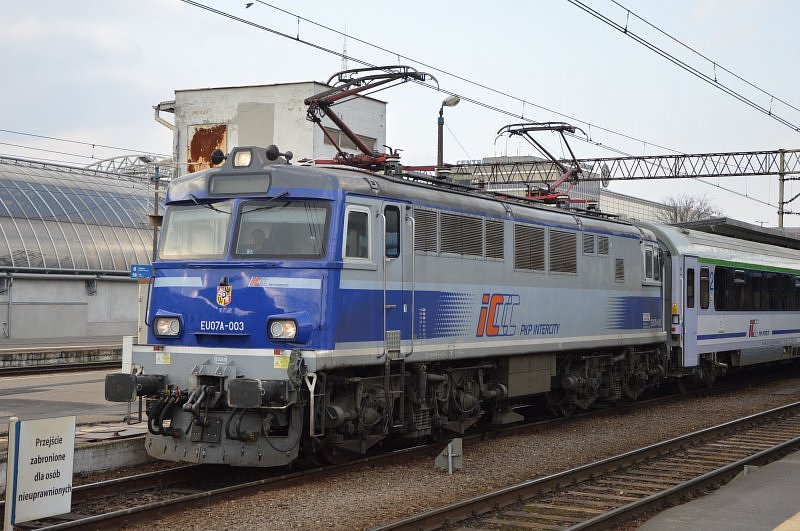
Modernized EU07A series electric locomotive

During the times of the Polish People's Republic, the institute developed a total of 281 railway vehicles, including 27 locomotives and motor cars, 43 passenger, baggage, postal, and heating cars, 205 freight wagons, and 6 trams. Throughout its existence, the institute designed over 400 different types of railway vehicles. It also completed several dozen design and technical projects for the modernization, remotoring, and retrofitting (known as "Polonization") of electric and diesel locomotives as well as diesel multiple units.

==== Selected projects completed by the institute ====
===== Central Design Office and Central Design Office No. 1 (1945–1950) =====
- 1945: Ty45 series steam locomotive.
- 1945–1946: 23W type passenger car.
- 1947: Pt47 series steam locomotive.
- 1947: Pernik 2 steam locomotive for Bulgaria.

===== Central Design Office of the Rolling Stock Industry (1951–1973) =====
- 1950–1951: 1B/2B type electric multiple unit.
- 1951: Ol49 series steam locomotive.
- 1951: Ty51 series steam locomotive.
- 1951: 1E type electric locomotive.
- 1952: Narrow-gauge 1Aw type passenger car.
- 1953: 2E type electric locomotive.
- 1953–1955: 3E type electric locomotive.
- 1954–1955: 1D type diesel locomotive.
- 1956: 43A type passenger car.
- 1956: 3B/4B type electric multiple unit.
- 1959: 5B/6B type electric multiple unit.
- 1959: 4M type diesel railcar (unrealized project).
- 1959: 5M type diesel railcar.
- 1959: 6M/7M type multiple unit (unrealized project).
- 1959: 9M type railbus (unrealized project).
- 1959: 10M/11M type multiple unit (unrealized project).
- 1961–1962: 4E type electric locomotive.
- 1961–1962: 6D type diesel locomotive.
- 1962 (probably): 12M type multiple unit (unrealized project).
- 1962: 104A type passenger car.
- 1964: Four-car electric multiple unit for Yugoslavia.
- 1965–1966: 201E type electric locomotive.
- 1965–1966: 201M type diesel railcar (unrealized project).
- 1965: 301D type diesel locomotive.
- 1966: 301Da type diesel locomotive.
- 1969: 301Db type diesel locomotive.
- 1972: 303D type diesel locomotive.
- 1973: 3WE type electric multiple unit.

===== Research and Development Center for Rail Vehicles (1973–2000) =====
- 1973: 302D type diesel locomotive.
- 1975: 301Dc type diesel locomotive for Lebanon.
- 1976–1977: 203E type electric locomotive.
- 1978: 304D type universal diesel locomotive with 3,000 hp and fully spring-mounted traction motors (unrealized project).
- 1978: 305D type passenger diesel locomotive with 2,250 hp and self-supporting structure (unrealized project).
- 1978–1979: 127A and 127Aa type passenger cars.
- 1979: 201D type freight diesel locomotive with 2,250 hp, a variant of the 303D type diesel locomotive (unrealized project).
- 1979: 202D type freight diesel locomotive with 3,000 hp, a variant of the 302D type diesel locomotive (unrealized project).
- 1980: 203D type freight diesel locomotive with 4,800 hp and 100 km/h speed (unrealized project).
- 1980: 105D type passenger diesel locomotive with 4,800 hp and 160 km/h speed (unrealized project).
- 1980: 306D type diesel locomotive for Syria (unrealized project).
- 1980: 2WE type electric multiple unit (unrealized project).
- 1980–1981: 104E type electric locomotive.
- 1982: 6WE type electric multiple unit.
- 1985: 308D type diesel locomotive for Greece (unrealized project).
- 1988: 405E type electric locomotive.
- Late 1980s: 8WE type electric multiple unit (unrealized project).
- 1985–1989: 9WE type double-decker electric multiple unit (unrealized project).
- Mid-1990s: 12WE type electric multiple unit (unrealized project).
- 1996–1997: Single-cabin 310D type universal diesel locomotive with 1200 kW (unrealized project).

===== Tabor Railway Vehicle Institute (2000–2019) =====
- Turn of the 21st century: Modernization of EN57 series electric multiple units.
- 2004: Modernization of ET22 series electric locomotive to ET22-2000.
- 2009: Modernization of SU45 series diesel locomotive to ST45.
- 2010: Modernization of EU07 series electric locomotive to EU07A.
- Around 2010–2011: 33WE type electric multiple unit.
- 2011: Modernization of SU46 series diesel locomotive to ST46.
- 2014–2017: Modernization of TEM2 type diesel locomotive to 19D type.

===== Łukasiewicz Research Network – Tabor Railway Vehicle Institute (2019–2022) =====
- 2015–2021: 227M type railbus.

== Financial results ==
The Institute generated income from its core activities, which involved conducting scientific research and development work, adapting their results to practical needs, and implementing them in technical sciences.

The unit's research projects were financially supported by the State Committee for Scientific Research and the National Centre for Research and Development. The funding covered projects carried out in collaboration with companies such as Fablok, Pesa Mińsk Mazowiecki, Pesa Bydgoszcz, HCP-FPS, and ZNTK Oleśnica.

== Employment ==
At the beginning of the bureau's operations, the increasing complexity of its tasks led to the expansion of its engineering staff. In September 1965, on the 20th anniversary of its establishment, the bureau employed 372 people, including 141 engineers, 38 technicians, 11 economists, and 8 specialists from other fields. A total of 185 employees were directly involved in design work.

The number of employees continued to grow until the mid-1970s. In the first half of the 1980s, employment declined due to a reduction in orders from the domestic industry. The workforce stabilized at the beginning of the 21st century. As of 31 December 2019, the institute employed 317 people, 28 of whom were research staff.

== Directors ==
From	To	Person	Name of the institute	Source
1945	1947	Gustaw Bryling	Central Design Office	
1947	1948	Eugeniusz Szklarzyk	Central Design Office	
1949	1949	Eugeniusz Szklarzyk	Central Design Office No. 1	
1949	1950	Franciszek Tatara	Central Design Office No. 1	
1951	1952	Franciszek Tatara	Central Design Office of the Rolling Stock Industry	
1952	1957	Bogdan Nowacki	Central Design Office of the Rolling Stock Industry	
1957	1958	Stanisław Kowalczyk	Central Design Office of the Rolling Stock Industry	
1958	1971	Jan Drabik	Central Design Office of the Rolling Stock Industry	
1972	1973	Alfred Baron	Central Design Office of the Rolling Stock Industry	
1973	1979	Alfred Baron	Research and Development Center for Rail Vehicles	
1979	1986	Jerzy Żałopa	Research and Development Center for Rail Vehicles	
1986	1996	Ryszard Szerbart	Research and Development Center for Rail Vehicles	
1996	2000	Włodzimierz Stawecki	Research and Development Center for Rail Vehicles	
2000	2017	Włodzimierz Stawecki	Tabor Railway Vehicle Institute	
2017	2018	Jarosław Czerwiński (acting)	Tabor Railway Vehicle Institute	
2018	2019	Maciej Andrzejewski	Tabor Railway Vehicle Institute	
2019	2021	Maciej Andrzejewski	Łukasiewicz Research Network – Tabor Railway Vehicle Institute	
2021	2022	Arkadiusz Kawa (acting)	Łukasiewicz Research Network – Tabor Railway Vehicle Institute	

== Bibliography ==
- Kroma, Robert; Sosiński, Janusz; Zintel, Krzysztof (2012). Normalnotorowe wagony silnikowe PKP 1945–1990 [Standard-Gauge Motor Cars of the Polish State Railways 1945–1990] (in Polish). Poznań: BWH Kolpress. ISBN 978-83-933257-3-3.
- Ćwikła, Marek; Terczyński, Paweł (2004). Lokomotywy spalinowe produkcji HCP serii: SP45, SU46, SP47 [Diesel Locomotives Produced by HCP, Series: SP45, SU46, SP47] (in Polish). Poznań: Kolpress.
