= Kościerzyna Railway Museum =

Polish railway museum in Kościerzyna

Coordinates: 54°7′10″N 17°59′50″E

- Muzeum Kolejnictwa w Kościerzynie
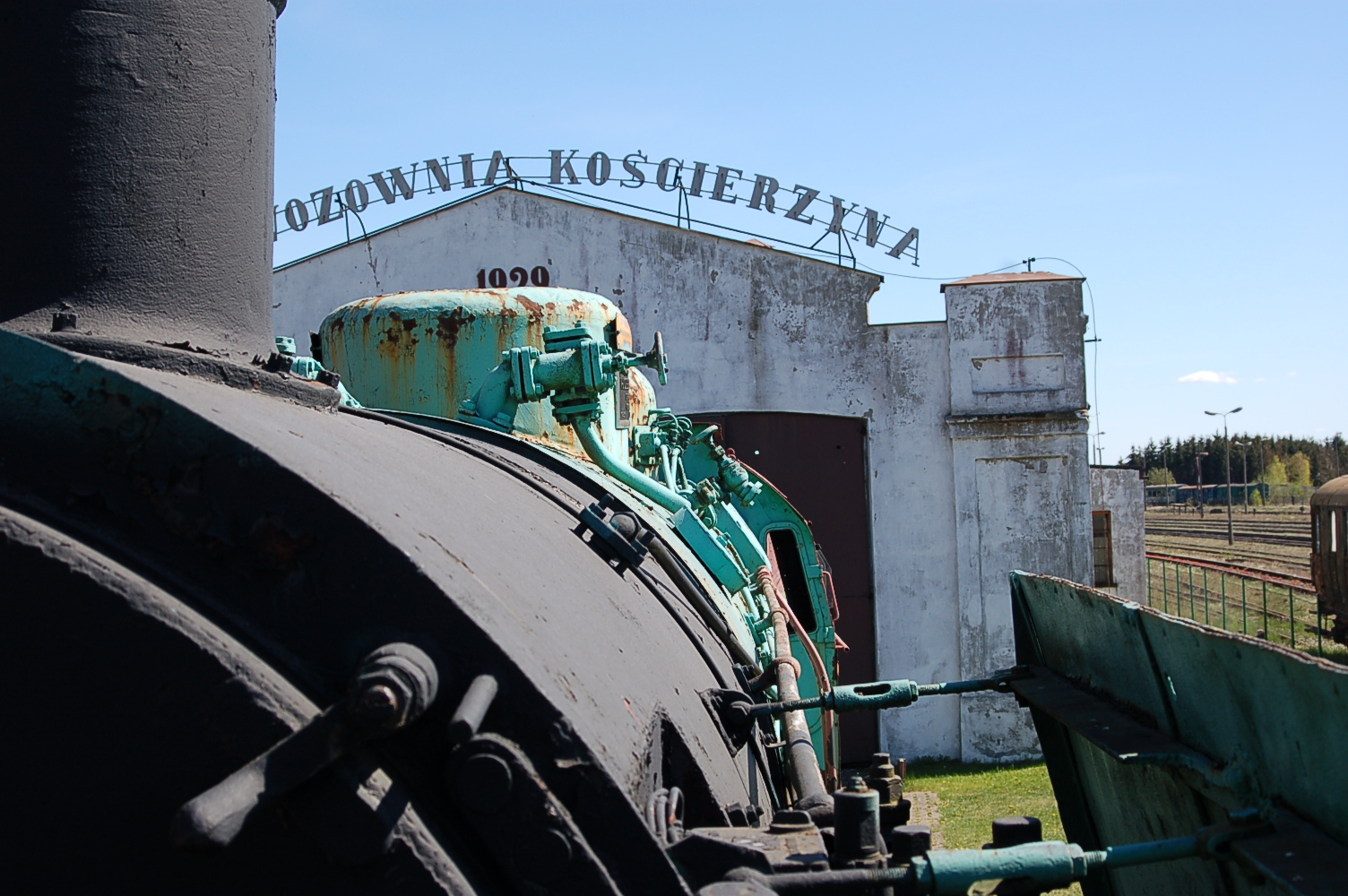
- Former name: Skansen Parowozownia Kościerzyna
- Established: 1 November 1992
- Location: Kościerzyna
- Type: Heritage railway
- Founder: PKP
- Owner: Muzeum Ziemi Kościerskiej w Kościerzynie
- Public transit access: Kościerzyna railway station
- Website: muzeumkolejnictwa.com.pl

The Kościerzyna Railway Museum (Polish: Muzeum Kolejnictwa w Kościerzynie) is a Polish railway museum located in Kościerzyna, Pomeranian Voivodeship. The museum is located in place of a now defunct locomotive depot near Kościerzyna railway station.

The exhibits consists mostly of steam locomotives, but several diesel and electric locomotives, as well as electric multiple units and diesel multiple units are also available for visitors.

Besides rolling stock displayed in the open air, inside the shed visitors can also see several exhibitions of machines and devices connected with Polish railway history.

== History ==
The approximate year of opening of the locomotive depot in Kościerzyna was 1885, when the railway reached this town. The depot had been rebuilt several times before it was definitely closed on April 1, 1991. The museum was opened on November 1, 1992, at the decision of the director of the Rolling Stock Repair Works in Gdynia.

== Visitor information ==
Railway Museum Kościerzyna is located near the railway station, on the opposite side of the track. It is possible to get into most steam locomotives, but many other vehicles are closed and available to look at only from the outside.

== The exhibit ==
The museum owns many interesting and important for Polish railway history vehicles, including:

=== Steam locomotives ===
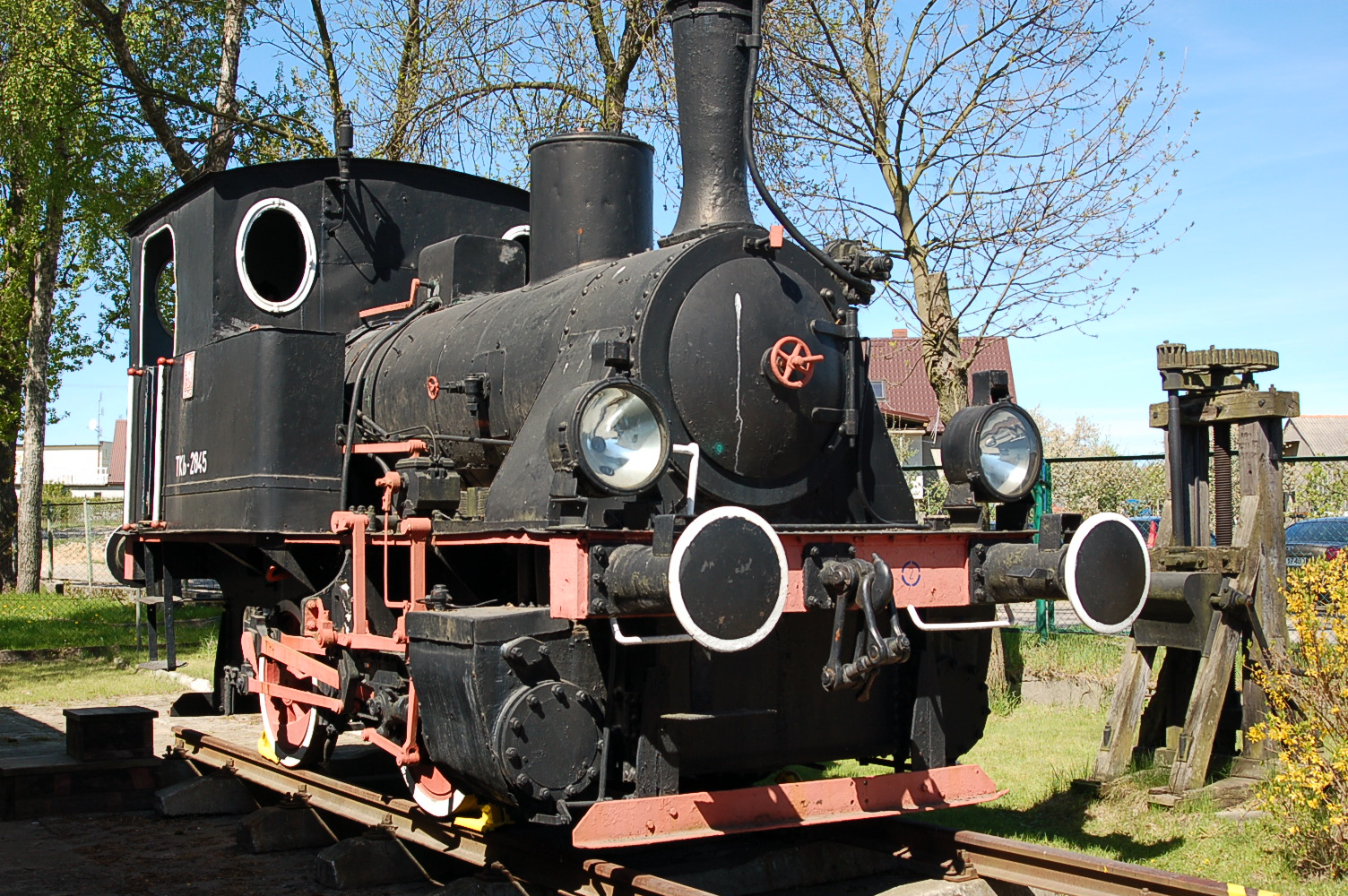
TKb-2845

- TKb - small 0-4-0T tank locomotive of German production (built in 1925).
- TE 7175 - German 1943 production locomotive serving until 1985 in Kaliningrad Oblast.
- TKh100-45 - German 1938 production tank locomotive.
- TKh 3140 - 0-6-0T Freight tank engine produced in Fablok, Chrzanów.
- TKp100-04 - 0-8-0T shunting engine of German design from 1927.
- TKt48 - 2-8-2T freight and local passenger tank engine produced in Fablok, Chrzanów.
- Tw1-90 - 0-10-0 Heavy freight locomotive (German production) from 1918.
- Ty2 - German 1943 production 2-10-0 freight locomotive.
- Ty42 - Polish version of Ty2 2-10-0 freight locomotive.
- Ty45-139 - Polish 2-10-0 post-war heavy freight locomotive.
- Pt47 - Polish 2-8-2 post-war passenger locomotive.
- Ok1-112 - German 4-6-0 passenger locomotive from 1915

=== Diesel and electric locomotives ===
- Ls40-5438 - Small diesel shunter.
- SP30-006 - Passenger version of SM30 shunter.
- SM41-43 - Hungarian shunting locomotive produced in Ganz Mavag.
- SP45-139 - Polish passenger diesel locomotive.
- SP47-001 - A prototype of Polish passenger diesel locomotive.
- ET21-367 - Polish freight electric locomotive.
- SM03-136 - Small diesel shunter.

=== Diesel and electric multiple units ===
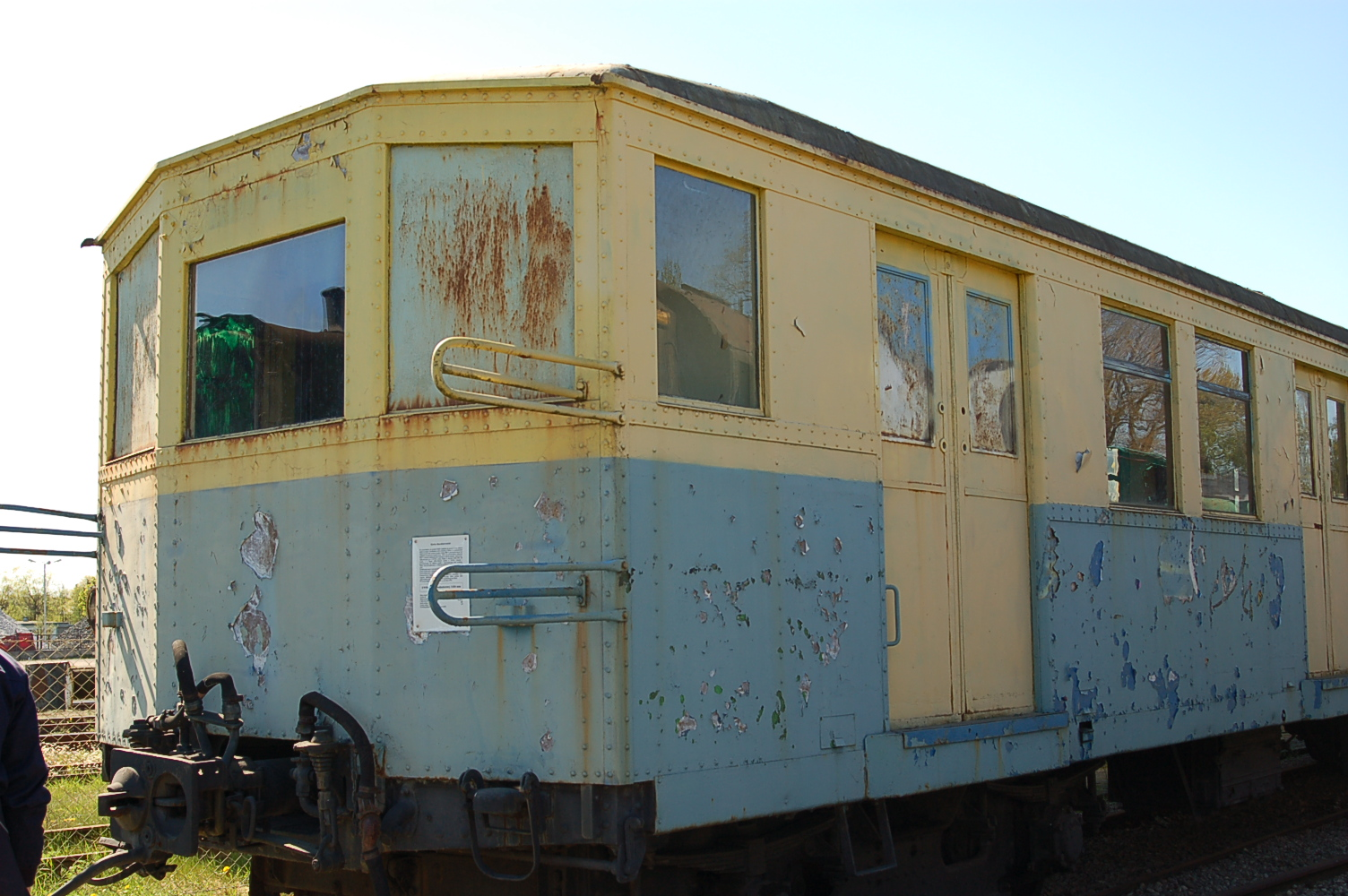
EW90 EMU in the museum

- SR61 - A modification of SN61 DMU.
- EW90-12 - EMU of pre-war German construction.

=== Other exhibits ===
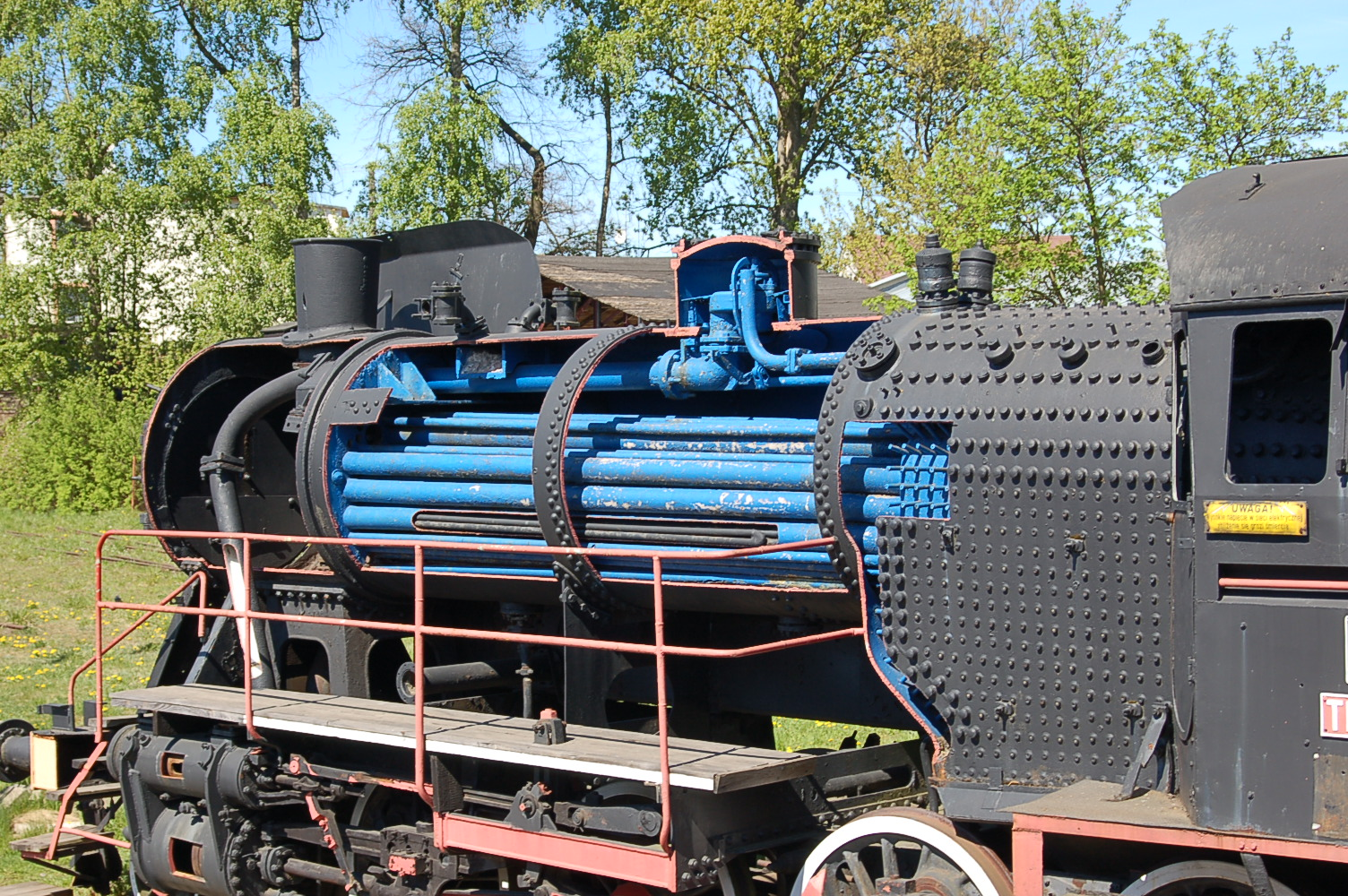
TKt48 locomotive

The museum exhibits also several carriages, wagons and tankers as well as technical cars. The museum decided to prepare special, educational locomotive to show visitors how steam engines operated. For this purpose the TKt48-179 locomotive was cut in order to show the interior of the engine's devices.
