= PKP class SU45 =

Polish diesel locomotive class

SU45
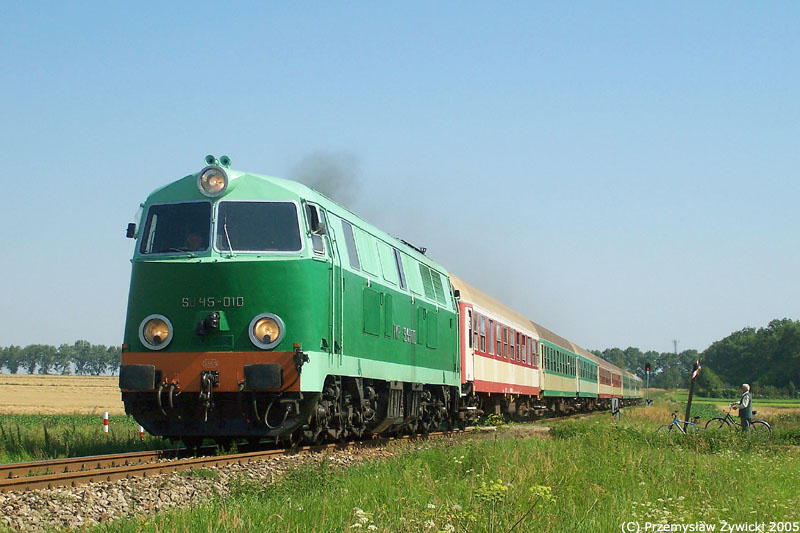
- SU45-010 with an intercity train "Solina"
Type and origin
- Power type: Diesel-electric
- Builder: ZNTK Poznań
- Model: 301Db
- Build date: 1988-1997
- Total produced: 191
Specifications
- Configuration
  - AAR: C-C
  - UIC: Co′Co′
- Gauge: 1,435 mm (4 ft 8 1/2 in) standard gauge
- Driver dia.: 1,100 mm (43.31 in)
- Wheel diameter: 1,100 mm (43.31 in)
- Wheelbase: 3,900 mm (153.54 in)
- Length: 18,990 mm (62 ft 3 5/8 in)
- Width: 3,900 mm (12 ft 9 1/2 in)
- Height: 4,288 mm (14 ft 7/8 in)
- Axle load: 17 t (17 long tons; 19 short tons)
- Loco weight: 102 t (100 long tons; 112 short tons)
- Fuel type: Diesel Fuel
- Fuel capacity: 3,500 L (770 imp gal; 920 US gal)
- Fuel consumption: Max. 300 L per 100 km (66 imp gal, 79 US gal per 62 miles)
- Prime mover: 2112SSF
- RPM
  - Maximum RPM: 1500 rpm
- Engine type: Four-stroke 12-cylinder diesel Engine
- Aspiration: Turbocharger
- Displacement: 95.5 L
- Generator: GP-8461B1
- Traction motors: LSa-430
- Cylinders: 12
- Cylinder size: 210 mm (8.27 in) (x ?)
- Transmission: Electric 700 V
- Gear ratio: 19:64
- MU working: Yes
- Train heating: Electric 3 kV LCPb-400 generator
- Loco brake: Oerlikon
- Train brakes: Air
- Safety systems: SHP
- Couplers: Screw coupler
Performance figures
- Maximum speed: 120 km/h (75 mph)
- Power output: 1,750 hp (1,300 kW)
- Tractive effort: 320 kN (72,000 lb_{f})
Career
- Operators: PKP
- Numbers: 001–265
- Nicknames: Fiat
- Retired: 1999–2016
- Preserved: 4
- Disposition: 3 in service, 1 out of order, remainder scrapped

SU45 (prototype 301D, current type 301Db) is a Polish class of main mixed traffic diesel electric locomotives converted from SP45 for operating passenger and freight trains in Poland. Built from 1970 to 1976 by H. Cegielski in Poznań as the passenger version classified SP45, they were later converted to mixed traffic by ZNTK Poznań.

SU45 locomotives were one of the most popular locomotive series throughout Poland associated with Polish national railway.

== Origins ==
=== Before the prototype ===
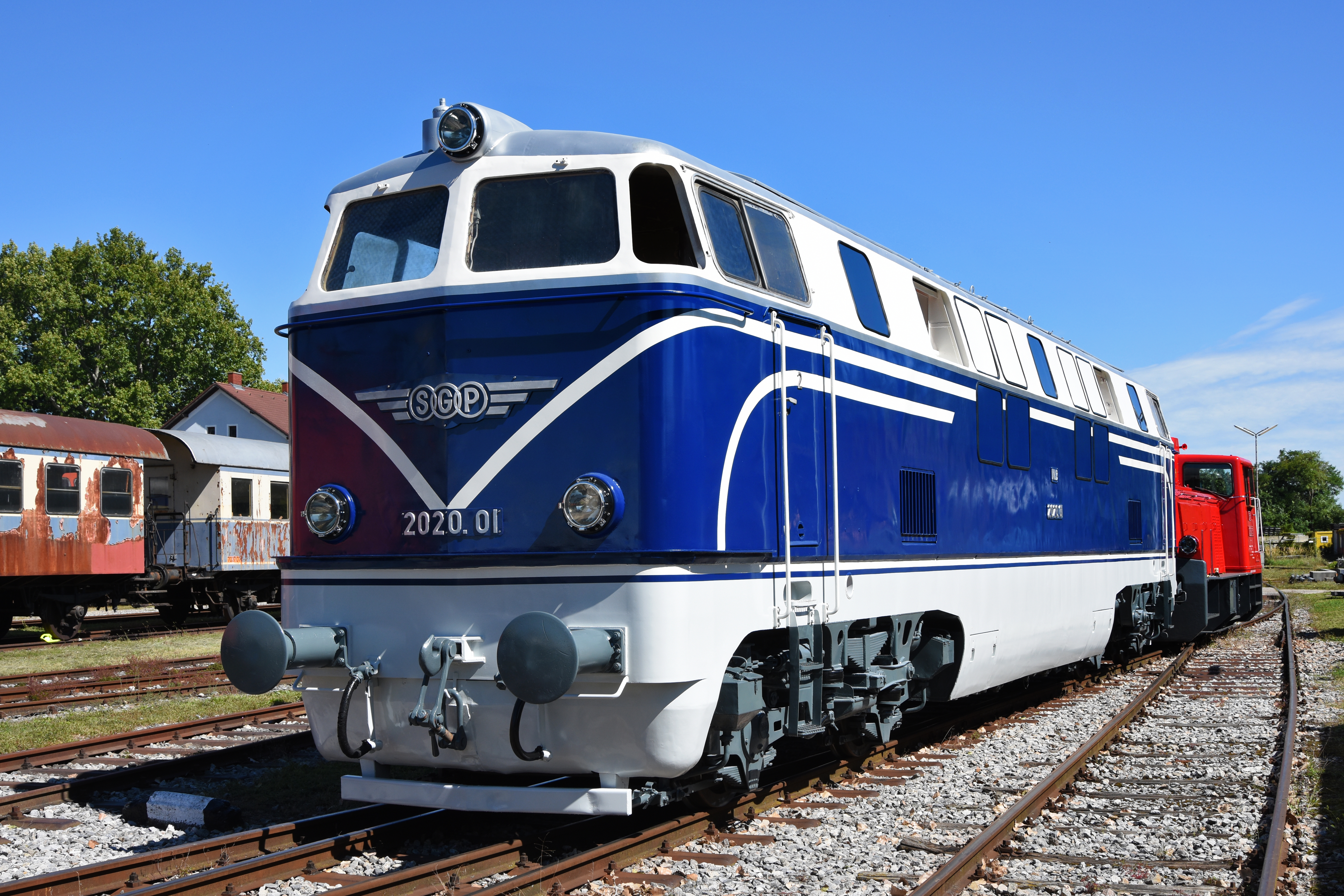
ÖBB Class 2020.01 prototype that was tested in Poland for PKP dieselisation, now preserved in Austria

Steam locomotive orders were declining in 1957 for the Polish railway dieselisation, in which development of new diesel locomotives were necessary, but not for the mainline locomotives. In 1961 the Austrian diesel hydraulic locomotive prototype ÖBB Class 2020.01 was tested by PKP, the tests were successful, but it was not ordered by PKP. It was then decided to develop a new mainline locomotive to run on non-electrified railway lines, which was then started by Central Construction Bureau of Railway Stock Industry (CBKPTK) in 1963.

=== Prototype ===
In 1965 H. Cegielski – Poznań, despite having no experience with heavy diesel locomotives, came in to develop a locomotive intended for mixed traffic operations. The 12C22W prime mover was designed by Central Design Bureau for Internal Combustion Engines (CBKSS) intended to develop 1700 HP at 1100 rpm, but as built by Cegielski it was reduced to 1520 HP at 1020 rpm. The locomotive itself initially designated SU44 was designed by CBKPTK in Poznań, but due to the delays of the development problems the SU45 locomotive design was made.

The first prototype was built in 1967 by Cegielski, it was fitted with a Vapor steam boiler intended for train heating, streamlined headlights, electric components made by Dolmel, bogies made by Fablok and the engine made by the same company. The tests began in August and operational testing began in October on the Poznań - Gdynia route.

The results of the tests were unsatisfactory, some problems occurred with the design, especially the engine; it was proven to be unreliable for the operation. The design was not purchased by PKP, the prototype was then scrapped in the mid-1970s and later the decision was taken to construct a second prototype with an engine under a license from Fiat; this was intended only for passenger service and classified SP45.

=== SP45 conversion ===
Due to the multiple problems with the Vapor steam boiler, such as the spares needed to be imported from the United States (which was deemed to be too expensive), the increase of electrically heated passenger wagons, the troubles with switching the trains into different traction, and having to choose between achieving scheduled speeds or to heat up the train (especially on the inclines during winter), it was decided to modify SP45 locomotives to electric heating.

The locomotives were sent to be rebuilt at ZNTK Poznań in 1988, they were equipped with 3 kV DC Dolmel LCPb-400 electric train heating and its multiple control sockets were placed on both ends for freight traffic, meaning they were converted for mixed traffic service. Although due to the next railway electrification, locomotives were moved to low category railway lines. The first locomotive rebuilt was SP45-074 and the last was SP45-061, the conversion took 9 years from 1988 to 1997 converting only 191 locomotives, the remainder that did not get converted were still in service until the end of the 20th century.

== Design ==
The SU45 is a diesel electric mixed traffic mainline locomotive with Co'Co' Six-axle bogies, 2112SSF internal combustion engine powered by diesel, electric 3 kV train heating and multiple control system. The welded mainstay with a locomotive body is a self-supporting structure, both locomotive cabs are placed on both directed compartments allowing a better driver's view. In the middle of the locomotive, a 12-cylinder, four-stroke, diesel internal combustion engine 2112SSF built by Fiat under license is located, along with a top-up with the GP-846B1 main generator built by Dolmel in Wrocław under license from Alstom, in which is also used as a starter. On both compartments between the engine and the driver's cab, a cooling unit and a 3 kV DC electric train heating system LCPb-400 are located. Six LSa-430 traction motors are mounted on each axle of the locomotive's bogies, the engines are suspended by the tram system ("by the nose"). Between the locomotive's bogies, there is a battery, water tank and most importantly a 3500 Liter fuel tank, the transfer of the pulling force and the braking system from the bogies to the body is carried out by an angle ever. Its engine oil consumption is 36L per hour, and its diesel fuel consumption is 223 g/kWh (164 g/hph), which at rated power under normal conditions gives 279 kg/h (1700 hp). Due to the large amount of power consumed from the engine by the heating system in winter during long uphill climbs, the locomotive does not have enough power to maintain the scheduled speed and to heat up the train.

== Service ==
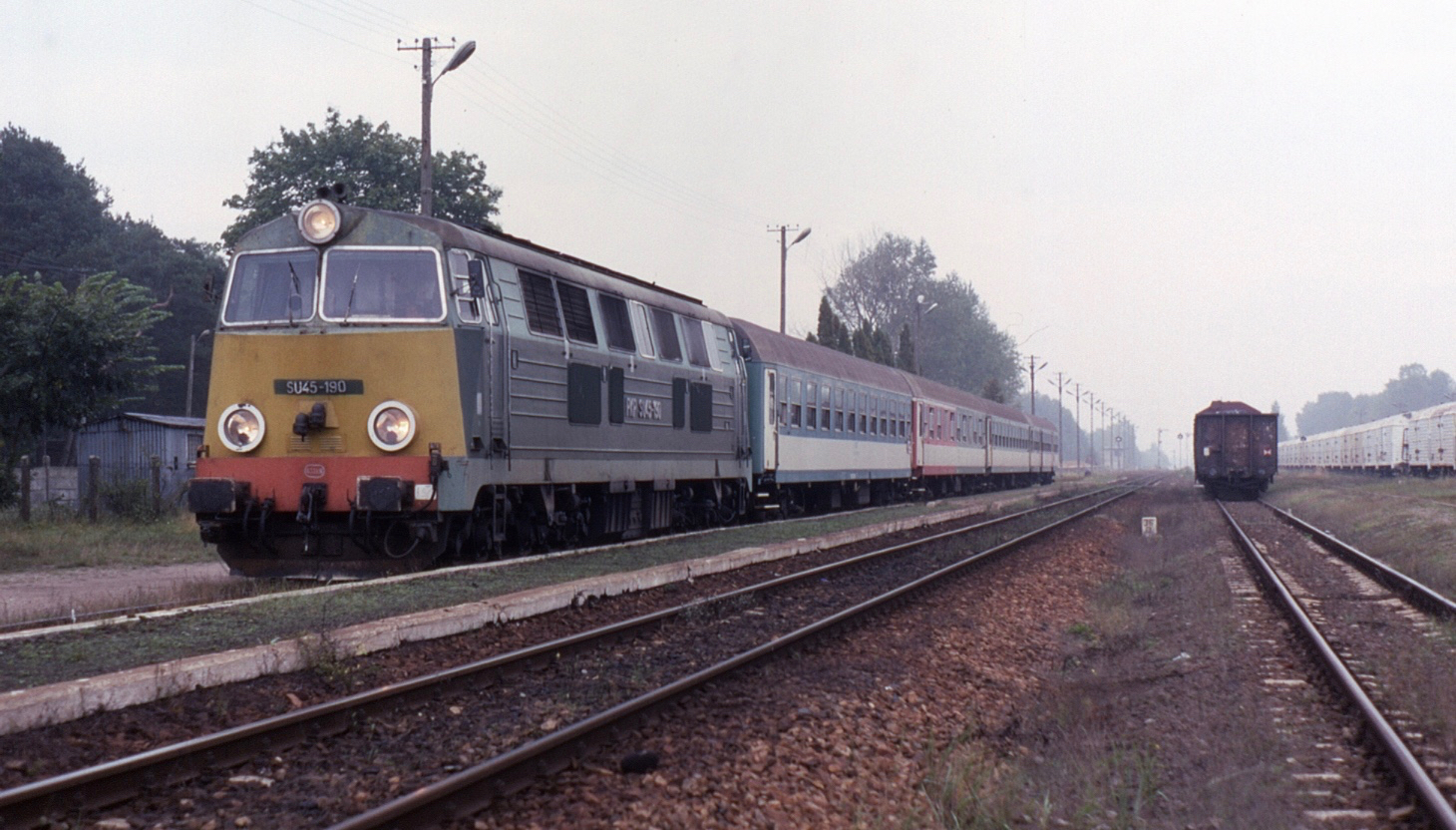
SU45-190 in Czerwony Bór (1995)

SU45 locomotives were assigned to operate local trains, express trains and sometimes freight trains on non electrified railway lines around Poland. They were mostly used in the northwestern, northern and eastern macroregions of Poland including Greater Poland Voivodeship, Lubusz Voivodeship, West Pomeranian, Kuyavian-Pomeranian and Pomeranian Voivodeships, Warmian-Masurian Voivodeship, Podlaskie Voivodeship and Lublin Voivodeship, these were the common SU45 locomotive distribution areas.

The common type of traffic used by these locomotives was passenger traffic, most likely local and express trains. The locomotives pulled local trains on distributed areas around voivodeships and between its borders linking the towns from different regions or in the same region, also outside Poland's western borders where they pulled local trains to Germany, including Frankfurt (Oder), some of the trains they pulled consisted of BHP wagons, Ryflak wagons and/or 120A type wagons. Additionally they pulled interregional trains including the Wrocław - Dresden train.

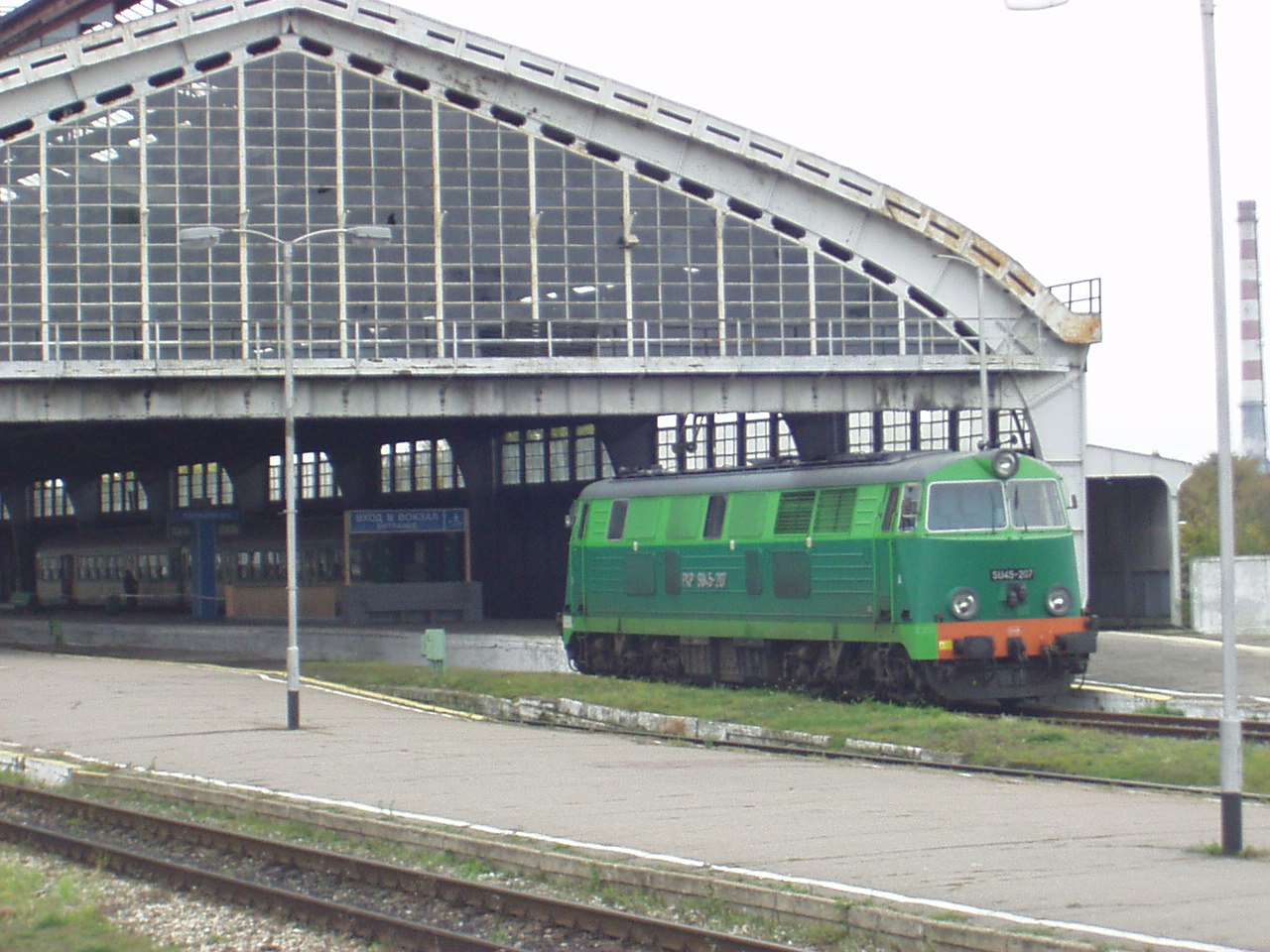
SU45 in Kaliningrad (2003)

They also pulled express trains around Poland on long distances between the cities on non electrified routes, although the southern part of Poland was not mostly distributed by SU45 locomotives some of them operated there with express trains such as "Śnieżka" or "Wetlina", in some cases they did not pull the express trains from the start all the way to its final destination, the trains might be pulled by electric locomotives in which they stop at some stations with the maximum overhead catenary range in order for them to couple up with the train and continue the scheduled route along the non electrified railway lines (it was common on the Hel Peninsula, SU45 locomotives operated there as well), up north between the Polish and the Russian border they operated express trains from Gdynia to Kaliningrad, until 2004 when they were replaced by M62 locomotives going all the way to Kaliningrad in which they only stopped at the border station of Mamonovo, the rest of the route being operated by a Russian locomotive.

They sometimes pulled freight along non electrified branchlines on short distances around distributed areas of its locomotive series, they would carry wood, coal, goods or even freight outside the borders including Russia, or sometimes carry mixed freight.

SU45 locomotives were allocated at the same railway depots before they were converted to mixed traffic including some junction station depots located in small settlements, they were later assigned to larger depots with more stationing areas due to the fleet change or sometimes the depot closure, in fact Łódż had only 2 locomotives because most of its railways around were mostly electrified, and Białystok had 35 locomotives in which the railways around were not electrified, and the SU45 freight traffic was common here.

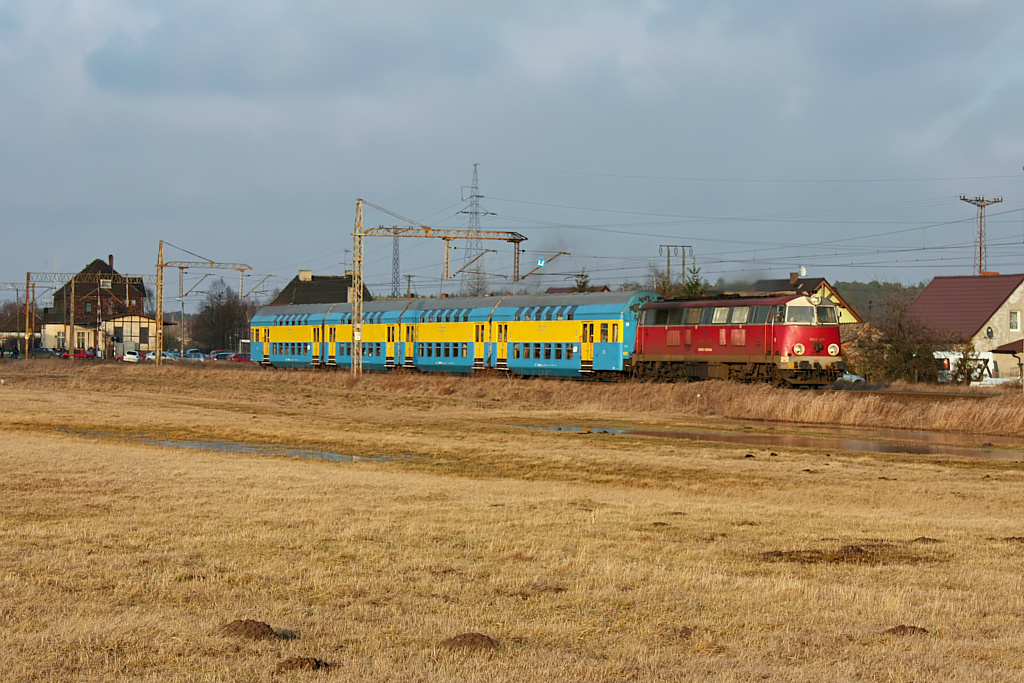
SU45-079 with a regional train R 77744 (2012)

In 2001 all of the existing the locomotives came in part of PKP Cargo after the PKP restructurisation, in which switching to freight traffic did not affect, also after the restructurisation they pulled express trains under the new types such as Intercity or TLK (Twoje Linie Kolejowe). They all were part of PKP Cargo ownership until 2008 when some of the locomotives came in part of PKP's railway companies; PKP Intercity and Polregio, the other numbered from 198 to 265 remained in PKP Cargo and yet they hauled freight trains more frequently along with Passenger traffic sometimes, its railway depots also came in part of PKP Cargo. As of 2009, PKP had 120 locomotives (50 from PKP Cargo, 51 from Prewozy Regionalne and 19 from PKP Intercity).

Locomotives operating regional trains were starting to get replaced by Railbuses in which they were much cheaper to maintain, most of the locomotives stopped operating in Pomeranian Voivodeship, West Pomeranian Voivodeship, Warmian-Masurian Voivodeship, Podlaskie Voivodeship and Lublin Voivodeship, the remaining locomotives in part of PKP Cargo and PKP Intercity were still in service. while some of the locomotives were getting retired from service not all were replaced in Greater Poland voivodeship as they pulled regional trains around this region, some of the remaining locomotives were assigned to pull special trains on chosen railways such as SU45-079, 089, 115, 164.

Two locomotives (141 and 165) were bought by Unikol Railway Workshop in Kostrzyn in 2011, SU45-141 was refurbished and reclassified to 301Db-141 in 2013 (later changing its fleet number to 143), it was assigned to gather empty wagons mostly tanker wagons to the workshop for the inspection and/or repairs and operate shunting duties on railway yards. The remaining locomotives were retired from Intercity service in 2015 and retired from regional service in 2016, 9 retired locomotives were bought by Karpiel for refurbishment most likely, and the last locomotives (079, 089 and 115) were retired from regular passenger service. Later on SU45-115 was bought by SKPL Cargo in which was refurbished and tested on Ostrów Wielkopolski - Kalisz route and back, after the test run it went out of service due to an engine malfunction and was placed next to other SKPL owned fleet in Ostrów Wielkopolski. SU45-192 was bought by Karpiel along with other locomotives, as the refurbishment for these locomotives was intended only one was a successful example (192) in which was refurbished in 2017 (also changing fleet number to 194) and was then assigned to operate only shunting duties on the Brzesko Terminal in Brzesko in 2018 due to the withdrawal of the transport licence by the office of railway transport. Meanwhie two locomotives (079 and 089) were sold to KSK Wrocław for intended preservation for charter service around Lower Silesia and Opole Voivodeship, the refurbishment was intended for both locomotives in which only one locomotive (079) was a successful example, the second (089) is still awaiting for the refurbishment at KSK Wrocław.

=== Summary ===
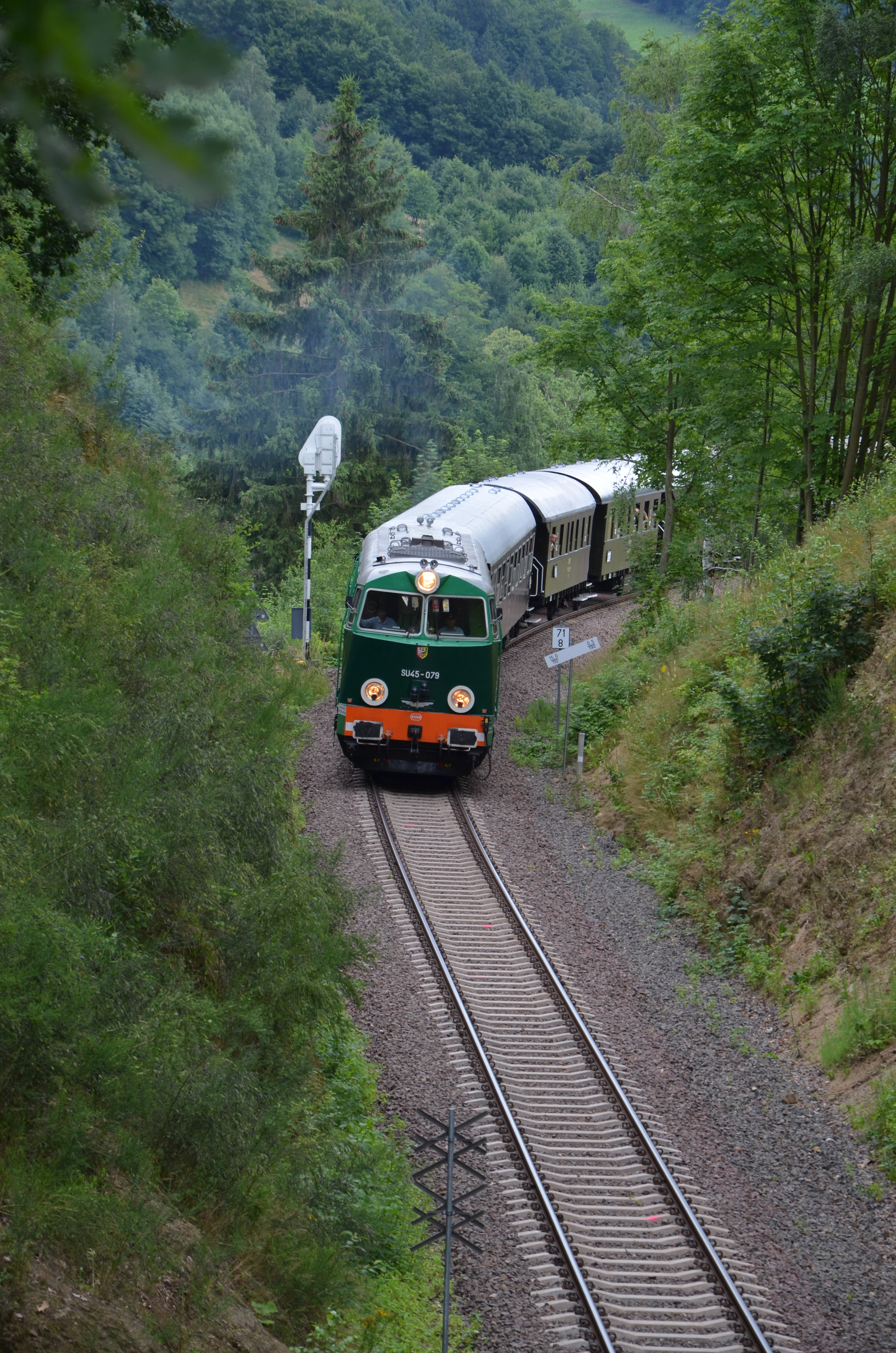
SU45-079 with a charter train (2023)

SU45-165 did not get any refurbishments instead some of its parts were removed and was put up for sale on OLX at a price of 42500 PLN in 2025. SU45-194 entered freight service in 2019 assigned to pull mostly container freight trains around Southern Poland and operate charter trains as well. Preserved example SU45-079 entered charter service in 2021 and also took part in locomotive parades in Nysa. As of 2026 only three of the locomotives are in service and one out of service, 301Db-143, SU45-079 and SU45-194 remain in service today while SU45-089 and SU45-115 remain awaiting for repair today.

Distribution of locomotives, December 1997
PKP class SU45 (Poland)
Code	Name	Quantity
GYA	Gdynia	8
CJE	Chojnice	21
LBN	Lublin	20
WCW	Wrocław	10
BYK	Białystok	35
TRŃ	Toruń	14
BOZ	Bydgoszcz	11
OZN	Olsztyn	6
PZŃ	Poznań	28
CWK	Czerwieńsk	10
SZN	Szczecin	9
BOD	Białogard	16
ŁDŹ	Łódź	2
Withdrawn (1997)		1
Total rebuilt:		191

== Withdrawal and scrapping ==
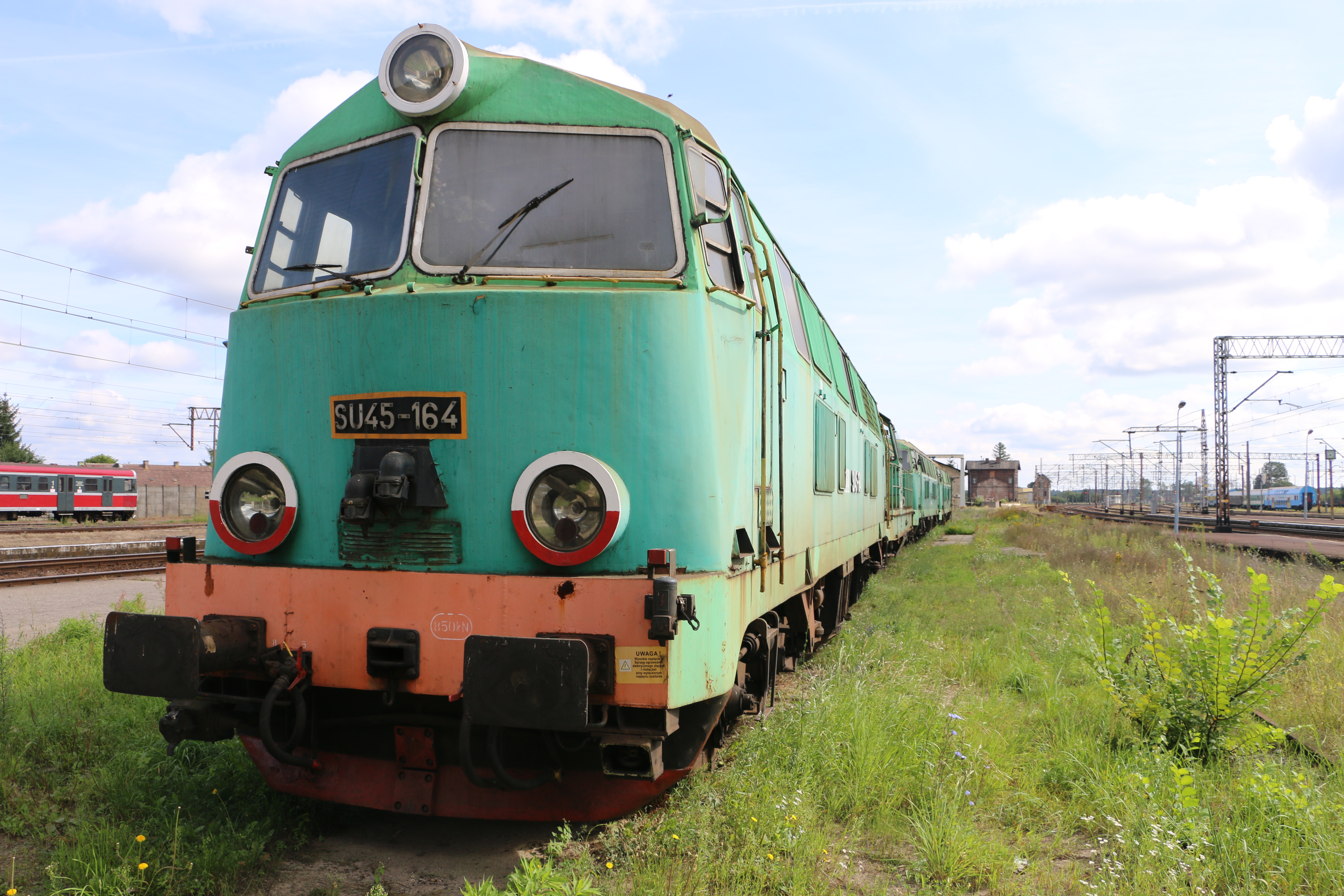
SU45-164 abandoned along with other locomotives

Some SU45 locomotives not long after conversion were withdrawn from service due to the repair costs, engine failures and high fuel consumption, their first withdrawal started in late 1998 and scrapping of locomotives occurred between 1999 and 2006, numbering 34 of total locomotives.

The next SU45 withdrawal occurred between 2009 and 2011 due to more technical problems from the locomotive series and the introduction of the new railbuses built by Newag and Pesa in which were cheaper to maintain, had lower fuel consumption and more seats, one of the locomotive's operations were taken by the new fleet, meaning railbuses replaced SU45 locomotives, the scrapping occurred between 2009 and 2013 at Lębork, Czeremcha, Gdynia, Lublin, Leszno, Szczecin, Bydgoszcz, Warsaw and other locations, scrapping almost 100 locomotives.

Next withdrawal occurred between 2014 and 2018 due to the introduction of new locomotives such as SM42 Rebuilds (18D, 6Dl) and SU160 for PKP Intercity; modernised ST44 and SM48 (ST48) locomotives for PKP Cargo; the leasing of Czechoslovak 754 locomotives; and more technical problems. Nine locomotives were scrapped in Września, Bydgoszcz and Lublin.

Even though not all locomotives were scrapped after the withdrawals, some of them were left abandoned, mostly between 2009 and 2016; one of the locomotives was put up for sale via electronic bidding. The last locomotive scrappings occurred between 2020 and 2025 when abandoned locomotives were bought by metals recycling companies including Olmet and Segromet; most of the abandoned locomotives were owned by Polregio and PKP Cargo. Karpiel bought nine locomotives (073, 100, 118, 152, 175, 183, 192, 195 and 214) for a refurbishment, but only one was completed (192), the others were in poor condition and seven were scrapped at Brzesko Terminal, leaving only one locomotive (100) remaining there. A total of 25 locomotives were scrapped in the years 2020–25.

== Preserved locomotives ==
Five locomotives are preserved in three locations, Chojnice, Małaszewice and Wrocław. These include in display, SU45-052, SU45-089, SU45-213, the undergoing restoration SU45-228, and the operational SU45-079 as the last locomotive to ever retire from regular service.

=== SU45-052 ===
This locomotive pulled local trains around Lower Silesia and Opole Voivodeship until its retirement in 2008, it stayed retired in Kamieniec Ząbkowicki then moved to Wrocław Brochów depot owned by PKP Cargo in Wrocław. After being placed under the depot for a long time it was withdrawn in 2025 and moved to a depot owned by PKP Intercity and KSK Wrocław pulled by SP42-001 locomotive, in which was listed as exhibit part of KSK Wrocław and was preserved in the same year along with other locomotives.

=== SU45-079 ===
After its retirement of pulling regional trains around Greater Poland and outside its borders in late 2016, it was displaced in Krzyż along with a Bmnopux wagon at the railway depot. It was withdrawn in 2018 and was bought by ALS S.C. Stary Sącz for KSK Wrocław, which was moved to Ostrów Wielkopolski for a renovation to become a preserved example in working order, after it was sold it obtained a power generator from SU45-241. Its renovation was completed in 2021 but did not obtain a certificate of working order, It participated in Nysa locomotive parade but in inoperable state the same year. SU45-079 obtained a certificate in 2022 and started operating charter trains as a preserved example, it also participated in another locomotive parade in Nysa and pulled a special train to a test track center near Żmigród, the locomotive participated in multiple railway exhibitions including on the occasion of 80 years of Pafawag. SU45-079 remains as a preserved example in working order today.

=== SU45-089 ===
After its retirement of pulling regional trains around Greater Poland and outside its borders in 2016, it was displaced in Krzyż along with other locomotives including SU45-079 (in which its engine was moved to this locomotive). It was bought by ALS S.C. Stary Sącz for possible renovation, SU45-089 was moved to Ostrów Wielkopolski but did not get any renovations, it was later moved to Wrocław (especially KSK Wrocław) and it remained as a retired exhibit along other locomotives. The locomotive still awaits for renovation at its disposition as it remains untouched today.

=== SU45-213 ===
This locomotive operated intercity trains and freight trains around Poland under PKP Cargo's ownership. In January 2015 during the departure from the Rzeszów Główny railway station with a "San" TLK train numbered 35108 from Przemyśl to Bydgoszcz, the locomotive malfunctioned, in which SU46-031 had to come over from Stalowa Wola to take its train, it remained out of order after it malfunctioned. In 2016 along with other locomotives of its series initially getting retired, SU45-213 was also retired from service and was intended to be preserved for museum purposes under protection. The locomotive was then moved to Warszawa Odolany Depot in Warsaw in 2017 as it remains as an exhibit part of PKP Cargo, due to the depot's closure in January 2025 SU45-213 along with other locomotives were moved to Małaszewice near Terespol. SU45-213 remains as PKP Cargo's exhibit today, in which its service came to an end after a malfunction.

=== SU45-228 ===
Another locomotive with a similar story to SU45-213. In February 2014 while pulling the "San" TLK train, it malfunctioned near Kraśnik in which SM42-1052 was sent to pull its train (it was 270 minutes late). The locomotive was then retired after a malfunction, although in 2016 all of the remaining locomotives of its series came to retire, SU45-228 was intended to be preserved for museum purposes under protection. Locomotive was bought back from PKP Cargo by SMK Chojnice In 2023 and was moved from Nowy Sącz to Chojnice, it was sent to be restored to become a preserved example in working order for operating Charter trains (same as SU45-079). In May 2026 it was presented at the Chojnice railway station after two years of renovation, the locomotive received historical livery, rebuilt cab, light installation (including the headlights) and some engine repairs were made, it was sent to Gdańsk for further repairs. The locomotive remains still in renovation in Gdańsk as of today, as the progress of restoring it is almost done.

Factory type	Fleet type	Image	Owner	Location	Livery	Notes
301Db-052	SU45-052		KSK Wrocław	PKP Intercity Depot in Wrocław	1990s PKP green with yellow fronts	Preserved
301Db-079	SU45-079		KSK Wrocław	PKP Intercity Depot in Wrocław	PKP Green	Operational
301Db-089	SU45-089		KSK Wrocław	PKP Intercity Depot in Wrocław	PKP Green	Awaiting restoration
301Db-213	SU45-213		PKP Cargo	Małaszewice Depot	PKP Green	Preserved
301Db-228	SU45-228	—	SMK Chojnice	Gdańsk	1990s PKP green with yellow fronts	Undergoing restoration

== Accidents and incidents ==
- On 19 February 1992, SU45-005 caught on fire in Czernikowo, in which the locomotive was sent to be repaired.
- In 1998, SU45-097 collided with a truck on a railway crossing in Luboń, the driver of the locomotive possibly died. After the accident the cabin from the SU45-047 had to be installed due to the damage.
- On 8 May 1999, SU45-157 with an express train numbered 26220 from Hrubieszów to Wrocław derailed on the Zwierzyniec - Biłgoraj line in Hedwiżyn, three people were injured. The cause of derailment was the damage of a railway switch.
- On 25 May 2000, SU45-175 collided with a truck hauling sand on a railway crossing in Granowo Nowotomyskie. Both drivers died, cab from the SU45-040 had to be installed due to the damage.
- On 22 August 2004, SU45-057 caught on fire due to electrical malfunction near the Chojnice station while operating a local train from Tczew to Chojnice. Passengers quickly escaped the train, once the firefighters arrived the locomotive was uncoupled from the train, nine firefighters extinguished the locomotive, no one was hurt in the incident.
- On 11 December 2007, SU45-018 with an intercity train from Suwałki to Łódź collided with a car on the railway crossing around Dąbrowa.
- On 13 October 2010, SU45-214 with an intercity train from Białystok to Szczecin around Ełk, locomotive caught on fire due to electrical malfunction.
- On 21 July 2012, SU45-220 with a "Hetman" TLK train in Tarnowska Wola at around 8:00 am, hit a broken tree hanging above the railway. Driver of the locomotive was injured.
- On 13 March 2015, SU45-079, in Trzcianka at around 14:10 on the Kopernika street railway crossing, locomotive collided with a Renault car. Leaving one driver dead and one passenger injured.
- On 27 April 2018, 301Db-143 collided with a car in Cychry, leaving only one person injured.

== Modifications ==
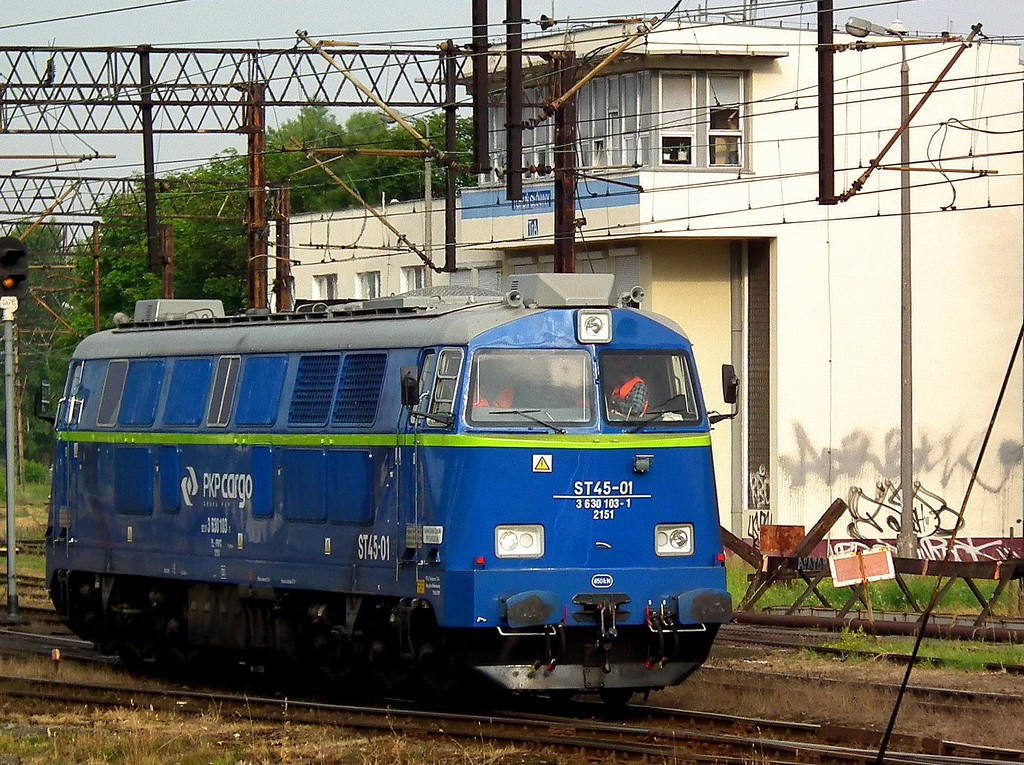
ST45-01 as a SU45 rebuild for PKP Cargo

New locomotives were too expensive for PKP Cargo so it decided to modernise its own locomotives, including SU45, so the SU45 locomotive modernization announcement appeared in the late 2007, as well as the start of modernizing. The SU45 locomotive reconstruction was made by Pesa Bydgoszcz on the basis of technical documentation prepared by the "Tabor" Railway Vehicle Institute, in which the agreement concluded between PKP Cargo and Pesa assuming the modernization of 20 locomotives for the Polish freight company.

The modernization started in 2007, in which the first locomotive rebuilt was SU45-112 being modernized in 2009 and reclassifed to ST45-01, next it was tested in May 29 on the Bydgoszcz - Laskowice Pomorskie route and back. ST45 locomotives were rebuilt between 2009 and 2012, rebuilding only 19 locomotives (3 locomotives supposed to be rebuilt but due to significant wear they were later scrapped instead).

The locomotives had MTU 4000 diesel engines with a rated power of 1500 kW (2040 hp) that meet the EURO 3 emission standards and had less weight, the elements of heating the composition were removed, air conditioning was installed, the electrical installation has been modified, Halogen and LED headlights were installed, multiple control sockets were removed (which have been replaced by one of transmitting information between on-board computers), and LS-90 cabin signalling system was equipped.

The locomotives were assigned to Kuyavian plant of PKP Cargo and were distributed around Kuyavian-Pomeranian Voivodeship, mostly on the Grudziądz - Terespol Pomorski route and around Toruń, hauling most likely gravel. ST45-04 was assigned to Czechowice-Dziedzice depot part of Silesian-Dąbrowa plant of PKP Cargo in 2010, in which mostly hauled newly built road vehicles from Fiat car factory in Tychy, more of the locomotives were brought to Czechowice-Dziedzice depot somehow in which they operated in different orders. In 2011 one of the locomotives obtained admission to traffic in the areas of Czech Republic (they also obtained admission to traffic in Slovakia).

Although the locomotives were not powerful enough compared with other modernized locomotives, they were too weak for operation. Some locomotives started its retirement in 2017, next in 2019 and most of the locomotives were retired in 2020. They were all displaced in Bydgoszcz, Skarżysko-Kamienna, Szczecinek, Jaworzno, Lublin and Czechowice-Dziedzice, and in 2024 they were put up for sale for electronic bidding.

== Nicknames ==
These locos used to be called by the following names:

- Fiat - because of the diesel engine licensed by Fiat
- Suka (eng. bitch) - from the two first letters of the code name (the SU46 series locomotive was more often called a "bitch" due to the greater engine power and the greater number of power shunting stages. SU45 is a locomotive with the same engine, but less power, which is why most drivers and railway enthusiasts pay attention to the gentler character of the SU45, which is why "Fiat" or "Fiacik" fits better)

== See also ==
- Polish locomotives designation
- PKP class SP45
