= PKP class EW90 =

EW90
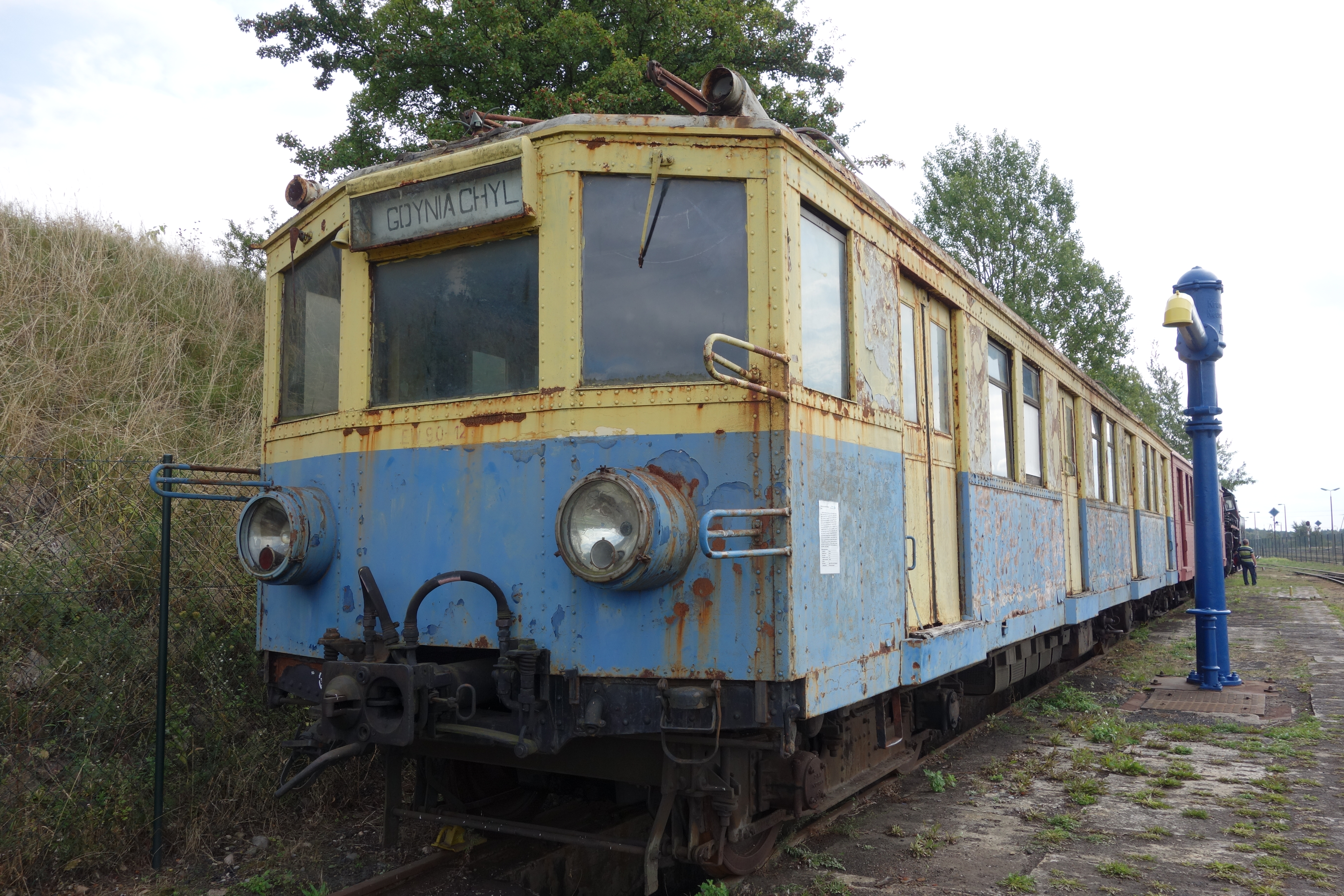
- EW90 at the Railway Museum Kościerzyna
Type and origin
- Power type: Electric
- Builder: AEG, O&K, Siemens, WUMAG
- Build date: 1928-1932
Specifications
- Configuration
  - AAR: s+d engine car + trailer
- Gauge: 1 435 mm
- Driver dia.: 900 mm
- Length: 34 460 mm
- Fuel type: Electric
- Electric system/s: 800 V.
- Current pickup(s): Pantograph
- Engine type: 4 x GBM700
- Transmission: 68:16
- Train brakes: Knorr EP
Performance figures
- Maximum speed: 80 km/h
- Power output: 308 kW
Career
- Operators: PKP
- Class: EW90
- Nicknames: Ewunia
- Retired: 1976

EW90 is the name for German Reichsbahn ET 165 electric multiple units working for Polish State Railways (PKP) after World War II.

== History ==
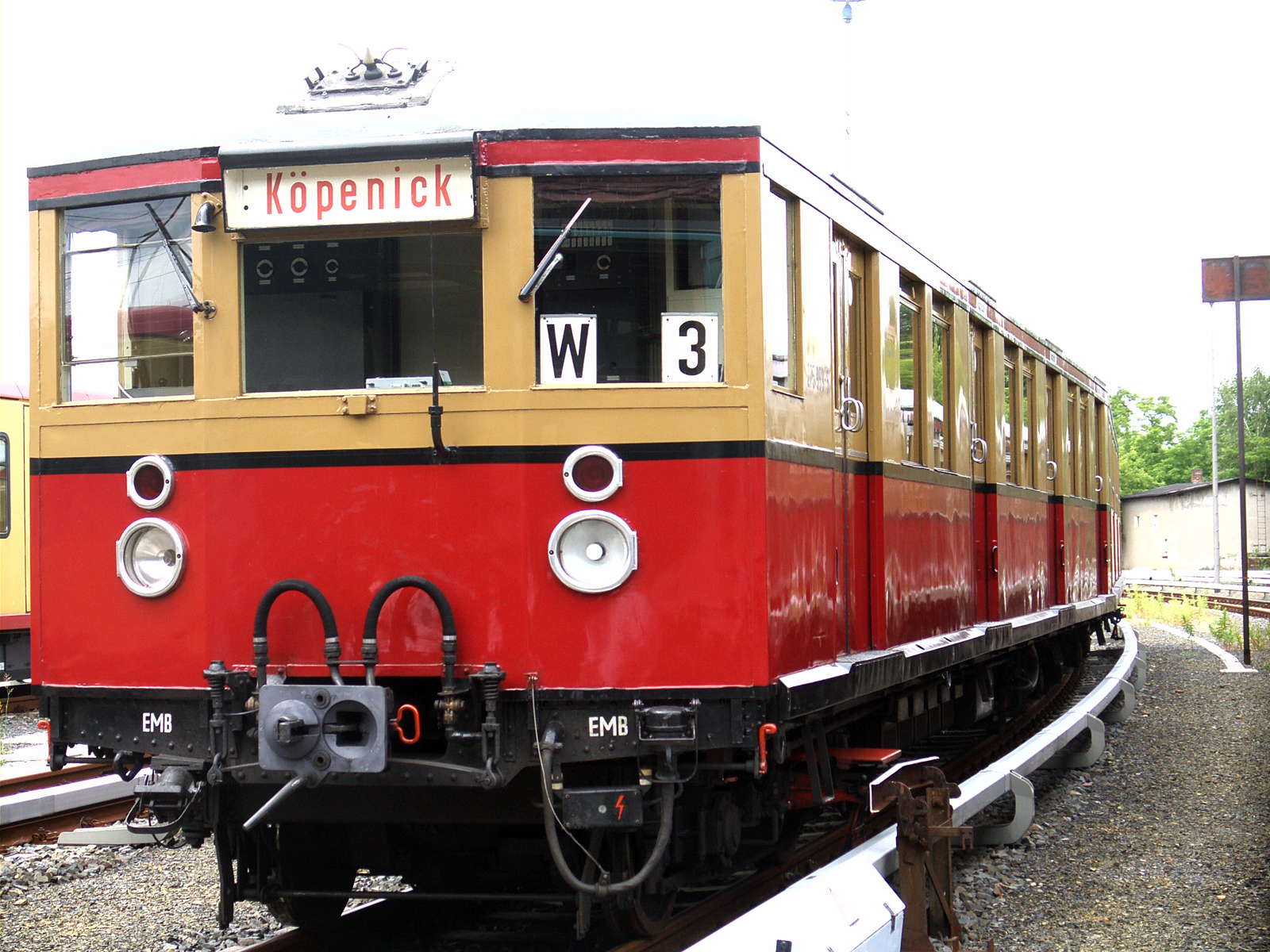
Berlin S-Bahn ET 165

The German ET 165 units were built in the period between 1928 and 1936 to service Berlin S-Bahn lines. While many units of this type were destroyed during the war, 189 ET 165, ET 166 and ET 167 vehicles were stabled in Schweidnitz (Świdnica), which after 1945 became part of Poland. As part of German reparations 54 were taken over by the PKP. From 1951 to 1957 were refurbished in Lubań as EW90, EW91 and EW92 units to service SKM lines in the Tricity area of Gdańsk, Sopot and Gdynia. It was necessary to rebuild cars to change the power supply from third rail system into pantographs.

EW90 EMUs finished their service in 1976 when the power supply on SKM lines changed from 800 V. into 3 000 V.

== Technical data ==
Each unit consisted of two cars: engine car and trailer. It was possible to connect four units in order to gain an eight car train.

GBM-700 type electric engines used in EW90, EW91 and EW92 units have four main poles and four commutation poles. Two-step reduction of engine excitation (up to 50%) is made by a short-circuit of parts of main poles. Engine cooling is done with a fan installed on the engines' shafts.

== See also ==
- Polish locomotives designation
