= PKP class SU46 =

PKP SU46
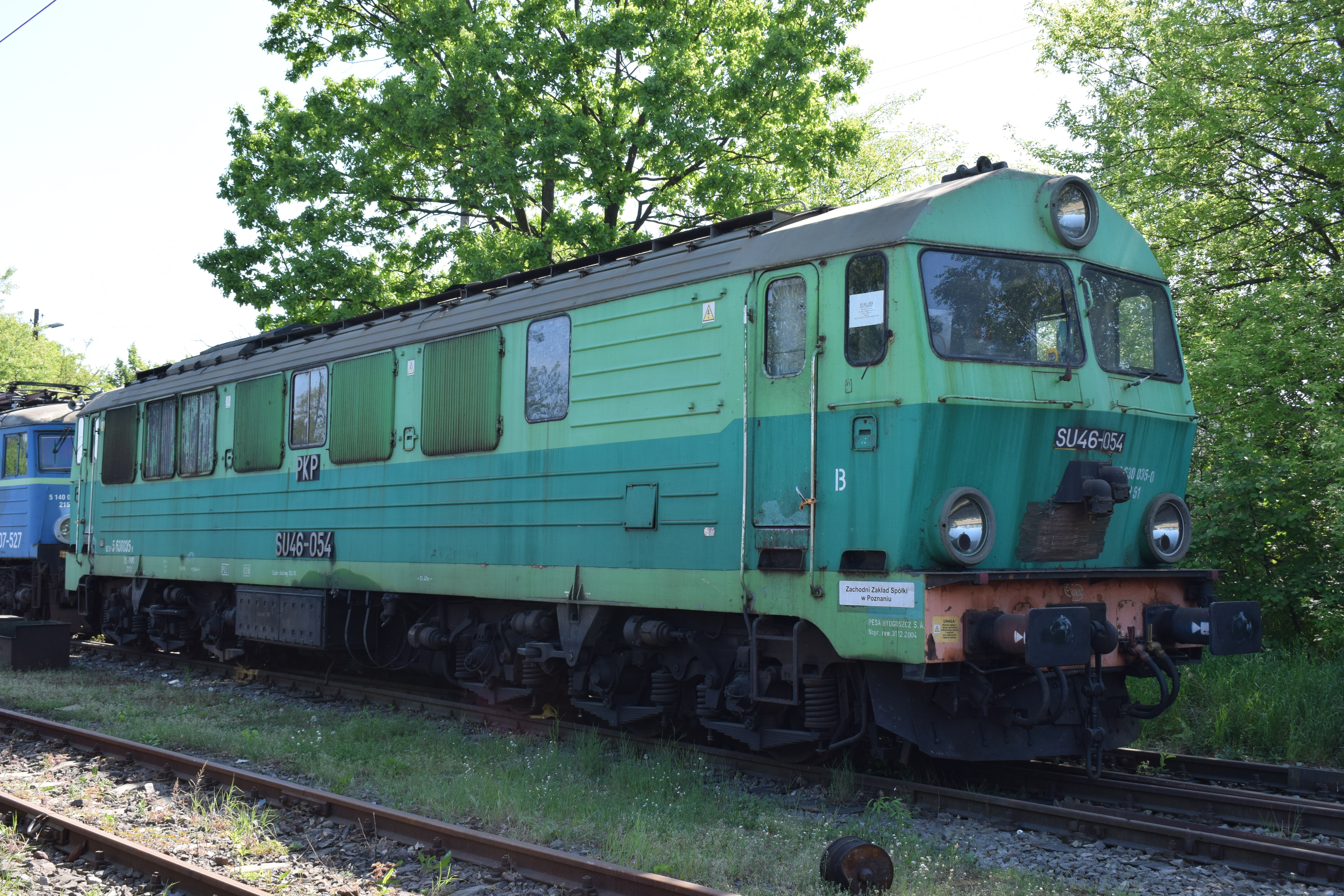
- SU46-054 locomotive
Type and origin
- Power type: Diesel
- Builder: Cegielski
- Serial number: 303D-268 through 303D-324 and ? (SU46-053, SU46-054)
- Build date: 1974–1978, 1985
- Total produced: 54
Specifications
- Configuration
  - UIC: Co′Co′
- Gauge: 1,435 mm (4 ft 8 1/2 in)
- Driver dia.: 1,100 mm (43.3 in)
- Length: 18,990 mm (62 ft 4 in)
- Width: 3,034 mm (9 ft 11 in)
- Height: 4,302 mm (14 ft 1 in)
- Axle load: 17.5 tonnes (17.2 long tons; 19.3 short tons)
- Loco weight: 105 tonnes (103 long tons; 116 short tons)
- Fuel type: Diesel
- Fuel capacity: 3,200 litres (700 imp gal; 850 US gal)
- RPM
  - RPM idle: (?)
  - Maximum RPM: 1,500 RPM
- Engine type: W2112SSF V12
- Aspiration: Turbochargered
- Cylinders: 12
- Cylinder size: 210 mm (8 in)
- Transmission: Diesel-electric
- MU working: Yes
- Loco brake: Oerlikon
- Train brakes: Air
- Safety systems: SHP, DSD
Performance figures
- Maximum speed: 120 km/h (75 mph)
- Power output: 1,655 kW (2,220 hp)
- Tractive effort: 326 kN (73,000 lbf)
Career
- Operators: PKP
- Class: SU46
- Nicknames: Suka (female dog)
- Current owner: PKP Cargo

SU46 (new symbol 5 630) is the name for a diesel universal purpose locomotive working for Polish PKP. Cegielski has produced 52 machines in years 1974-1977 and 2 modified in 1985.

== History ==
The 302D (class SP47) and 303D type (class SU46) locomotives are heavily improved version of 301Db type (class SP/SU45) diesel locomotive. Both of them has similar shape, but SP47 is a bit longer because of its 2116SSF diesel engine. SU46 uses a similar diesel engine as SP/SU45, but traction motors are totally different (this was enforced by usage of 3 kV electrical heating). Construction of SU46 was stopped in 1977, most likely due to communist government decisions. In 1985 additional two units of this class were built (numbers 053 and 054). They are slightly modified version of previous locomotives.

== Operation ==
Order of this locomotive was connected with increasing in 1970s demand on freight and passenger services on non-electrified railway lines. SU46 has a very universal characteristic, so it was possible to use them in passenger service and freight.

Today they are used in service on west Polish border (passenger and goods) and in Warmia and Masuria (goods train). Previously they were used also in passenger service on Hel Peninsula.

== See also ==
- Polish locomotives designation
