= PKP class ST45 =

ST45
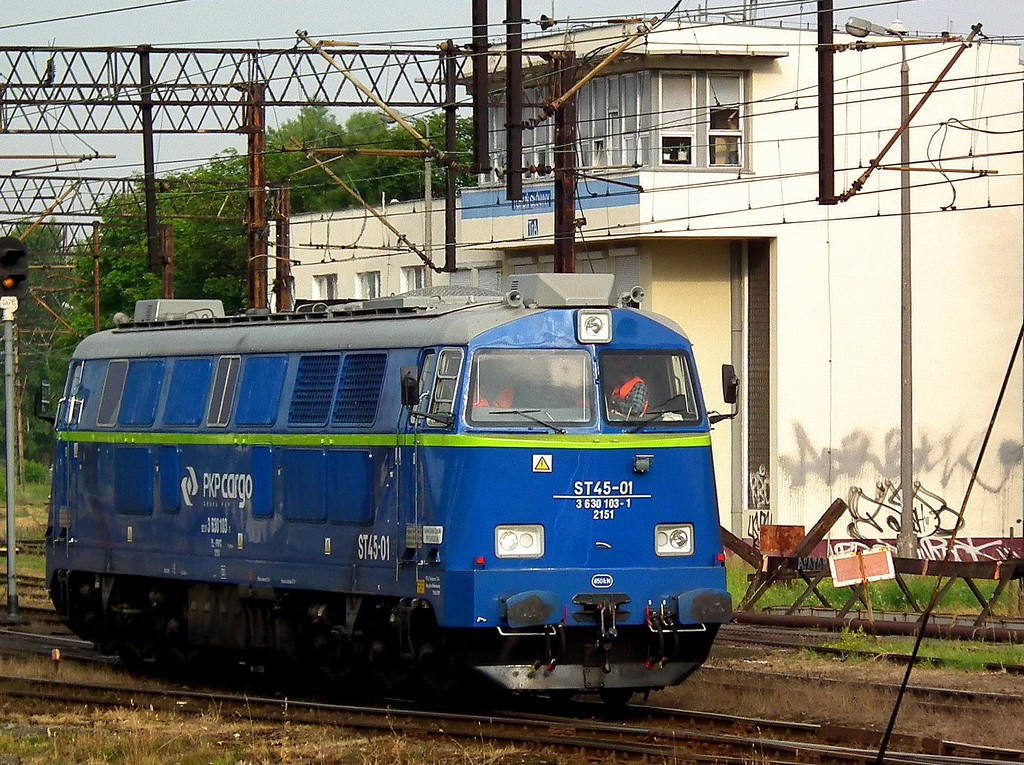
Type and origin
- Power type: Diesel
- Builder: PESA Bydgoszcz; SU45s built by Cegielski
- Build date: 2009
Specifications
- Configuration
  - UIC: Co′Co′
- Gauge: 1,435 mm (4 ft 8 1/2 in)
- Driver dia.: 1,100 mm
- Length: 18,990 mm
- Width: 3,900 mm
- Height: 4,288 mm
- Engine type: MTU 4000
- Cylinders: 12
- Transmission: Electric
- Loco brake: Oerlikon
Performance figures
- Maximum speed: 120 km/h (75 mph)
- Power output: 1,500 kilowatts (2,000 bhp)
Career
- Operators: PKP
- Class: ST45
- Number in class: 4
- Numbers: ST45-01—ST45-04
- Delivered: 2009

ST45 is the name for a Polish diesel locomotive. They are freight only locomotives, having had their train heating removed.

== History ==
These locomotives are SU45s with replacement engine and no train heating facilities. During 2009-2010 4 locomotives were rebuilt to class ST45.

=== Production ===
- ST45-01 (converted from SU45-112)
- ST45-02 (converted from SU45-238)
- ST45-03 (converted from SU45-254)
- ST45-04 (converted from SU45-240)

== See also ==
- Polish locomotives designation
