= PKP class SP47 =

Polish diesel locomotive

PKP SP47
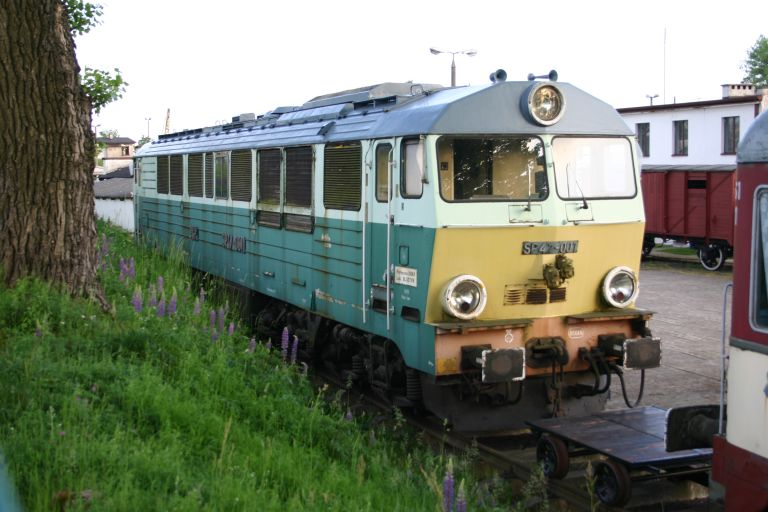
- SP47 locomotive in Skansen Parowozownia Kościerzyna
Type and origin
- Power type: Diesel-electric
- Builder: H. Cegielski - Poznań S.A.
- Build date: 1975, 1977
- Total produced: 2
Specifications
- Configuration
  - UIC: Co′Co′
- Gauge: 1,435 mm (4 ft 8 1/2 in) standard gauge
- Driver dia.: 1,100 mm (43.31 in)
- Length: 20,180 mm (66 ft 2 1/2 in)
- Width: 2,904 mm (9 ft 6 3/8 in)
- Height: 4,302 mm (14 ft 1 3/8 in)
- Loco weight: 114 t (112 long tons; 126 short tons)
- Fuel type: Diesel
- Fuel capacity: 5,500 L (1,200 imp gal; 1,500 US gal)
- RPM
  - Maximum RPM: 1,500 RPM
- Engine type: 2116SSF
- Aspiration: Turbocharged
- Cylinders: 16
- Cylinder size: 210 mm (8.3 in) × ?
- Transmission: Electric
- MU working: Yes
- Loco brake: Oerlikon
- Train brakes: Air
- Safety systems: Samoczynne Hamowanie Pociągu, DSD
Performance figures
- Maximum speed: 140 km/h (87 mph)
- Power output: 2,210 kW (3,000 hp)
- Tractive effort: 380 kN (85,000 lbf)
Career
- Operators: PKP
- Class: SP47
- Nicknames: Długa Suka
- Disposition: One preserved, one scrapped

SP47 was a code name for a Polish diesel locomotive, designed for passenger transport. It never reached serial production.

== History ==
SP47 was supposed to be an export hit of the Cegielski Works. Unfortunately, due to political decisions only two prototypes of this locomotive were ever built. SP47 was the most modern Polish locomotive in those times, and one of the most modern in Europe.

=== Prototypes ===
The design of the locomotive, later code-named SP47, was drawn up in 1972. Its design was based on the design of the PKP class SP45. In 1974 construction started at the Cegielski workshop in Poznań, but, on finishing the first one, the decision was taken to terminate diesel locomotives production in Poland. The reason for this was the danger that Polish locomotives would compete with the Soviet ones; in fact SP47 was by far better than any Soviet locomotive.

The second prototype (following a great struggle) was completed in 1977.

=== Career ===
Both locomotives were dispatched to Olsztyn, where they worked until their end. The second prototype suffered a serious engine failure a few months after entering service. As a result, in 1991 it was set aside, and in 1998 taken out of service and scrapped in 2001. The first of two prototypes run until a serious engine failure in 1997.

SP47-001 is currently (after exterior renovation) exhibited at the Railway Museum in Kościerzyna heritage park.

== See also ==
- Polish locomotives designation
