= PKP class SP45 =

SP45
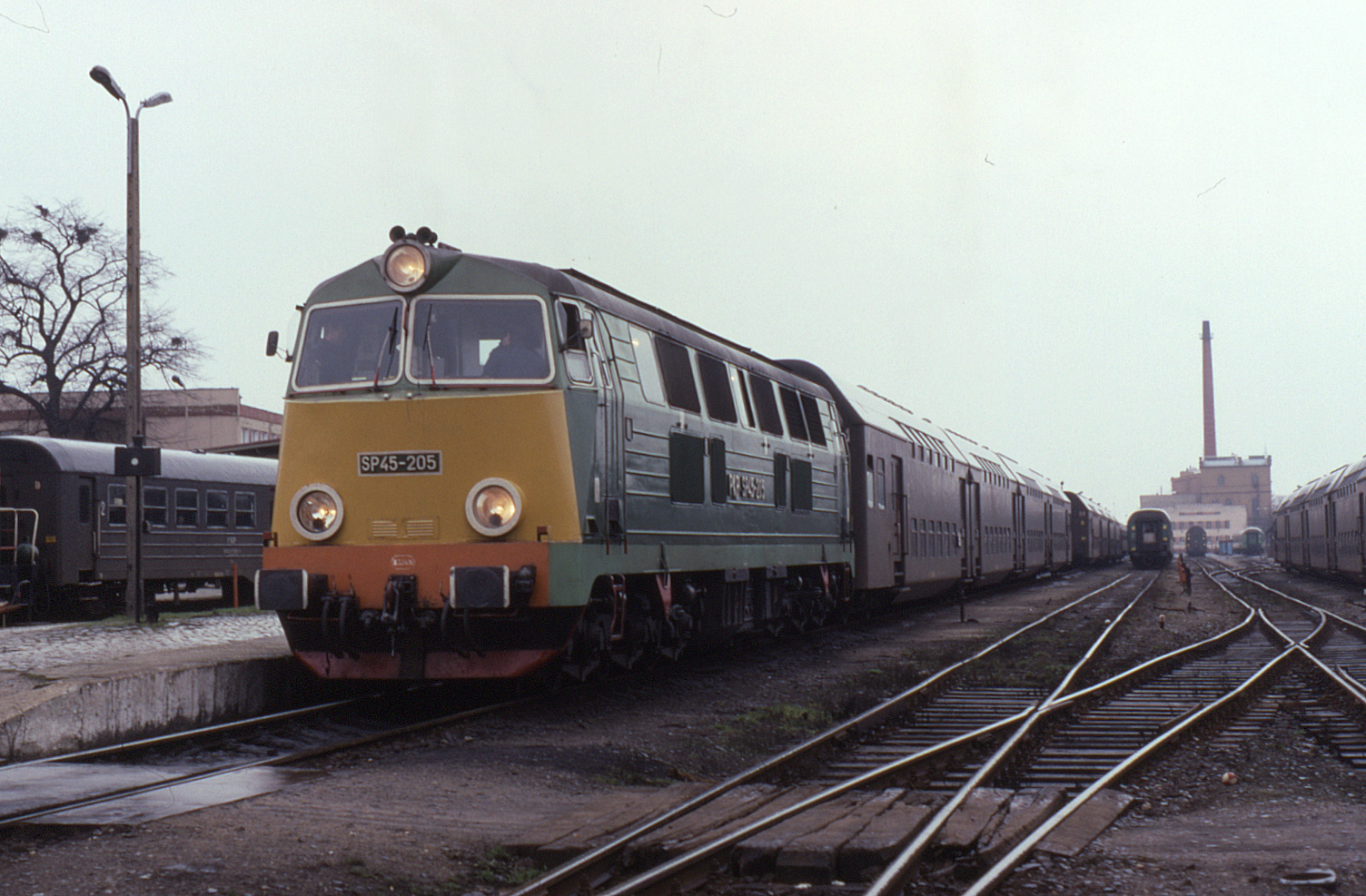
- SP45-205 with a local train in Leszno
Type and origin
- Power type: Diesel-electric
- Builder: Cegielski
- Model: 301Db
- Build date: 1970–1976
- Total produced: 268
Specifications
- Configuration
  - AAR: C-C
  - UIC: Co′Co′
- Gauge: 1,435 mm (4 ft 8 1/2 in) standard gauge
- Driver dia.: 1,100 mm (43.31 in)
- Wheel diameter: 1,100 mm (43.31 in)
- Wheelbase: 3,900 mm (153.54 in)
- Length: 18,990 mm (62 ft 3 5/8 in)
- Width: 2,900 mm (9 ft 6 1/8 in)(?)
- Height: 3,900 mm (12 ft 9 1/2 in)(?)
- Axle load: 17 t (17 long tons; 19 short tons)
- Loco weight: 102 t (100 long tons; 112 short tons)
- Fuel type: Diesel Fuel
- Fuel capacity: 3,200 L (700 imp gal; 850 US gal)
- Fuel consumption: Max. 300 L per 100 km (66 imp gal, 79 US gal per 62 miles)
- Prime mover: 2112SSF
- RPM
  - Maximum RPM: 1500 rpm
- Engine type: Four-stroke 12-cylinder diesel engine
- Aspiration: Turbocharger
- Displacement: 95.5 L
- Generator: GP-8461B1
- Traction motors: LSa-430
- Cylinders: 12
- Cylinder size: 210 mm (8.27 in) x (?)
- Transmission: Electric 700 V
- Gear ratio: 19:64
- MU working: yes
- Train heating: Vapor OK-4616 Steam generator
- Loco brake: Oerlikon
- Train brakes: Air
- Safety systems: SHP
- Couplers: Screw coupler
Performance figures
- Maximum speed: 120 km/h (75 mph)
- Power output: 1,750 hp (1,300 kW)
- Tractive effort: 320 kN (72,000 lb_{f})
Career
- Operators: PKP
- Class: SP45
- Numbers: 001 - 265
- Official name: HCP 301D
- Nicknames: Fiat
- Delivered: 1970
- First run: 1970
- Last run: 1999
- Retired: 1999
- Scrapped: early 2000s
- Current owner: Skansen Kościerzyna (139)
- Disposition: 1 preserved, remainder converted or scrapped

SP45 (prototype 301Da, current type 301Db, Lebanese type 301Dc) is a Polish standard gauge mainline passenger diesel locomotive built by H. Cegielski in Poznań from 1970 to 1976, they were intended for operating express and local trains on non-electrified railway lines around Poland. The third locomotive type 301Dc was built for Lebanese Railways in Lebanon.

== Origins ==
=== Before the prototype ===
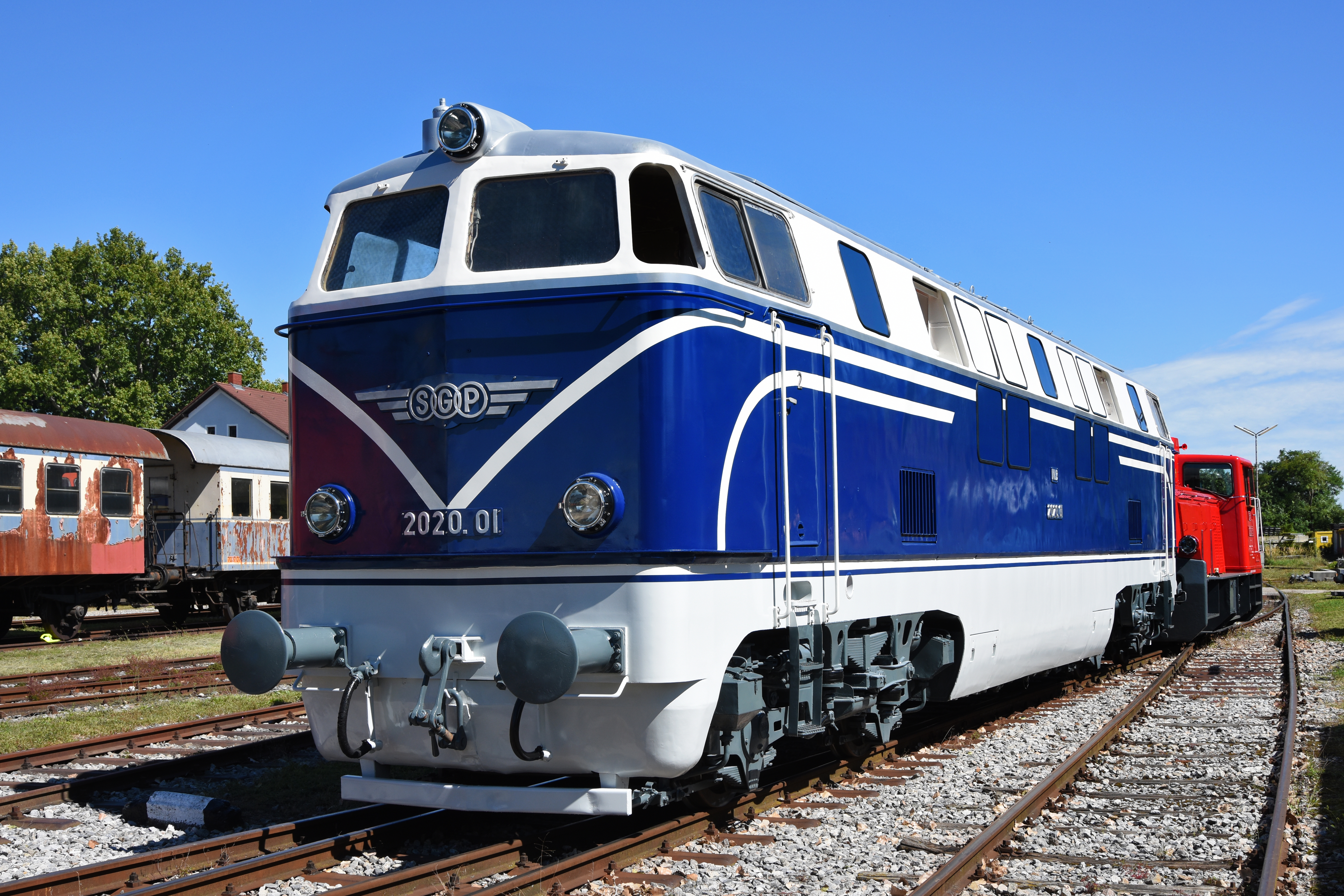
SGP 2020.01 prototype that was tested in Poland for PKP dieselisation now preserved in Austria

Steam locomotive orders were declined in 1957 for the Polish railway dieselisation, in which the development of new diesel locomotives were necessary, but not for the mainline locomotives. In 1961 the Austrian diesel hydraulic locomotive prototype SGP 2020.01 was tested by PKP, the tests were successful, but due to the license production of this locomotive it wasn't necessary, and wasn't ever ordered by PKP. It was then decided to develop a new mainline locomotive to run on non-electrified railway lines, which was then started by Central Construction Bureau or Railway Stock Industry (CBKPTK) in 1963.

The first locomotive made by Cegielski was SU45-001, it was only designed for mixed traffic, but due to the failed test results from the design problems, it was later scrapped and then focused on the second type of the locomotive intended only for Passenger traffic.

=== Prototype ===
After the failed SU45 locomotive tests, with no other decisions, it was decided to sign an agreement with FIAT Grandi Motori from Turin in Italy for engine production in HCP under its license. The locomotive was supposed to be made in two variants; passenger locomotive (SP45) and freight locomotive (ST45), only the passenger version was made instead.

The first SP45 prototype designated 301Da was made in 1968 by H. Cegielski, equipped with imported components (Brown-Boveri GD-803 main generator, Marelli exciter and Fiat 2112SSF diesel engine) and numbered 002 as its fleet number, also with some design changes. It was presented in Poznań International Fairs after it was built and then took its first test runs, the test results were successful and was bought by PKP in 1971 changing its fleet number to 002 to avoid confusion with the standard production variant.

=== Successful example ===
Although the tests were successful, the locomotive had some problems while operating, it was then decided to make the third prototype designated as 301Db redesigning it again. The second SP45 prototype (or third 301D prototype) was made in 1970, the difference was the main generator being built under Alsthom license, fuel tank redesigned, improved engine compartment ventilation, installed driver's cab heating system, and other technical redesigns. The first tests runs occurred in July 1970, after in which the test results were way more successful that the second prototype, and it was decided to start a serial production of this prototype, producing in total 265 locomotives from 1970 to 1976, after 3 years of development, SP45 finally became a successful example of Poznań's rolling stock industry. The third prototype (SP45-001) was also bought by PKP in 1971, its service lasted only 4 years when in 1975 was withdrawn of service due to a fire.

== Locomotive assignment ==
Locomotives numbers	Operator	Remarks
139	Kościerzyna - heritage park	as an exhibit

== Nicknames ==
These locomotives used to be called the following names:

- Fiat - because of diesel engine licensed by Fiat
- Suka (eng. bitch) - from the two first letters of the code name (SUka - after conversion to SU45 class)

== See also ==
- Polish locomotives designation
