= Shortlines =

Polish rail operator

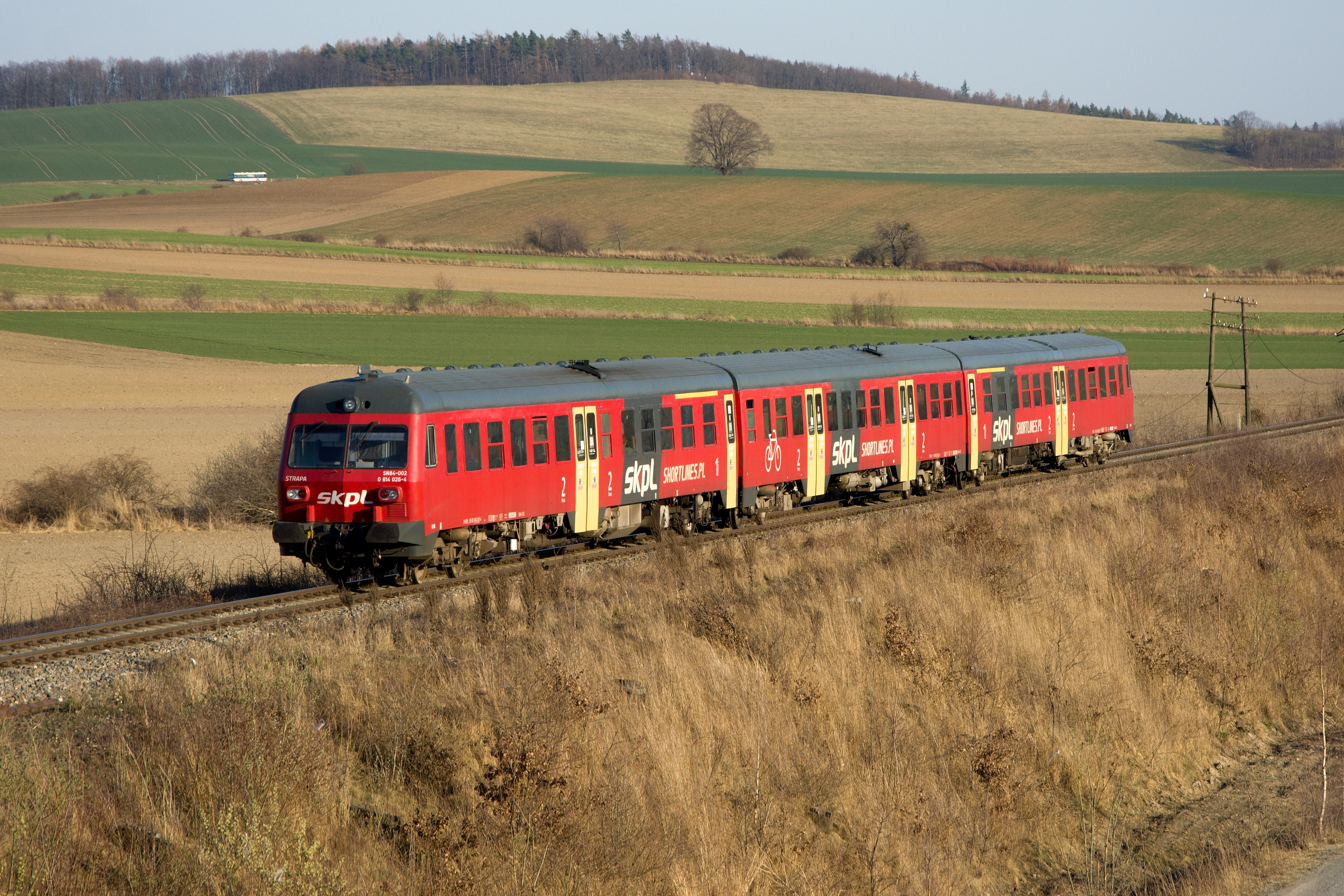
- Diesel multiple unit of SKPL
- Native name: Stowarzyszenie Kolejowych Przewozów Lokalnych
- Type: Limited company
- Industry: Rail transport
- Founded: 18 March 2001
- Headquarters: Zbiersk Cukrownia 54, 62-830 Zbiersk, Zbiersk, Poland
- Number of locations: 5 rolling stock maintenance areas
- Area served: Greater Poland Voivodeship; Podkarpackie Voivodeship
- Key people: Tomasz Strapagiel
- Website: http://en.shortlines.pl/ http://www.skpl.pl/

Shortlines (Polish: Stowarzyszenie Kolejowych Przewozów Lokalnych; SKPL lit. 'Association of Local Railway Transport') is a Polish railway voluntary association founded in 2001 in Kalisz. Its subsidiary, SKPL Cargo Sp. z o.o., is an operator of both passenger and freight traffic in Poland, while another subsidiary, SKPL Infrastruktura i Linie Kolejowe Sp. z o.o., maintains railway lines on behalf of local governments.

== Rolling stock ==
=== Diesel locomotives ===
Locomotive class	Original class	Locomotive series	Build date	Purchase date	Number	Owner
SU175	DSB Class ME	001, 003, 1503, 1505, 1522	1981, 1983, 1985	2022	5	SKPL
SU45	–	115	1974 (as SP45), rebuilt in 1992	2016	1	SKPL Cargo
ST43	–	115, 388, 389	1967, 1974	2019, 2020	3	SKPL Cargo
SM42	–	678, 1013, 1107, 1108, 2622	1974, 1978, 1987, 1989	2014, 2021, 2022	5	SKPL Cargo, Pol-Trans, TrainSpeed
SM31	–	021, 025, 111	1977, 1980, 1984	2014, 2020, 2024	3	SKPL Cargo
LDH45	–	025	1988	2014	1	SKPL Cargo
TGM40	–	0509, 0586, 0716, 0718	1989	2004	4	SKPL Cargo
401Da	–	043, 216	1972, 1975	2009, 2014	2	SKPL Cargo
SM03	–	12, 437, 497	?	?	3	SKPL Cargo
SM30	–	703, 707, 892	1964, 1967	2020	2	SKPL Cargo
S200	–	S-249, S-257, 258, S-260, S-280, S-2111, S-2137	1983, 1984, 1988, 1990	2016, 2017, 2018, 2019, 2022	7	SKPL Cargo
T448p	–	036, 087	1978, 1979	2016, 2024	2	SKPL Cargo
T458	–	1509	1965	2015	1	SKPL Cargo
