= PKP class SM32 =

Polish diesel locomotive

401Da
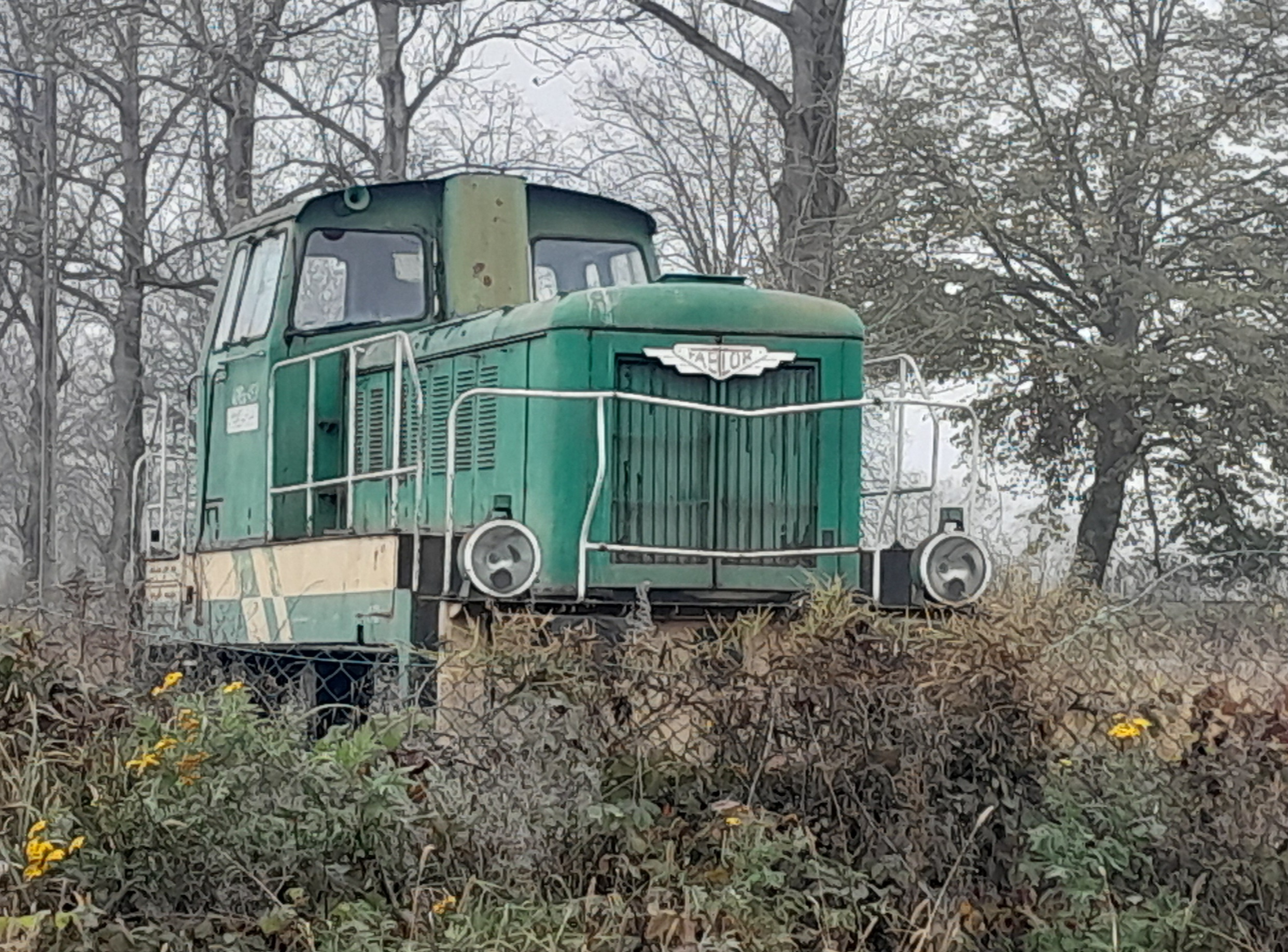
- 401Da-451 near Mrokocin
Type and origin
- Power type: Diesel-electric
- Builder: Fablok
- Build date: 1966–1979
- Total produced: 500
Specifications
- Configuration
  - AAR: C
  - UIC: C'
- Gauge: 1435 mm
- Wheel diameter: 1,100 mm (43 in)
- Wheelbase: 4,400 mm (170 in)
- Length: 10,140 mm (399 in)
- Width: 3,190 mm (126 in)
- Height: 4,078 mm (160.6 in)
- Axle load: 13.5 t (13.3 long tons; 14.9 short tons)
- Service weight: 40.5 t (39.9 long tons; 44.6 short tons)
- Fuel capacity: 1,810 kg (3,990 lb)
- Engine type: 12V1416A
- Traction motors: Coupling rods
- Transmission: electric
- Train brakes: Air
Performance figures
- Maximum speed: 60 km/h (37 mph)
- Power output: 257 kW
Career
- Operators: Industrial and private companies
- Class: 401Da
- First run: 1971

Fablok 401D and 401Da (factory type Ls350E, initially series PKP SM31, later SM32) is a Polish switcher diesel locomotive, produced between 1966 and 1979 in a total of 501 units by Fablok in Chrzanów.

The 401D locomotive was designed to replace the 1D diesel engine. Its design was completed in 1964, and a prototype was built two years later. During trial operation by the Polish State Railways, some design flaws were discovered, leading to the creation of a modified version, the 401Da, in 1968. From 1970 to 1979, 500 units of this vehicle were produced for the Polish industry. Projects for versions 406D and 415D were also developed but not realized. After the production of the 401Da locomotives ended, Fablok began building the 411D model.

== History ==
=== Origins and design ===
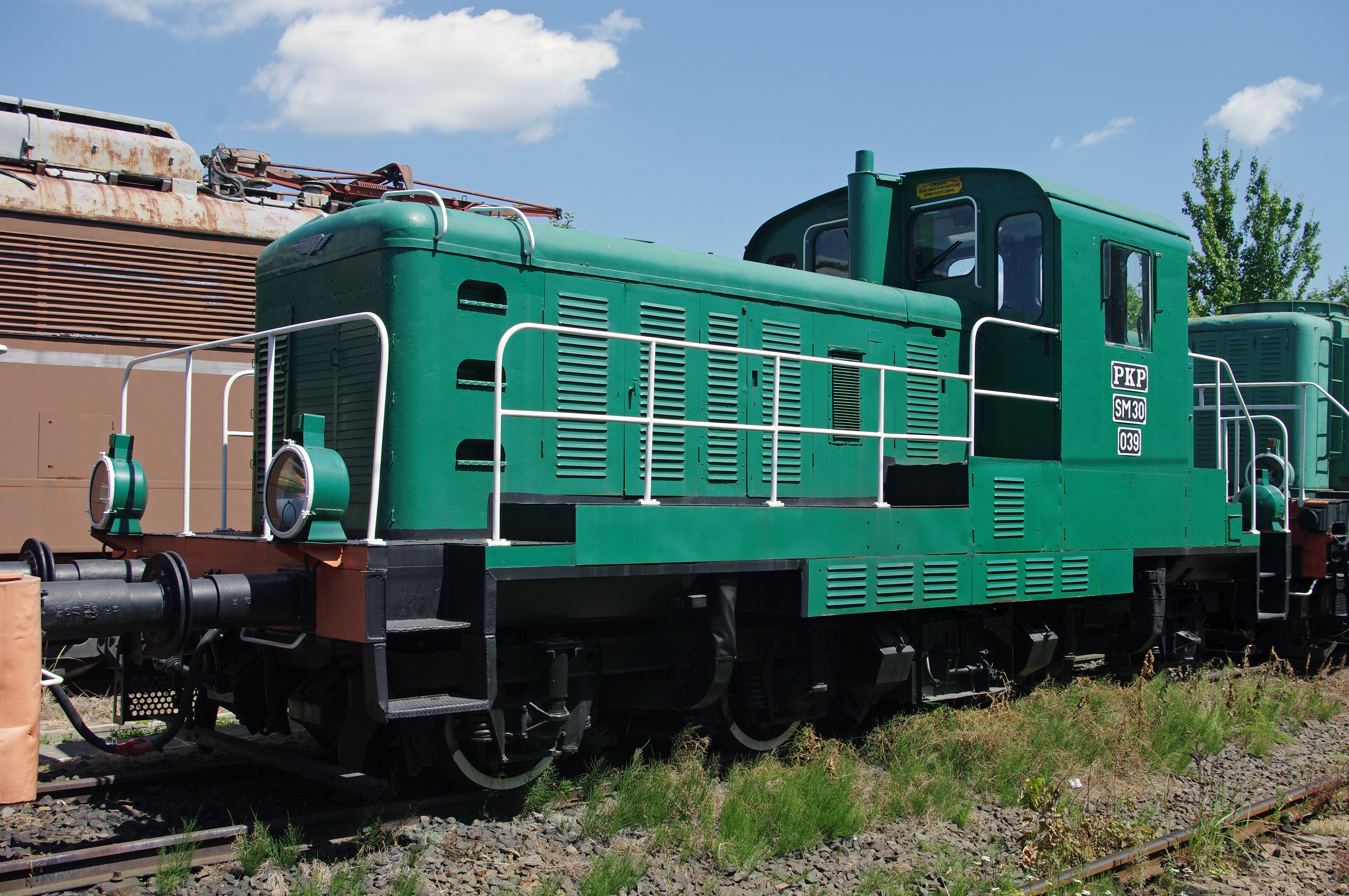
Diesel locomotive series SM30

In 1955, the Tabor Railway Vehicle Institute in Poznań completed the documentation for the 1D type diesel locomotive, and production began the following year at the Fablok factory in Chrzanów. This 300-horsepower locomotive was equipped with an electric transmission and was intended for medium shunting and light line work. It was supplied to Polish State Railways, which initially designated it with the Lwe55 series, later changing it to SM30, as well as to the industrial sector. In the 1960s, due to plans to replace this diesel locomotive with a more modern model with better performance, several new shunting locomotives were designed.

In June 1964, the Tabor Railway Vehicle Institute completed the documentation for a 350-horsepower diesel locomotive with an electric transmission. Besides the desire to replace the 1D type locomotives, this design was motivated by the absence of a domestic hydraulic transmission of that power and the inability to acquire such a device from countries within the Eastern Bloc, while Poland could not afford to purchase the Voith transmission using foreign currency. Nevertheless, the designers believed that the technical level of the new model with an electric transmission was comparable to diesel locomotives with hydraulic transmissions. Furthermore, by designing the locomotive with an electric transmission, it was possible to standardize its components and electrical equipment with medium and high-power diesel locomotives and utilize the repair base of Zakłady Naprawcze Taboru Kolejowego adapted for the maintenance of electric transmission diesel locomotives. The new locomotive was initially designated as design type 10D, which was later changed to 401D. The leading designer was Roman Nowak, who, along with Ryszard Szerbart, was responsible for the mechanical part of the diesel locomotive. The electrical part was designed under the leadership of Alojzy Kiełkiewicz and Aleksander Płatkiewicz. The design team also included A. Mróz, R. Zgorzelak, S. Wróblewski, and T. Kwapisz. The production of the locomotive was entrusted to the Fablok factory, which additionally designated it with the factory type Ls350E.

=== Production and design modifications ===
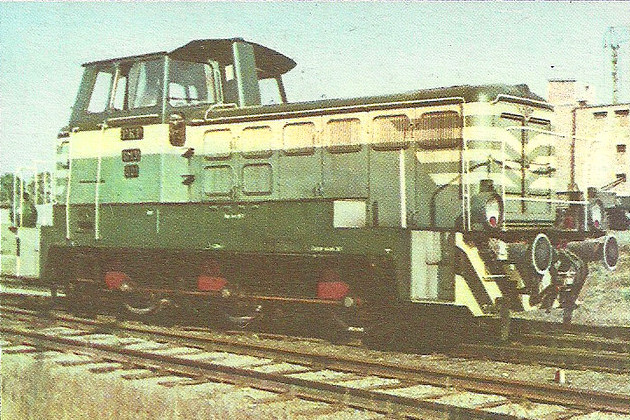
SM31-001 for the Polish State Railways (1966)

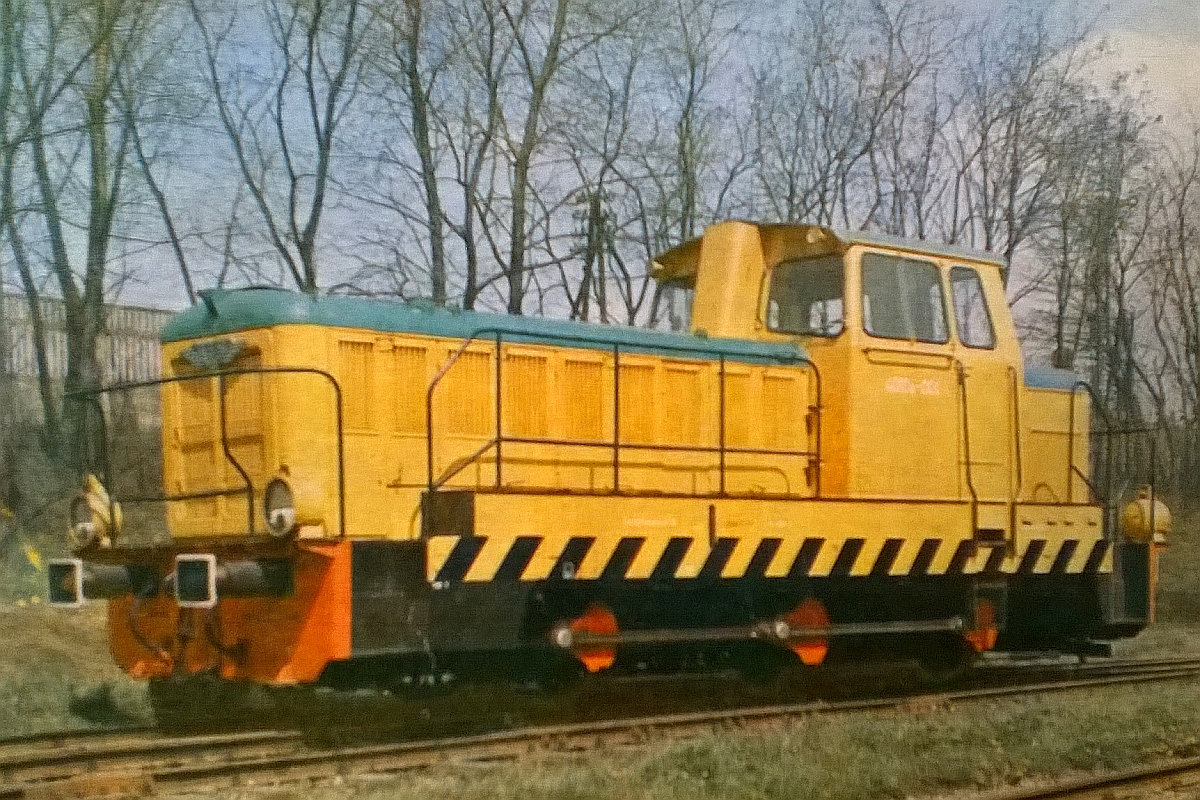
401Da-001 for the industry (1970)

In the third quarter of 1964, Fablok began the production of the prototype 401D diesel locomotive, and it was initially planned that it would be completed by the end of 1965. However, the locomotive was finished in the third quarter of 1966 and designated by Polish State Railways as SM31-001. During its trial operation, construction flaws were revealed, and as a result, the railway operator was not interested in additional units. Due to these issues and the discontinuation of the production of the engine used in the prototype, Tabor Railway Vehicle Institute decided to modify the design. In 1968, the technical documentation for the 401Da locomotive was developed, which differed from the original version, notably with the drive system. Two prototypes were produced in the first quarter of 1970, and by the end of 1971, an information series was built.

In August 1972, testing and trial operations of the first two units were concluded, confirming the correctness of the design parameters, good traction properties, and suitability for shunting operations in industrial plants. Key advantages of the locomotive included good visibility from the driver's cabin, ease of control, and reliability of the components used. In December of the same year, the Industry Advisory Commission at Tabor Railway Vehicle Institute evaluated the 401Da locomotive design and classified it into group A of modern products with a validity period until 1977. Serial production of this locomotive continued in subsequent years.

Meanwhile, in 1967, Tabor Railway Vehicle Institute developed the concepts for the 406D locomotive, a modified version of the 401D that was to become a second-category locomotive in the CMEA-OSJD classification and a class C locomotive in the UIC-ORE classification. This version was planned to include a new drive system with a turbocharged engine. It was expected that the documentation and prototype would be ready by 1975, with serial production commencing between 1976 and 1980. However, the project was delayed, and the documentation's completion was deemed dependent on demand for such vehicles. Ultimately, the locomotive was not produced.

In 1977, the Institute of Railway Vehicles at the Tadeusz Kościuszko Kraków University of Technology, after studying the behavior of the 401Da locomotive on curves two years earlier, analyzed the possibility of using a different type of suspension. The modified locomotive was designated as 401Db and later 415D. However, production of this variant also did not take place.

By 1979, a total of 500 units of the 401Da locomotives were produced. Despite numerous orders for this type of locomotive from industrial customers, production was discontinued, and construction of the 411D locomotives began.

==== Production overview ====
Year	Type	Number of units	Designations
1966	401D	1	SM31-001
1970	401Da	2	401Da-001 ÷ 002
1971	401Da	8	401Da-003 ÷ 010
1972	401Da	23	401Da-011 ÷ 033
1973	401Da	86	401Da-034 ÷ 119
1974	401Da	38	401Da-120 ÷ 157
1975	401Da	113	401Da-158 ÷ 270
1976	401Da	67	401Da-271 ÷ 337
1977	401Da	80	401Da-338 ÷ 417
1978	401Da	40	401Da-418 ÷ 457
1979	401Da	43	401Da-458 ÷ 500

== Design ==
The 401D type locomotives and their derivatives are medium-power switcher diesel locomotives, adapted for use on standard gauge tracks (1,435 mm). According to the designers, these locomotives can also be used on broad gauge tracks (1,520/1,524 mm) with minor modifications to their construction.

These locomotives are primarily intended for medium-duty shunting operations at stations and marshalling yards, as well as for shunting tasks in industrial plants. Additionally, they are capable of hauling light freight trains and passenger trains, but only during the summer months, as they lack the ability to heat the carriages.

=== 401D ===
The base model 401D locomotive is 9,640 mm long, 3,150 mm wide, and 4,280 mm high, with a service weight of 40.7 tons. The frame is constructed from 24 mm thick steel plates, welded electrically. On both sides of the frame, a box-structure walkway is bolted in place. Each of the frame's side beams has three journal openings with welded guides. The body consists of a longer engine compartment at the front, a centrally positioned driver's cab, and a shorter compressor compartment with an electrical cabinet at the rear.

The locomotive is equipped with three axles. The two outer axles, spaced 4,200 mm apart, are powered by traction motors, while the centrally positioned axle is driven via coupling rods. The wheelsets, housed within the frame, feature spoked wheels with a diameter of 1,100 mm. The suspension system consists of flat leaf springs.

The 401D's powertrain includes a 350-horsepower 3DVS diesel engine produced by Wola and an LSPa-493 dynamo from Dolmel, with their shafts connected via a flexible clutch. The two outer axles are driven by LSa-430 electric motors, also manufactured by Dolmel.

=== 401Da ===
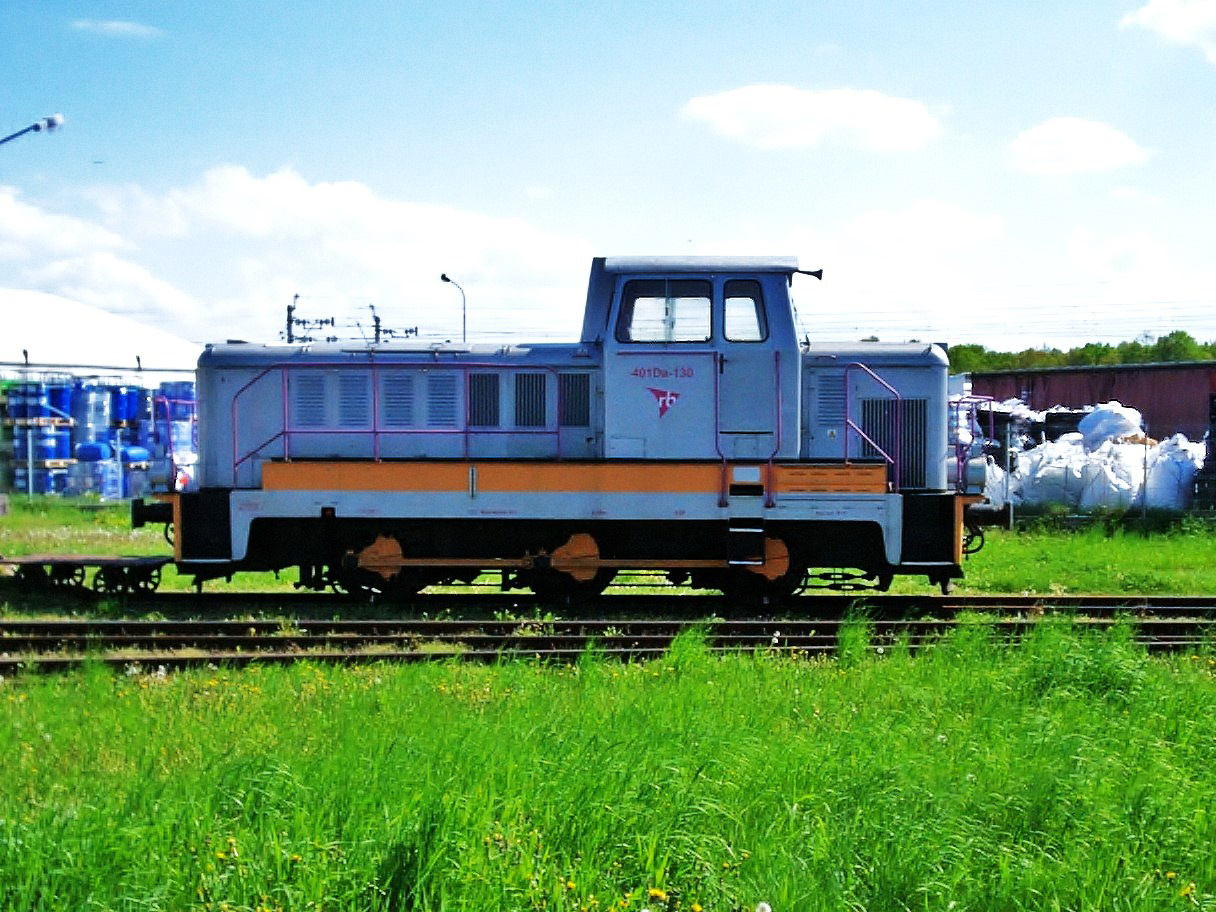
401Da-130 from the side

The 401Da version is longer (10,140 mm), wider (3,190 mm), lower (4,078 mm), and slightly lighter (40.5 tons) than its predecessor. The spacing of the outer axles was increased to 4,400 mm. This version is powered by a 12-cylinder 12V1416A diesel engine, producing 350 hp. The engine, manufactured by Wola under a Rheinstahl Henschel license, replaced the previous model. Additionally, the main generator was upgraded to the LSPb-493. The locomotive lacks multiple-unit operation capability.

=== 406D ===
The 406D locomotive, according to initial plans, was to be equipped with a turbocharged Wola H12 engine producing 530 hp and a dual-bearing main generator. It was also designed to feature a third traction motor and an increased weight of 50 tons. However, the project was never realized.

=== 415D ===
The 415D version was planned to include a new journal suspension system consisting of wedge-type rubber-metal springs. This modification would have required the removal of the middle axle, which was previously linked to the outer axles via coupling rods. The project did not advance beyond the design stage.

== Operation ==
=== Polish State Railways ===
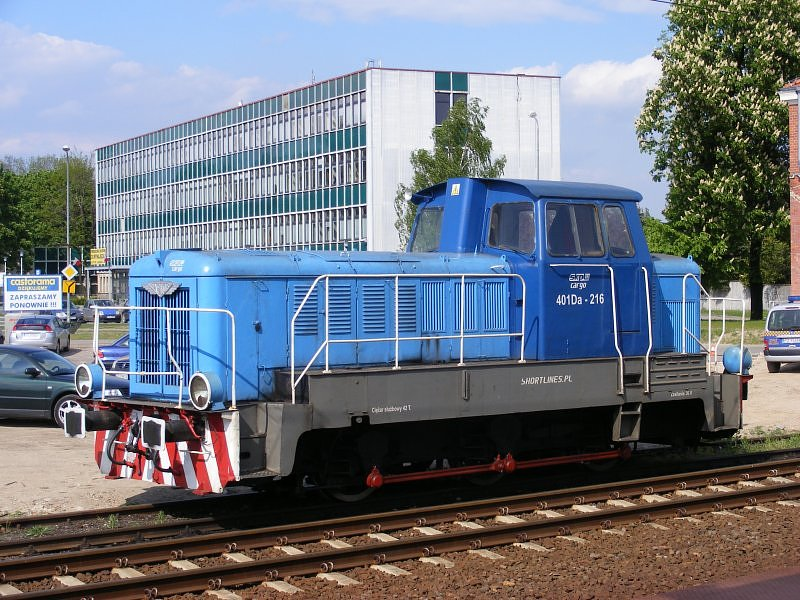
401Da-216, Association of Local Railway Transport (2014)

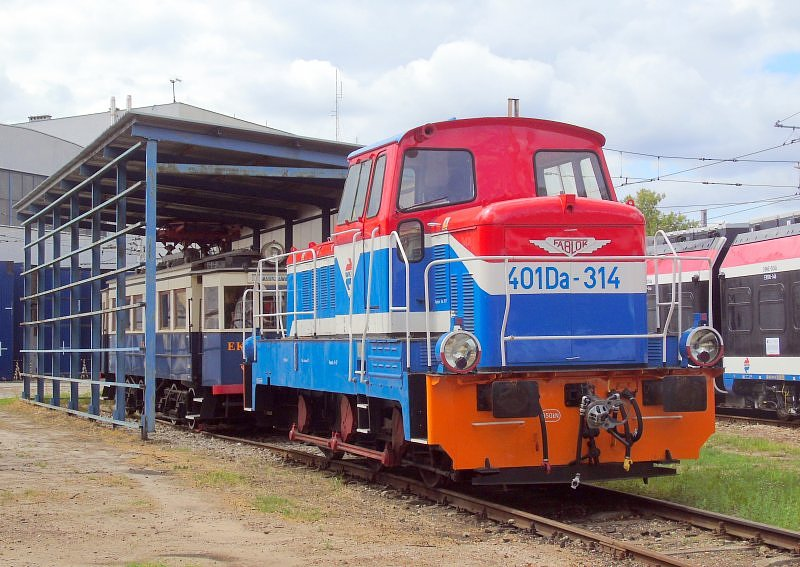
401Da-314, Warsaw Commuter Railway (2016)

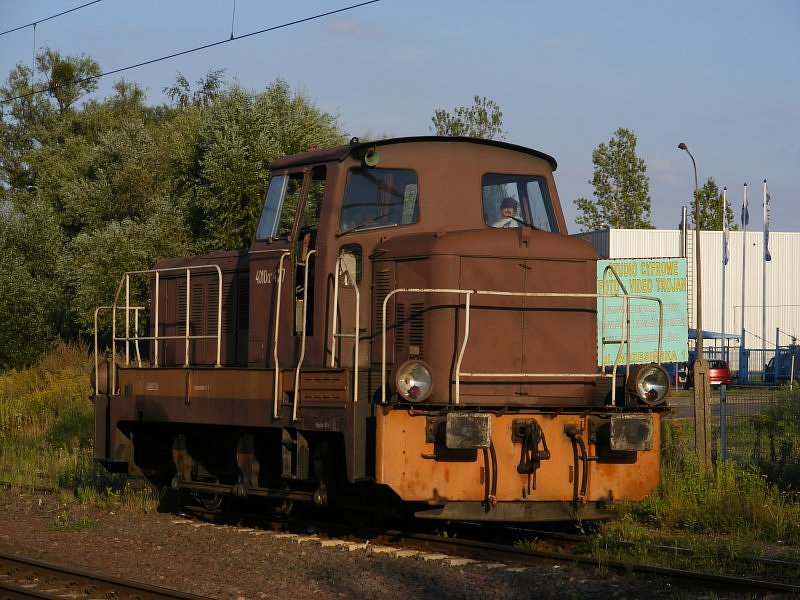
401Da-427, Tabor Railway Vehicle Institute (2012)

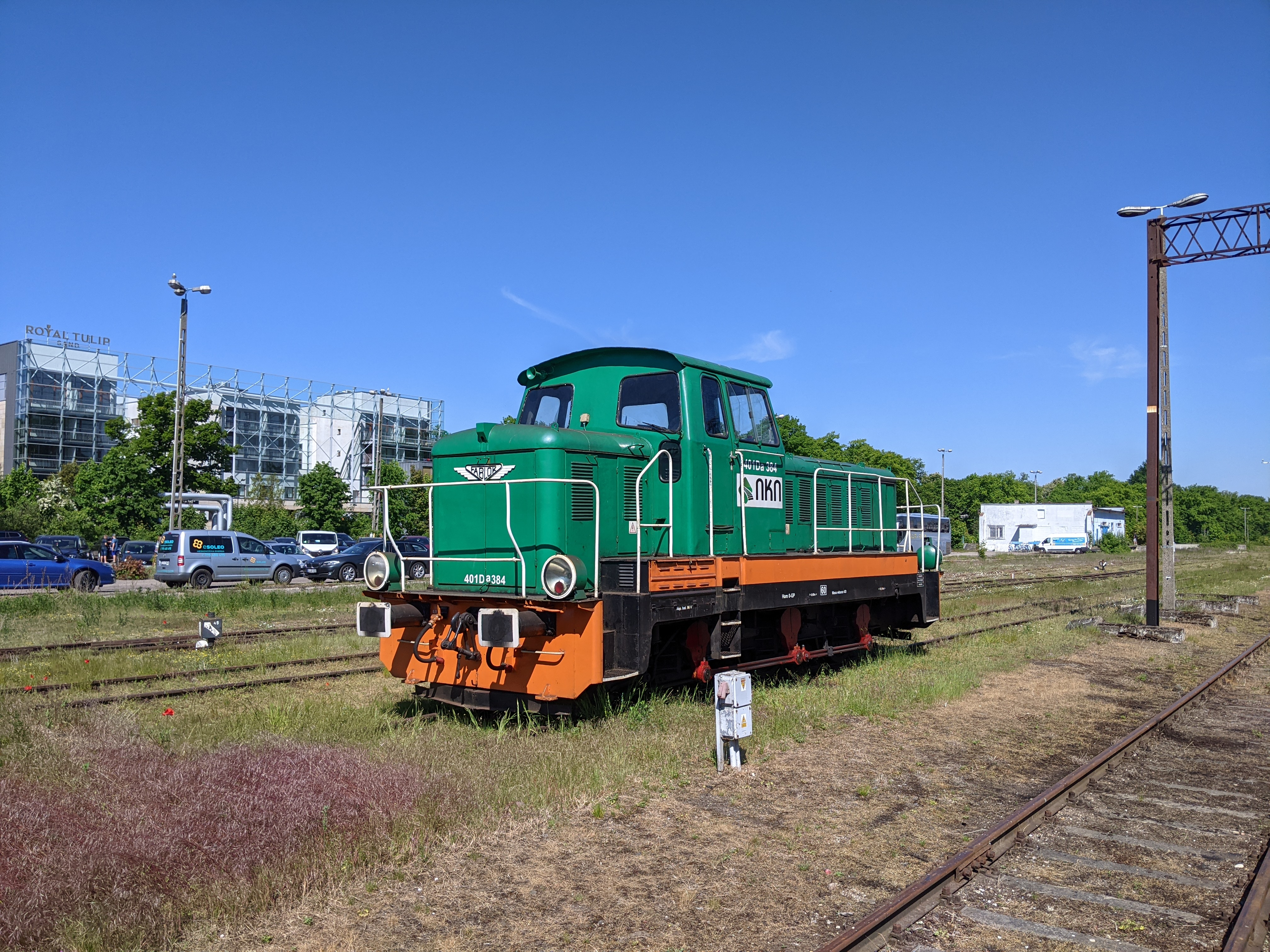
401Da-384, NKN Railway Services (2021)

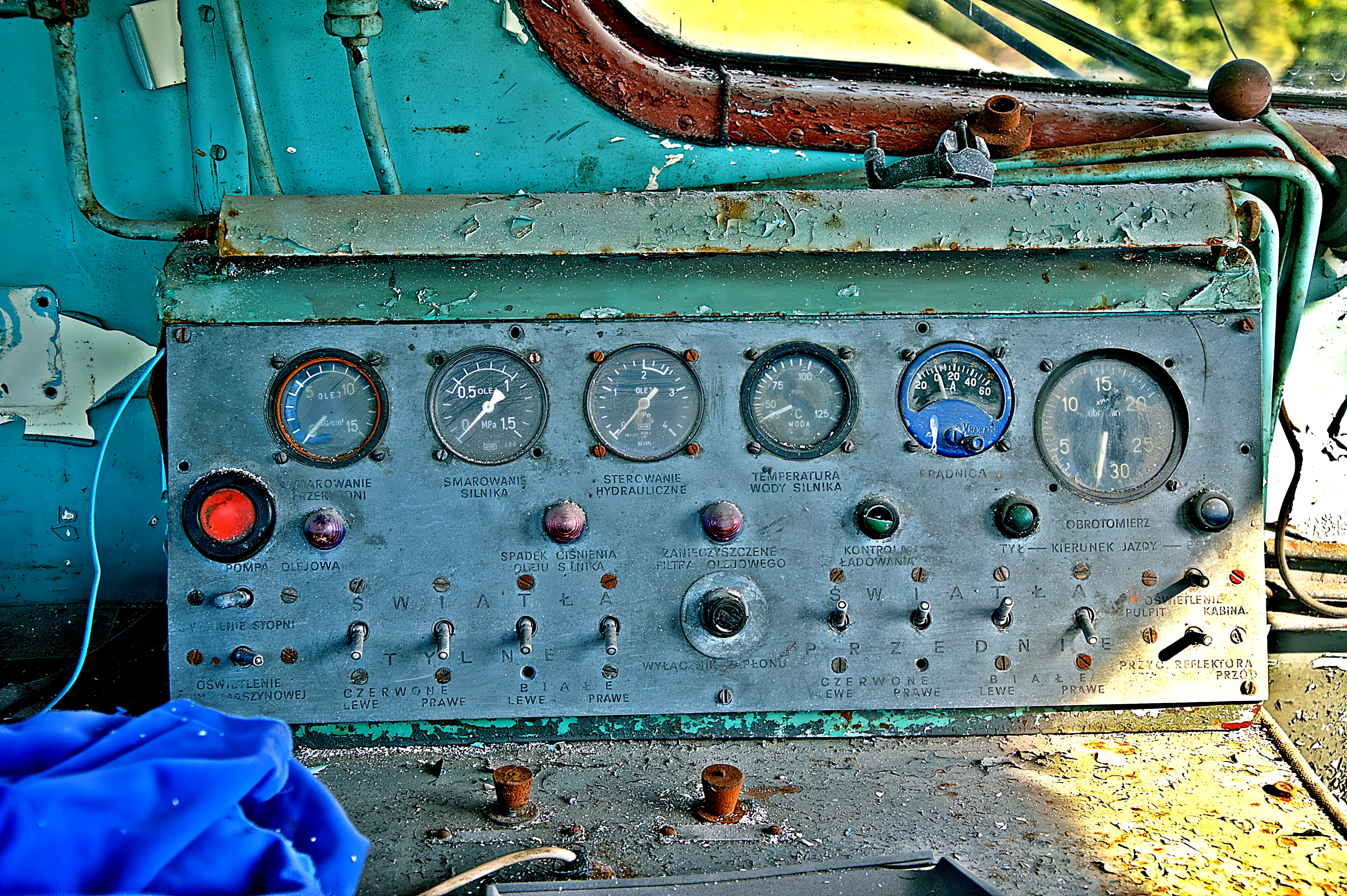
401Da control panel

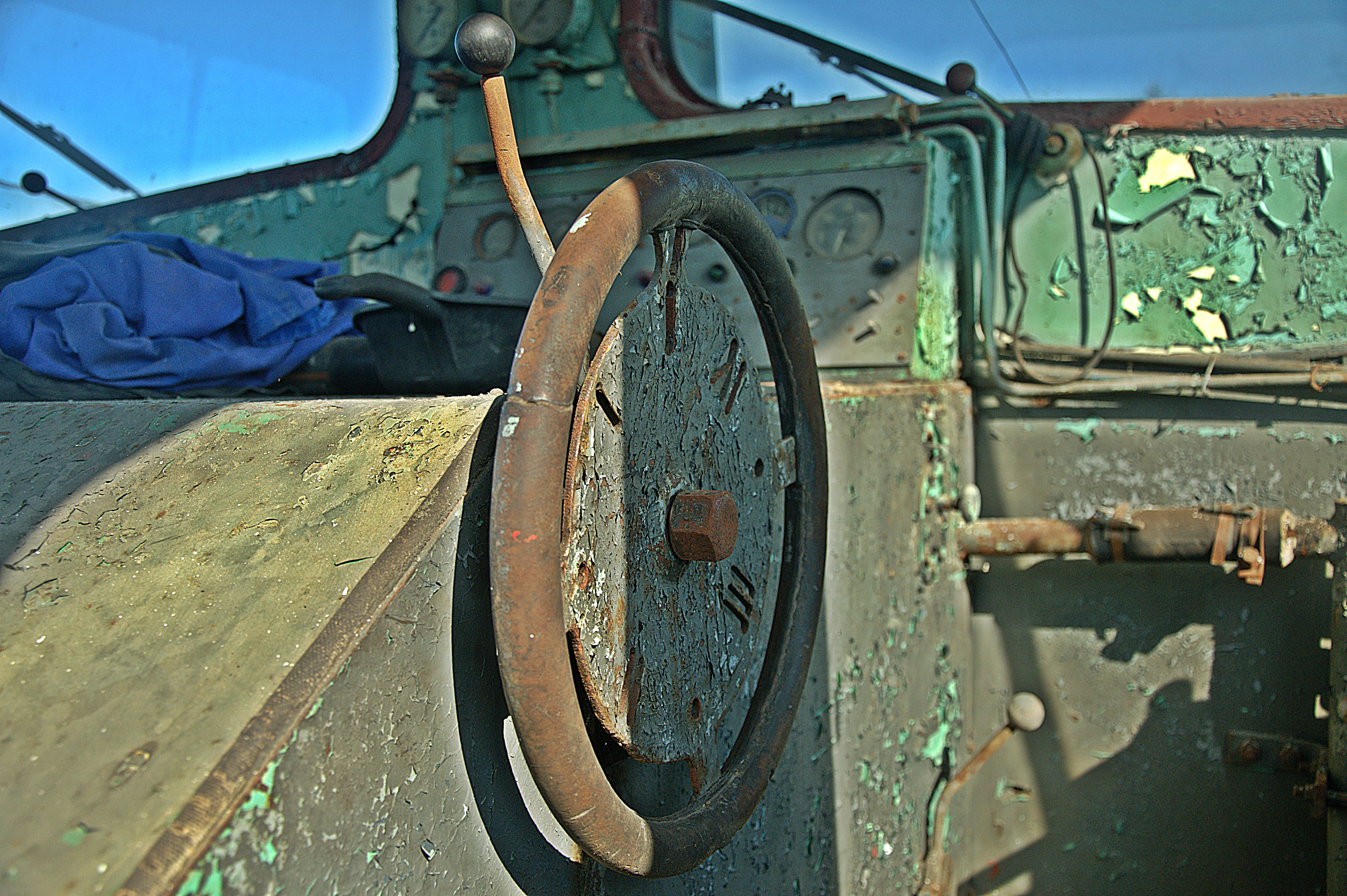
Throttle controller

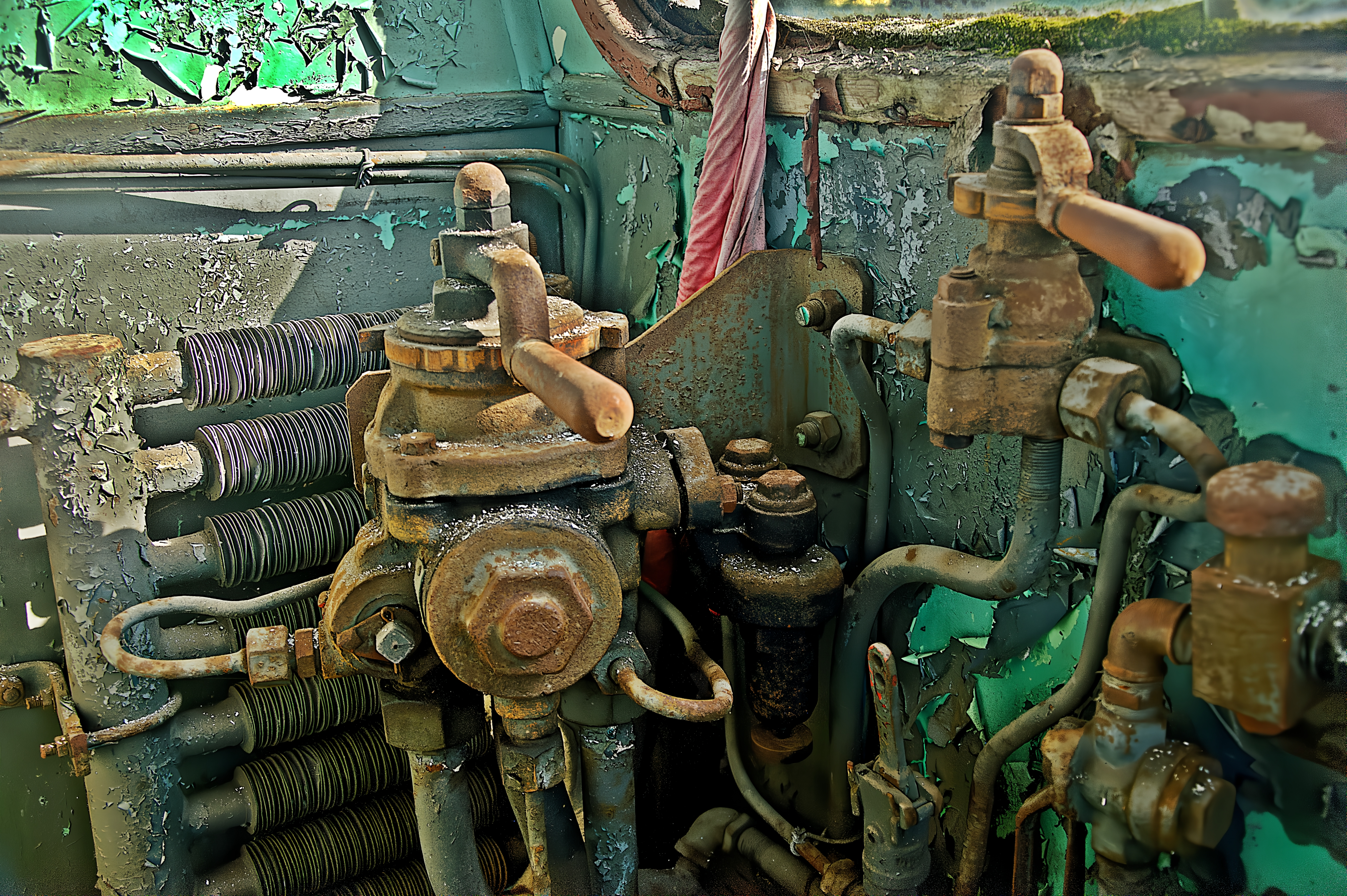
Brake valves

In 1966, Polish State Railways purchased the prototype locomotive 401D-001, designating it as SM31-001. During its trial operation, the locomotive was used as intended, but its design flaws quickly became apparent. The structure was too rigid, causing instability at speeds above 30 km/h and leading to fractures in the vertical hangers of the leaf springs. Due to these issues, Polish State Railways decided against ordering additional locomotives of this type. The only unit was reassigned to track maintenance service, and by the mid-1970s, it was likely sold to the industrial sector.

=== Industrial railways ===
In 1972, locomotive 401Da-022 was delivered to the Groszowice cement plant in Opole. It was operated by the plant until its closure in the late 1990s.

In 1973, the 401Da-069 locomotive was produced. That same year, it was purchased by the Szczecin Shipyard, where it was used for internal transport. In mid-May 2009, the locomotive was leased to the Railway Services Plant in Szczecin.

In the early 1970s, a 401Da-092 diesel locomotive was purchased for the Forging Plants in Ustroń. In the late 1990s, it was transferred to the Skoczów plant.

A 401Da-096 diesel locomotive is operated at the Polifarb plant in Cieszyn.

In the mid-1970s, the then Warsaw Steelworks began gradually replacing steam locomotives with diesel ones. The plant purchased Ls800P diesel locomotives as well as 401Da-128 from 1974, 229 from 1975, 279 from 1976, 380 from 1977, and 418 from 1978, which were used for internal siding operations. After political transformations, the steelworks changed its production profile, and the use of its rolling stock decreased. In 2006, locomotives 401Da-380 and 418 remained in operation at ArcelorMittal Warszawa, serving not only the plant's siding but also the single-track, non-electrified Warszawa Główna Osobowa–Warszawa Szczęśliwice railway connecting Warszawa Jelonki and Radiowo railway stations, as well as handling trains from other operators at Radiowo station. Since the withdrawal of 401Da-418 in 2010, only 401Da-380 remained in use.

In 1975, locomotive 401Da-216 was produced and delivered to the Śrem Iron Foundry. It was later acquired by the Association of Local Railway Transport, and on 1 September 2009, it operated the association's first train on the Czempiń–Śrem route. On 10 August 2013, the same operator reactivated the Kętrzyn–Węgorzewo route, using locomotive 401Da-131.

The first user of 401Da-254, completed in 1975, was the FSC Lublin Automotive Factory. In 2006, the locomotive was transferred to PKP Linia Hutnicza Szerokotorowa, where it was designated SM32-001 and assigned to shunting operations at Sędziszów LHS railway station.

The 401Da-264 diesel locomotive, completed in 1975, was purchased by Ursus SA due to the expansion of the plant's siding and increased wagon traffic. The vehicle was officially listed on 28 November 1975 and was operated by the company until 11 February 1998. After the plant's closure, the locomotive was transferred to the newly formed Energetyka Ursus company, which took over the power plant along with the siding, locomotive depot, and rolling stock. The locomotive was then used for shunting at the power plant siding.

The 401Da-314 locomotive was built in 1976. It belongs to Warsaw Commuter Railway and is used for transporting rolling stock on the non-electrified Pruszków–Komorów railway from Pruszków railway station to Komorów railway station.

The 401Da-337 locomotive from 1976 was delivered to the then Zakłady Naprawcze Taboru Kolejowego in Nowy Sącz. It later operated at the Kujawy Cement Plant in Piechcin, and in 1998, it returned to Zakłady Naprawcze Taboru Kolejowego, where it was designated 401Da-700/28. It was then used for moving locomotives in and out of halls or shifting them between workshops. After 2005, when the company changed its name to Newag, the locomotive was repainted in the company's colors.

The 401Da-427 locomotive, produced in 1978, was delivered to the then Research and Development Center for Rail Vehicles in Poznań, where it was used for shunting within the facility. The current Tabor Railway Vehicle Institute also utilized it in 2008 for testing and research on new rail vehicle solutions.

From 2009 to 2013, the number of operational locomotives remained unchanged at 86.

== Bibliography ==
- Pokropiński, Bogdan (2009). Lokomotywy spalinowe produkcji polskiej [Polish-Made Diesel Locomotives] (in Polish) (1st ed.). Warsaw: Wydawnictwa Komunikacji i Łączności. ISBN 978-83-206-1731-3.
- Mazurczak, Franciszek (1970). "XXV-lecie w budowie lokomotyw" [25th Anniversary of Locomotive Construction]. Biuletyn Informacyjny XXV-lecia Centralnego Biura Konstrukcyjnego Przemysłu Taboru Kolejowego w Poznaniu (in Polish). 2–3. Poznań: Branżowy Ośrodek Informacji Technicznej i Ekonomicznej CBK-PTK Poznań.
