= PKP class SM31 =

SM31
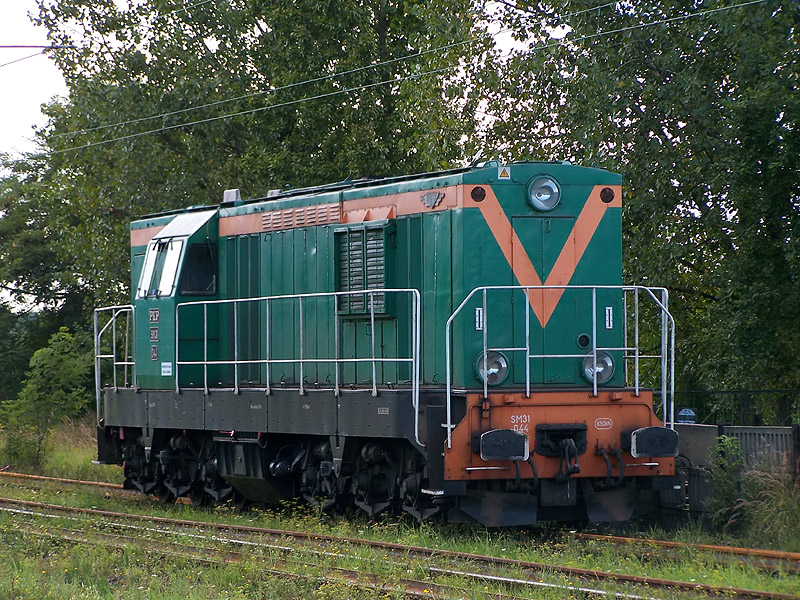
- SM31-044
Type and origin
- Power type: Diesel-electric
- Builder: Fablok
- Model: 411D
- Build date: 1976–1981 & 1983–1985
- Total produced: c. 200
Specifications
- Configuration
  - UIC: Co′Co′
- Gauge: 1,435 mm (4 ft 8 1/2 in)
- Bogies: 2
- Wheel diameter: 1100 mm (3 ft 7 in)
- Length: 17 m (55 ft 9 in)
- Loco weight: 116.4 t (114.6 long tons; 128.3 short tons)
- Fuel type: diesel
- Prime mover: a8C22W
- Engine type: four-stroke
- Cylinders: 8
- Transmission: electrical
- Loco brake: Oerlikon
Performance figures
- Maximum speed: 80 km/h (50 mph)
- Power output: 880 kW (1180 hp)
Career
- Operators: PKP
- Class: SM31
- Number in class: 168
- Nicknames: Trumna
- Delivered: 1976

SM31 (production model 411D) is a Polish series of diesel shunting locomotives used by PKP and industry.

== History ==
The SM31 class was designed for shunting heavy freight trains in large freight stations, works and harbours. The design was elaborated in Fablok in 1973, mainly on the basis of SM42 locomotive. Production of this series lasted between 1976 and 1981, as well as between 1983 and 1985. In this period PKP bought 167 units. About 200 locomotives were produced in total, with the rest of them servicing Polish industry, chiefly mining. The first 2 prototypes (SM31-001 and SM31-002) were sold to industrial works, and PKP's last locomotive was re-bought from an industrial user (SM31-170).

As the main purpose of this series was shunting heavy freight trains, after its introduction PKP possessed shunters suited for all purposes. For extremely light trains mainly SM03 locomotives were used. Medium light trains were shunted by SM30 series, medium weight trains were left for SM42 engines. The last thing to be done was the introduction of heavy shunter able to work in severe climatic conditions, what did not happen before SM48 were brought to Poland.

Today SM31 locomotives are mainly to be found on Upper Silesia railway tracks, pulling heavy freight trains from works to marshalling yards in Łazy, Jaworzno, Szczakowa, Tarnowskie Góry and Rybnik. Other engines are deployed at the stations of Łódź, Nowy Sącz, Poznań, Szczecin and Wrocław.

== Technical data ==
SM31 is a Co-Co locomotive, what means it runs on two bogies, each equipped with three axles. Bogies are similar in construction to those used in SU45 and SU46 locomotives. This gives SM31 locomotive good performance on highland tracks. Being a typical shunter, SM31 has a single crew compartment of the same height as the machine and electric compartments. The engine (V8, compression-ignition) is in fact a developed version of SM42 locomotive engine, with its total power increased by about 50%. The engine drives the main alternator, which powers six 196 kW (263 hp) traction motors.

== Nicknames ==
Trumna (En.: Coffin) – from locomotive's angular shape.
