= PKP class SP30 =

Polish diesel locomotive class

SP30
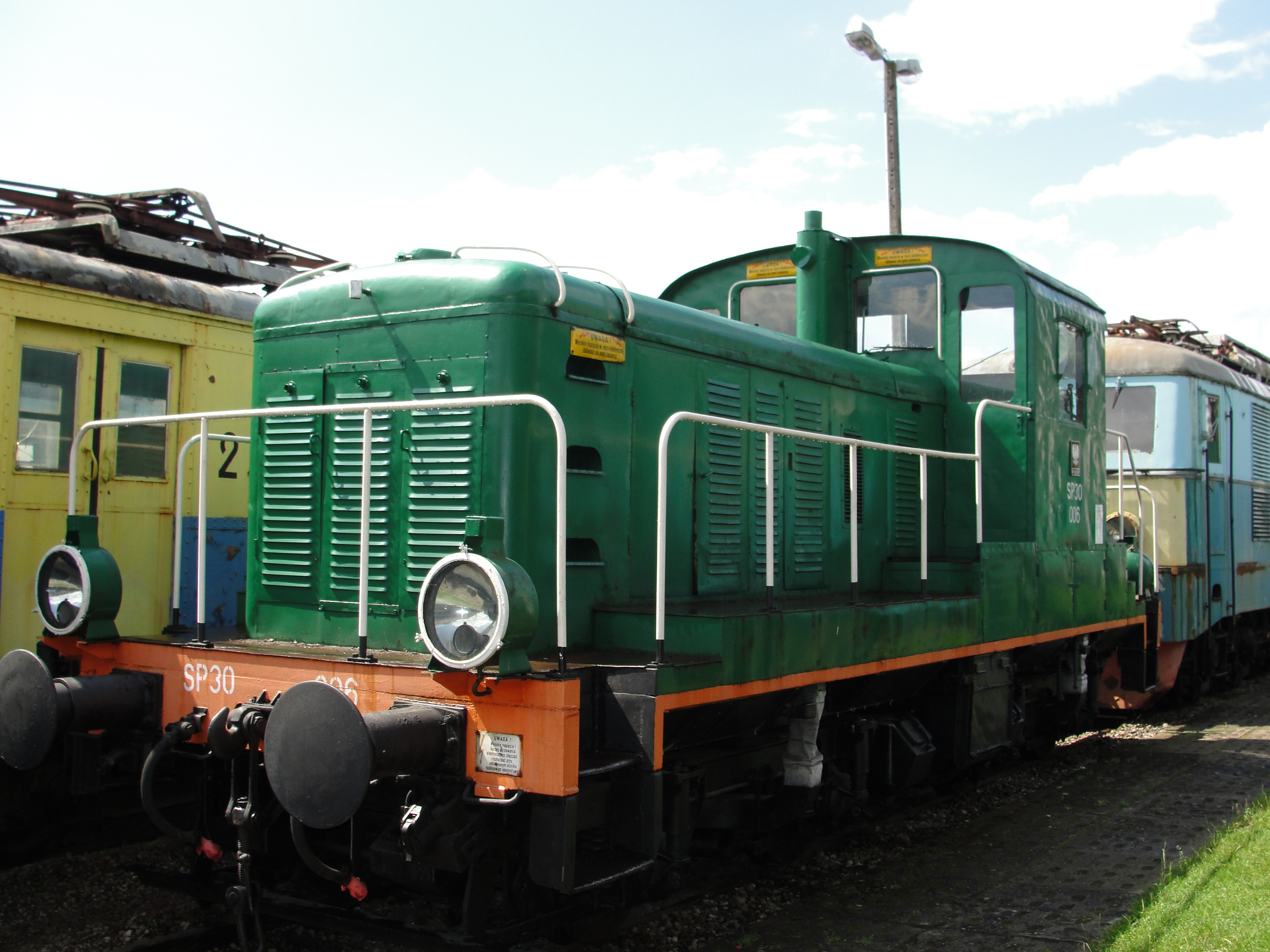
- SP30 locomotive
Type and origin
- Power type: Diesel-electric
- Builder: Fablok / ZNTK Nowy Sącz
- Build date: 1970–1977
- Total produced: 107 converted from SM30
Specifications
- Configuration
  - UIC: Bo′Bo′
- Gauge: 1,435 mm (4 ft 8 1/2 in)
- Wheel diameter: 850 mm (33.5 in)
- Length: 10.140 m (33 ft 3 in)
- Width: 3.130 m (10 ft 3 in)
- Height: 4.300 m (14 ft 1 in)
- Loco weight: 36 tonnes (35 long tons; 40 short tons)
- Fuel type: Diesel
- Fuel capacity: 1,060 litres (230 imp gal; 280 US gal)
- Prime mover: Wola V-300; Wola 2DVSa-350
- Engine type: 4diesel
- Traction motors: LT-31; LKAa-310
- Cylinders: 12
- Transmission: Electric
- Loco brake: Knorr-Bremse, hand brake
Performance figures
- Maximum speed: 60 km/h (37 mph)
- Power output: 220 kW (300 hp); 257 kW (345 hp)
- Tractive effort: 73.55 kN (16,530 lbf)
Career
- Operators: PKP
- Class: SP30
- Number in class: 107
- Delivered: 1970
- Retired: about 2000
- Disposition: converted back to SM30

SP30 is a Polish series of diesel passenger locomotives used by PKP.

== History ==
In the 1970s 107 items of SM30 class locomotives were modified to heat old passenger wagons, which were modernized with 500V electric heaters, and as a result their designation was changed to SP30 (meaning a diesel locomotive able to pull passenger trains). A prototype locomotive, SM30-232 was converted in 1970. Then, in 1974-1977, 106 locomotives were converted this way by the ZNTK Nowy Sącz (of those, 75 in 1974). They retained their original SM30 class numbers. Those machines remained in regular service until the late 1980s. Because of a withdrawal of old wagons, in 2000 all of them were again, after dismounting heating systems, returned to SM30 series. A similar modification was applied to SM42 class, resulting in the SU42 class.

== Technical data ==
SP30 is a Bo′Bo′ locomotive, what means it runs on two bogies, each equipped with two axles. The general construction of this engine is relatively simple.

The locomotive frame is constructed of steel rolled formers. Ball stub-axles are mounted to strend girders, that make welded box construction. Power unit, composed of a diesel engine and main alternator, is mounted on parallel girders. The engine is connected to main alternator with an elastic clutch. Four traction motors (two on each bogie) are mounted with a tram system. Traction motors can be powered in series connection, parallel connection and parallel connection with field reduction of 40 to 60%.

Traction motors are series devices with 60 kW hour power. Main alternator (PABOM-186a type) is a DC machine with 600 V and 367 A. Its power rating whilst working with 1500 rpm. is 220 kW. During engine starting the main alternator serves as electric starter, powered from the battery. For the purposes of enlighting the locomotive and charging batteries an additional alternator (Pw-114a type) is used.

The only difference between SM30 and SP30 classes is a device to provide wagons with power from the main alternator. This device allowed the locomotive to heat up to three two-axled carriages.
