= PKP class SM03 =

Polish diesel locomotive class

PKP SM03
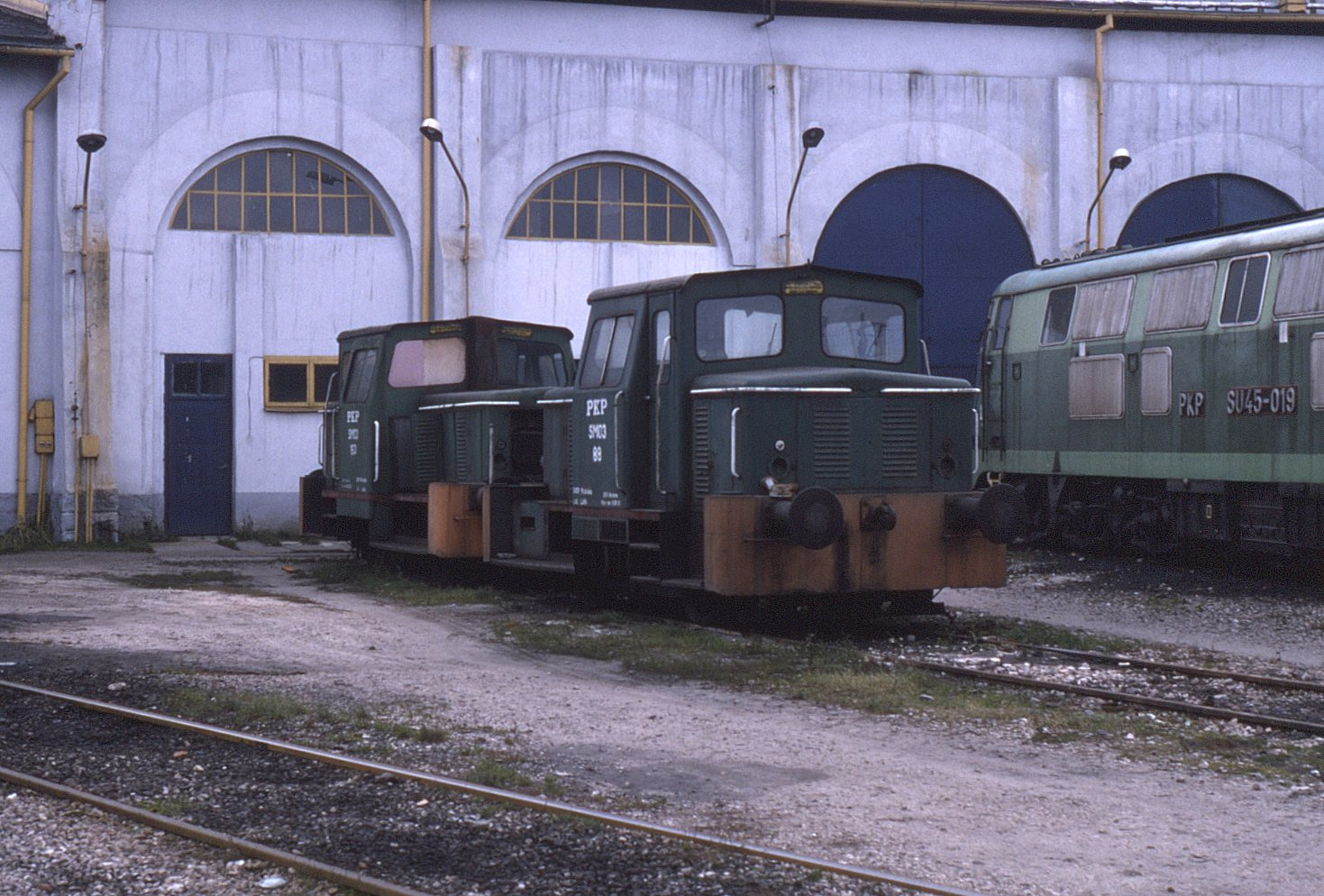
Type and origin
- Power type: Diesel-mechanical
- Builder: Fablok; Zastal
- Model: Ls150; 2Ls150
- Build date: 1959–1966
- Total produced: 273
Specifications
- Configuration
  - UIC: B
- Gauge: 1,435 mm (4 ft 8 1/2 in)
- Driver dia.: 950 mm (3 ft 1 3/8 in)
- Length: 6,940 mm (22 ft 9 1/4 in)
- Width: 2,970 mm (9 ft 9 in)
- Height: 3,380 mm (11 ft 1 in)
- Loco weight: 24 tonnes (23.6 long tons; 26.5 short tons)
- Fuel capacity: 250 litres (55 imp gal; 66 US gal)
- Prime mover: DSR150
- Cylinders: 6
- Transmission: Mechanical
- Loco brake: Knorr
Performance figures
- Maximum speed: Ls150: 25.7 km/h (16.0 mph); 2Ls150: 45.8 km/h (28.5 mph)
- Power output: 110 kW (150 hp)
- Tractive effort: 58.5 kN (13,200 lbf)
Career
- Operators: PKP
- Class: SM03
- Nicknames: Kogucik; Kaczka
- Locale: Poland
- Delivered: 1959

SM03 is the name of a Polish diesel locomotive class in the PKP railway operator designation. The letters SM describe a diesel shunting locomotive.

== Technical data ==
It is a small 110-kilowatt (150 hp) shunting locomotive with mechanical transmission. Power from the engine is transmitted to wheel sets through the main clutch and quadruple gearbox.

=== Engine ===
The SM03 is powered by a fourstroke, six-cylinder diesel engine 2DSR 150 with automatic ignition and rated power of 150 hp at 1500 rpm. The engine is started by an electric starter, powered from 300 Ah acid batteries.

=== Gearbox ===
Locomotives of this series were built with two types of gearbox: first 1P154 had a one-speed range (factory designation: Ls150), and the other a quadruple gearbox 1P154/2 with two-speed ranges (factory designation: 2Ls150). Accordingly, the former had a maximal speed of 25.7 km/h, and the letter was capable of 45.8 km/h. Gearbox steering is of mechanical-hydraulic type, while fuel dosing and motion direction change are mechanical.

=== Brakes ===
The locomotive is equipped with Westinghouse type air brakes, additional non-automatic Knorr type brakes, and hand screw brakes. Wheel sets are stopped one-sided by cast iron blocks.

=== Body ===
The locomotive has a chassis with two axles and welded frame. Bushing bumpers, screw and air couplings are mounted to the front and back of the frame. The body of the locomotive is composed of two engine compartments (front and back) and the elevated engineer compartment in between. The compartments are welded. Engine compartments have doors on all sides, providing convenient access to all the systems inside. The engineer compartment has large front, back and side windows with hand-powered wipers. In cold weather it is heated with fluid from the engine cooling system flowing through two radiators

=== Equipment ===
The SM03 is fitted with an air-propelled sound horn, sanding device and two fire extinguishers. The electrical system (24 V) is powered from the alternator installed on the engine or from batteries.

== History ==
The SM03 was designed in 1958 by CBKPTK (Central Design Bureau of Railway Stock Industry) in Poznań. Its purpose was servicing locomotive parks and small and medium-sized stations, and industrial service. Apart from PKP, this locomotive type was widely used in industry and storage.

=== Introduction ===
Serial production was placed in national works Fablok in Chrzanów. The first item was produced in 1959. From 1965 this loco was also produced at Zaodrzańskie Zakłady Przemysłu Metalowego Zastal in Zielona Góra. The 2Ls150 variety was produced only for PKP as a shunting-line type.

=== Production ===
Locomotives numbers	Producer	Years of production	Quantity
01 – 229	Fablok	1959–1967	229
230 – 269	Zastal	1968–1969	40
270, 316, 539, 645	Fablok	1960–1966	4

=== Present day ===
A few locomotives of this class are still in operation at PKP. Many had been taken out of service and can be seen abandoned on sidetracks.

== Nicknames ==
- Kogucik (en: Little rooster) - from its size.
- Kaczka (en: The duck) - from its size and look.

== See also ==
- Polish locomotives designation
