= PKP class SM30 =

Polish diesel locomotive class

SM30
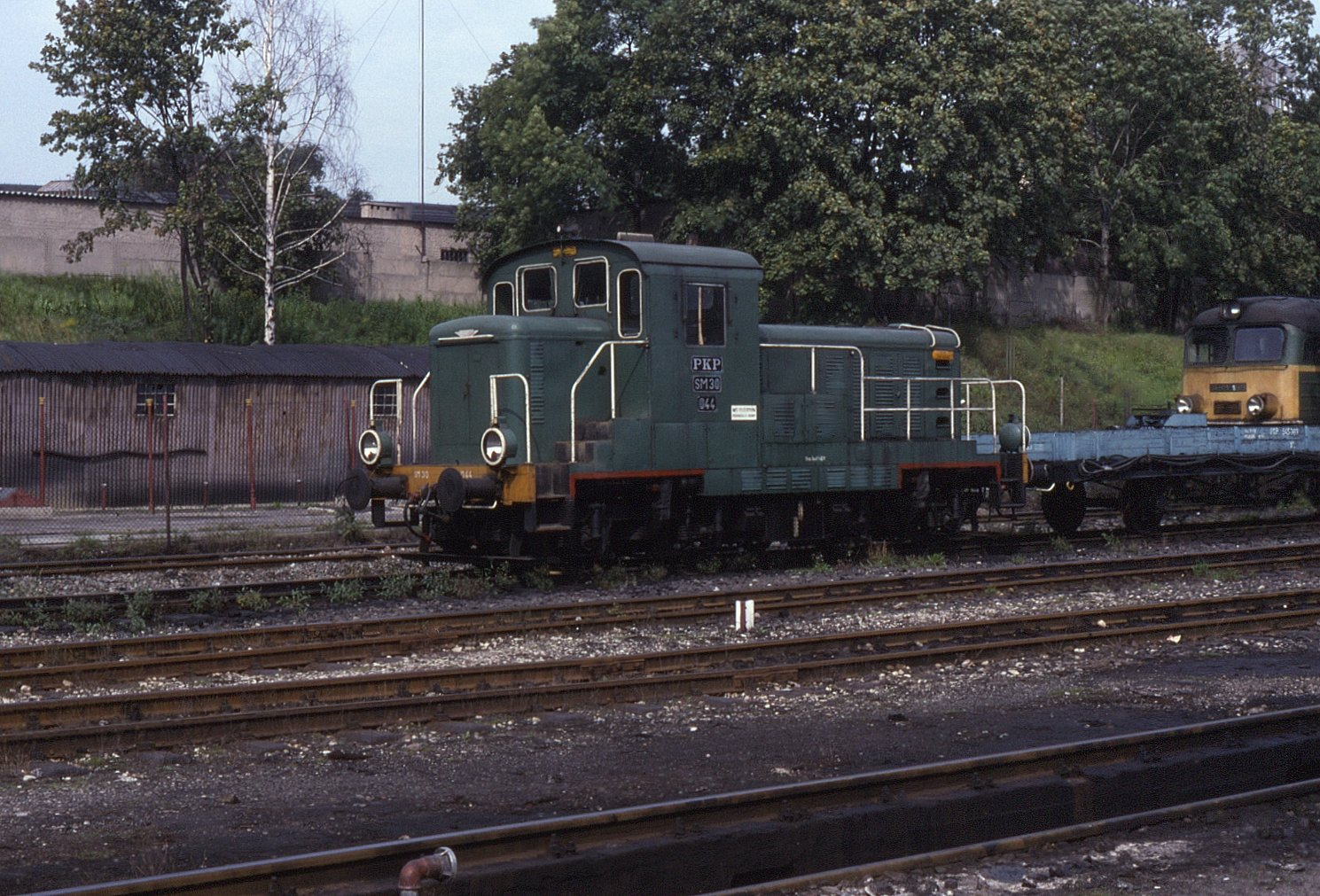
- Class SM30 locomotives
Type and origin
- Power type: Diesel-electric
- Builder: Fablok Chrzanów
- Model: Ls300E
- Build date: 1957–1970
- Total produced: 909
Specifications
- Configuration
  - UIC: Bo′Bo′
- Gauge: 1,435 mm (4 ft 8 1/2 in) standard gauge
- Wheel diameter: 850 mm (33.46 in)
- Length: 10,140 mm (33 ft 3 in)
- Width: 3,130 mm (10 ft 3 in)
- Height: 4,300 mm (14 ft 1 in)
- Loco weight: 36 t (35 long tons; 40 short tons)
- Fuel capacity: 1,060 L (230 imp gal; 280 US gal)
- Prime mover: Wola V-300; Wola 2DVSa-350
- Engine type: Four-stroke diesel engine
- Traction motors: LT-31; LKAa-310
- Cylinders: 12
- Loco brake: Knorr-Bremse hand brake
Performance figures
- Maximum speed: 60 km/h (37 mph)
- Power output: 220 kW (300 hp); 257 kW (340 hp)
- Tractive effort: 73.55 kN (16,530 lbf)
Career
- Operators: PKP
- Class: SM30
- Number in class: 302

SM30 is a Polish series of diesel shunting locomotives used by PKP and industry, built by Fablok, Chrzanów (factory designation Ls300E). They were also used for a local traffic.

== History ==
SM30 locomotive is the first Polish diesel locomotive equipped with electrical transmission. A design was worked out by the Central Rolling Stock Industry Construction Bureau in Poznań. The prototype was constructed in Fablok, Chrzanów in 1957. 909 items were built in 1957-1970, 302 of them found place in PKP, the rest worked in the industry (with designations Ls300 or SM30). The locomotive was also known under its project designation 1D or early PKP designation Lwe55 (until 1960).

In the 1970s, 109 items of SM30 locomotive were modified for heating passenger wagons with 500 V electric heaters, and as a result their class designation was changed to SP30 (able to pull passenger trains). Those machines remained in regular service until the late 1980s. In 2000 all of them were again, after dismounting heating systems, returned to SM30 series.

== Technical data ==
SM30 is a Bo′Bo′ locomotive, what means it runs on two bogies, each equipped with two axles. The general construction of this engine is relatively simple. Being the pioneer machine in the Polish railway industry, it incorporated many solutions from other branches of industry, i.e. the first engine to be mounted, Wola V-300, was taken from tank construction, main DC current generator was in fact stationery generator and traction motors were taken from trams. As the first Polish locomotive with diesel-electric transmission it proved the high efficiency of that solution and was quite successful.

The locomotive frame is constructed of steel rolled formers. Ball stub-axles are mounted to strend girders, that make welded box construction. A power unit, composed of a diesel engine and main generator, is mounted on parallel girders. The engine is connected to main generator with an elastic clutch. Four traction motors (two on each bogie) are mounted with a tram system. Traction motors can be powered in series connection, parallel connection and parallel connection with field reduction of 40 to 60%.

Traction motors are series devices with 60 kW (80 hp) hour power. Main generator (PABOM-186a type) is a DC machine with 600 V and 367 A. Its power rating whilst working with 1500 rpm. is 220 kW (300 hp). During engine starting the main generator serves as electric starter, powered from the battery. For the purposes of lighting the locomotive and charging batteries an additional generator (Pw-114a type) is used.

SM30 locomotives had two types of diesel engine mounted. Wola V-300 and 2DVSa-350 (from 1962) 12-cylinder engines had powers, respectively: 300 and 350 hp (220 and 260 kW). Neutral gear rotation is 600 rpm. and rated rev is 1500 rpm.
