= PKP class EN81 =

Electric motor coach produced by the Pesa

EN81
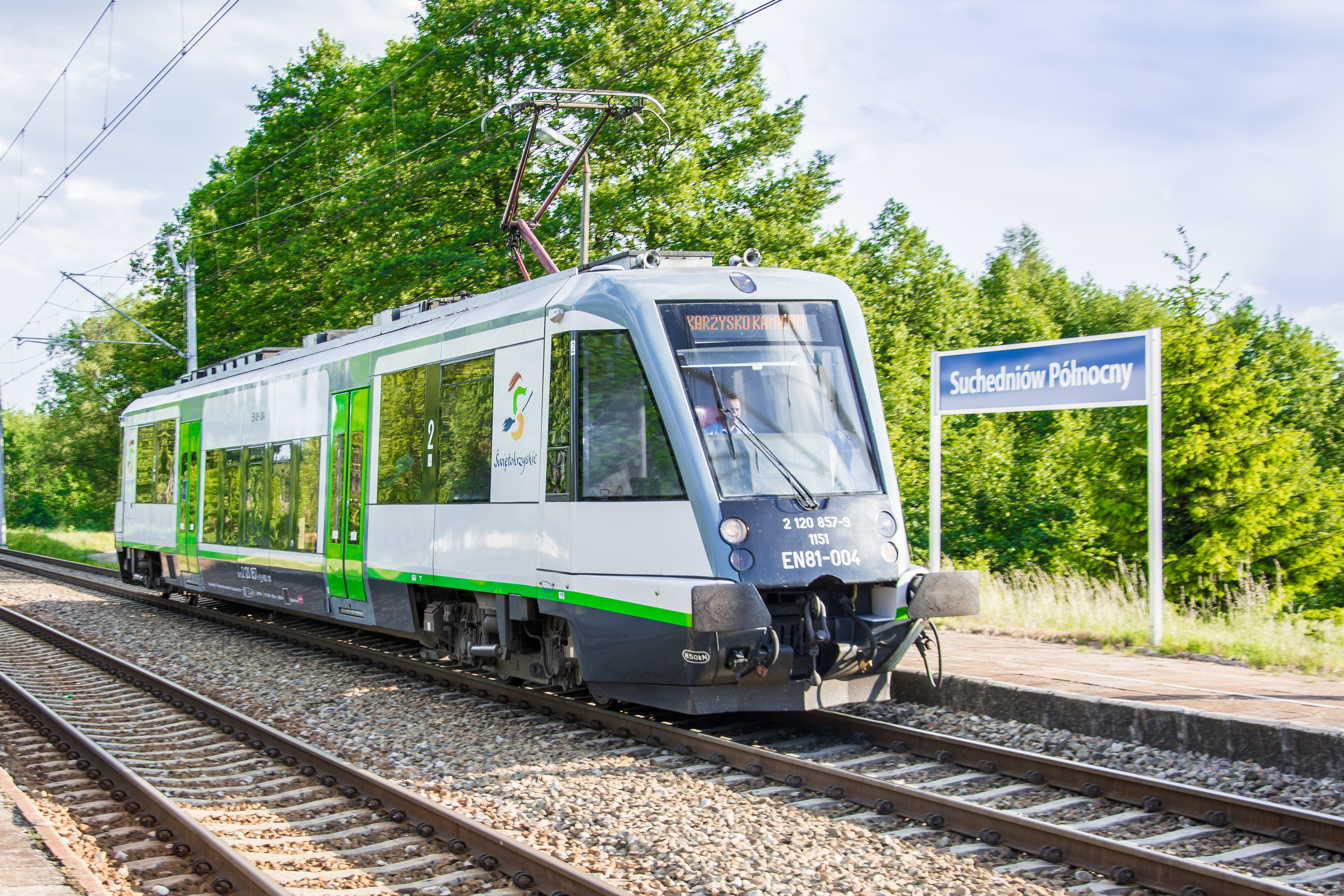
- Stock type: electric multiple unit
- Manufacturer: Pesa
- Assembly: Bydgoszcz, Poland
- Constructed: 2005–2007
- Number built: 8
- Capacity: 140

Specifications
- Train length: 26,530 mm (1,044 in)
- Width: 2,830 mm (111 in)
- Height: 4,010 mm (158 in)
- Floor height: 800 mm (31 in)
- Wheel diameter: 840 mm (33 in)
- Maximum speed: 120 km/h (75 mph)
- Weight: 53 t (117,000 lb)
- Engine type: DKLBZ0910-4A
- Acceleration: 0.6–0.8 m/s²
- Electric system: 3kv cc
- Braking system: disc brakes + ED braking

EN81 (manufacturer's designation: Pesa 308B) is an electric motor coach produced by the Pesa plant in Bydgoszcz in 2005 and 2007. A total of 8 units were built, currently operated by Polregio in the Świętokrzyskie Voivodeship, and previously also in the Lesser Poland Voivodeship. The EN81 is intended for use on electrified regional routes to service routes with a small number of passengers, where operating multi-car electric multiple units would be uneconomical.

== Origins ==
The declining local train traffic in the 1990s led to the need for reducing train sizes. However, there was a lack of small electric vehicles that could replace the large and power-hungry EN57 units. Around Kraków, this issue was temporarily addressed by operating diesel railbuses on electrified local lines. However, this was not an ideal solution, as it increased operating costs, with the cost of providing transport using electric rolling stock being from 3 to 5 times lower than with equivalent diesel vehicles. Additionally, PKP Polskie Linie Kolejowe charged fees for the use of tracks and electric traction infrastructure, even though diesel vehicles did not use the electric system. Furthermore, the country's energy security was a factor – diesel fuel is almost entirely imported, while electricity is produced domestically. The highest demand for such vehicles was in the Lesser Poland Voivodeship, where plans were being made to electrify the line connecting the city center with the Kraków John Paul II International Airport, and in the Świętokrzyskie Voivodeship.

Following significant restructuring in 1998, Pesa initially (from 2001) focused on producing diesel railcars from the 214M family for regional authorities. In 2004, it took on the challenge of building its first electric multiple unit for Warsaw Commuter Railway – the EN95. Based on the experience and solutions gained from these projects, in 2005, Pesa attempted to build the first Polish electric motor coach (the EN80, operated by the Warsaw Commuter Railway from 1927 to 1972, had been produced by the British company English Electric).

== Construction ==
The EN81 is a single-unit, single-space train designed for regional passenger services on less heavily trafficked, electrified lines powered by 3 kV DC. The design incorporates some concepts proven during the production of the EN95 electric multiple unit, such as the front end and the lowered floor between the bogies, as well as elements from the 214M family of diesel railcars, like the bogies and seats.

The vehicles have two pairs of double-leaf, sliding-plug doors on both sides (with a clearance of 1.300 mm). Each door is equipped with a retractable step to aid boarding at platforms lower than 800 mm above the track, the level at which the medium-floor area is located, where all the doors are positioned. The doors are located near steps leading to higher floor levels.

Like the 214M diesel railcars, the vehicle is mounted on two two-axle bogies: a powered bogie (22MNa) and a trailer bogie (22MNb). The bogies are fitted with disc brakes, though they are not used for primary braking. Above all bogies, there are areas with raised floors (1,290 mm above the track), accessed by two steps, while between the entrance vestibules is a low-floor area (600 mm above the track), accessed by one step on one side and a ramp on the other.

Buffers and chain couplers are used, allowing up to three vehicles to be coupled in multiple traction or the towing of a passenger railroad car.

The vehicle is fitted with 60 fixed seats, identical to those in the 214M family. In the low-floor section, in the middle of the vehicle, there is a closed-system toilet and two spaces for wheelchairs next to the ramp leading to the medium-floor area. The vehicle also features a visual information system, monitoring, and air conditioning.

Identical driver’s cabs are located at both ends of the vehicle, separated from the passenger compartment by glass doors. Each cab has one seat. Inside, there are control consoles for operating displays and a microphone.

The EN81 is powered by two asynchronous motors (type DKLBZ0910-4A, produced by VEM Sachsenwerk) through SZH 495 traction gearboxes (produced by Voith). Each motor is powered by one transistor inverter (type FT-300-3000, produced by Medcom). This drive system allows acceleration of 0.65 m/s² (up to 25 km/h) and a maximum speed of 130 km/h. Power is supplied to the high-voltage circuit through a single-arm current collector (type DSA200-PKP, produced by Stemmann). The current collector is mounted above the trailer bogie, while the high-voltage cabinet is installed near cab A (on the opposite side of the vehicle).

=== Modifications ===
During their operation in Świętokrzyskie Voivodeship, the vehicles underwent modifications, including the replacement of compressors, seats, and air conditioning (with a more efficient system).

== Operation ==
Owner	Carrier	Numbers	Years of operation	Quantity	Source
Lesser Poland Voivodeship	Polregio (Lesser Poland branch)	001–002	2005–2014	2	
mLeasing	Polregio (Lesser Poland branch)	005–008	2006–2016	4	
Świętokrzyskie Voivodeship	Polregio (Świętokrzyskie branch)	003–004	since 2005	2	

=== Lesser Poland ===
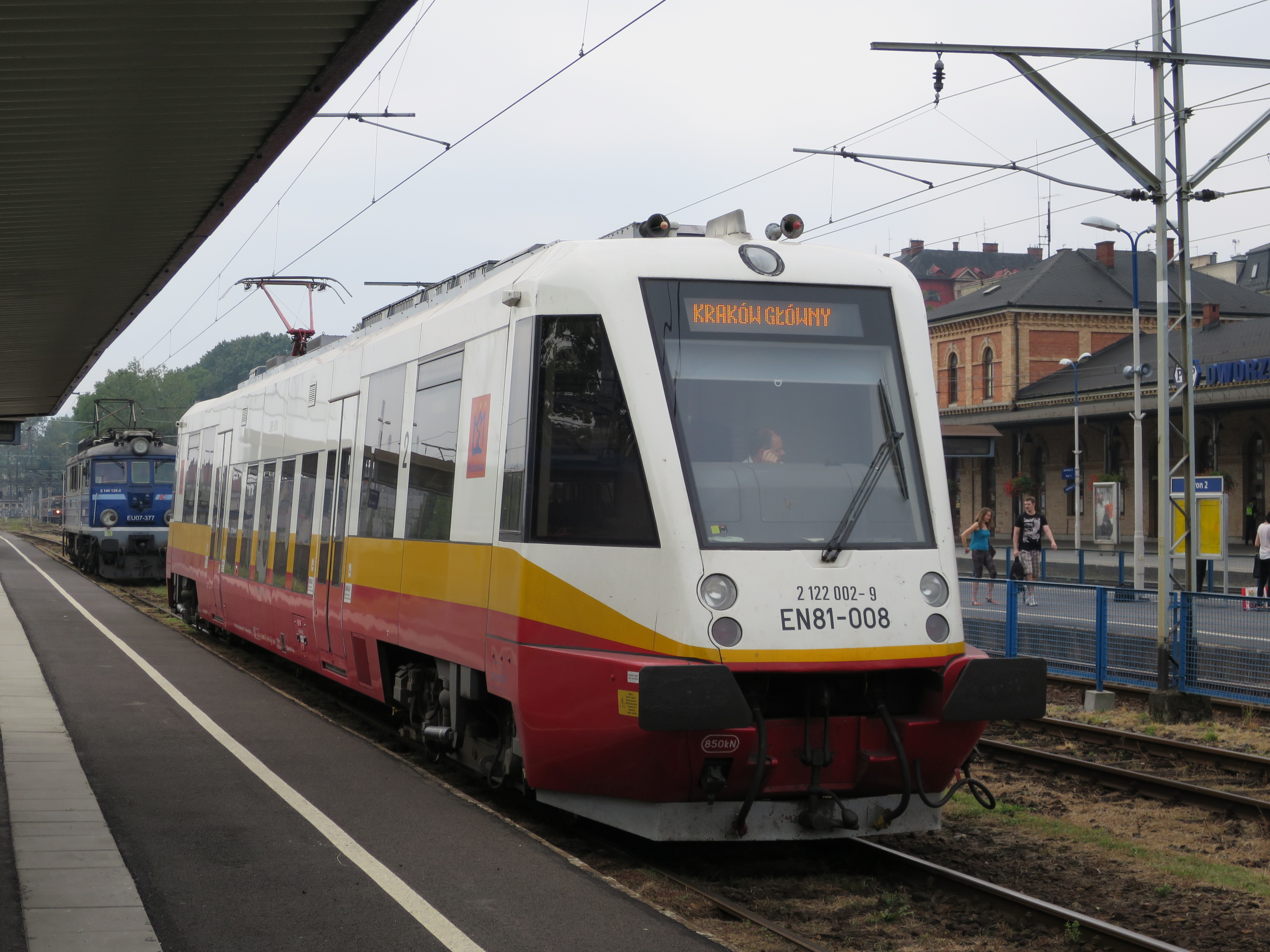
Lesser Poland's EN81

On 30 December 2004, the Lesser Poland Voivodeship signed a contract with Pesa for the delivery of two EN81 units for Polregio. These units were officially presented at Kraków Główny railway station on 30 September 2005. The trains were designated for services on the Krzeszowice–Kraków–Wieliczka and Krzeszowice–Kraków–Skawina routes. However, the vehicles were purchased with the intention of future electrification of the line to the airport and for servicing the Kraków Główny–Kraków Lotnisko railway line.

Even before the purchase of the first EN81 units, Polregio operated small diesel multiple units: SA101, SA104, and two SA109 units, which were quite prone to failure. The EN81 units also turned out to be highly unreliable, with the electrical system, particularly the inverters, causing the most problems.

In October 2005, EN81-001 was loaned by the manufacturer for the Trako fair in Gdańsk.

On 6 July 2006, the Lesser Poland Voivodeship signed a 10-year leasing agreement with a consortium of Pesa and BRE Leasing (now mLeasing) for four more EN81 units along with two SA133 diesel units. This agreement included an option to purchase the vehicles at the end of the leasing period. The first EN81 and the first SA133 were delivered on 21 February 2007. These vehicles were also rented to service the Kraków railway junction, allowing the problematic SA109 units to be relocated to the Sucha Beskidzka–Żywiec line.

In 2016, after the leasing period ended, the voivodeship management decided not to purchase the leased EN81 units. The remaining two EN81 units owned by the voivodeship were then stored in Sucha Beskidzka due to the lack of a P4 repair, and the voivodeship intended to sell them. These two units had not been operated since 2014 and were put up for sale in October 2020. As a result, in January 2021, both units were acquired by the Piotr Mieczkowski Rolling Stock Service.

=== Świętokrzyskie ===
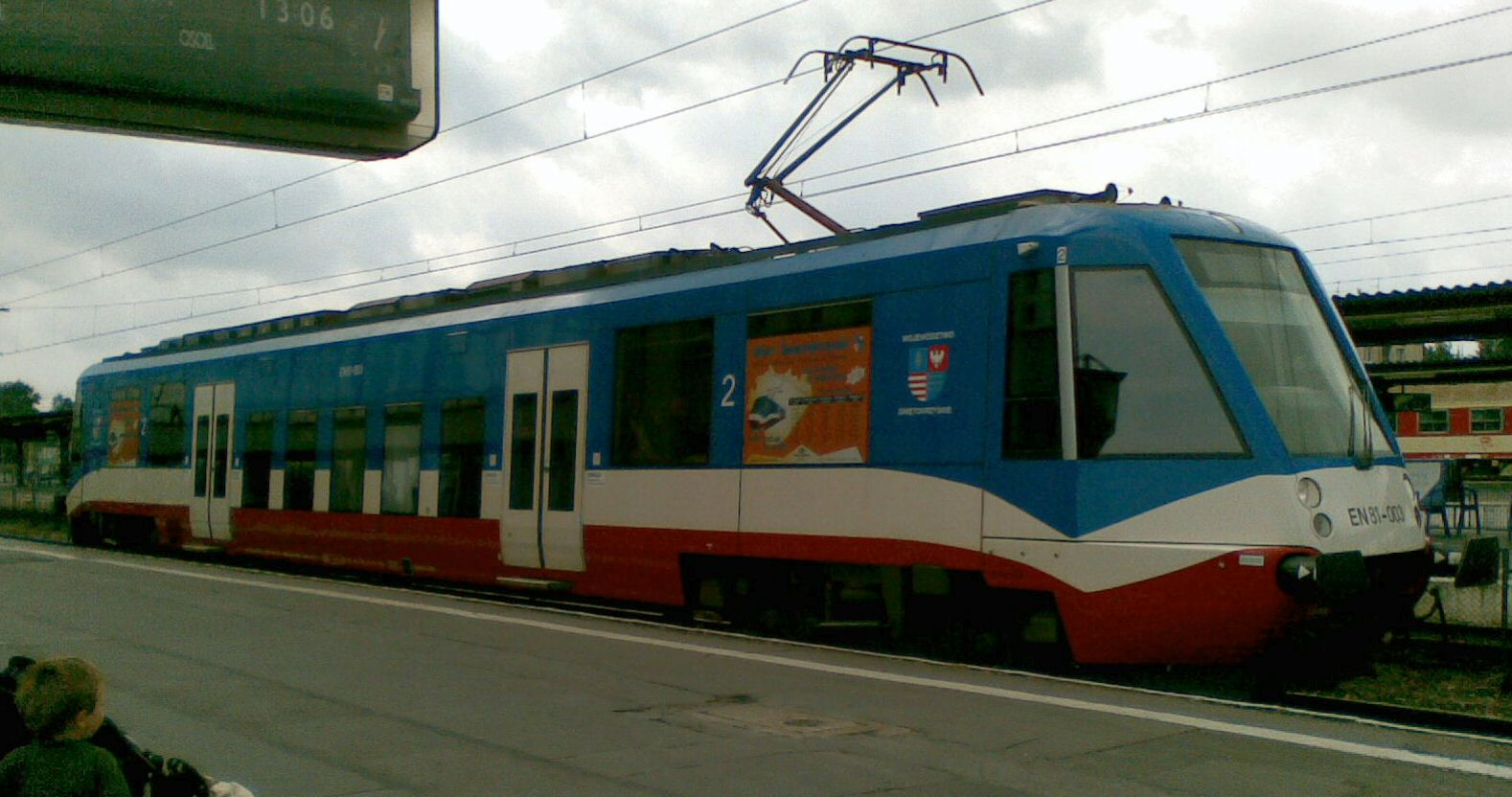
Świętokrzyskie's EN81 in original livery

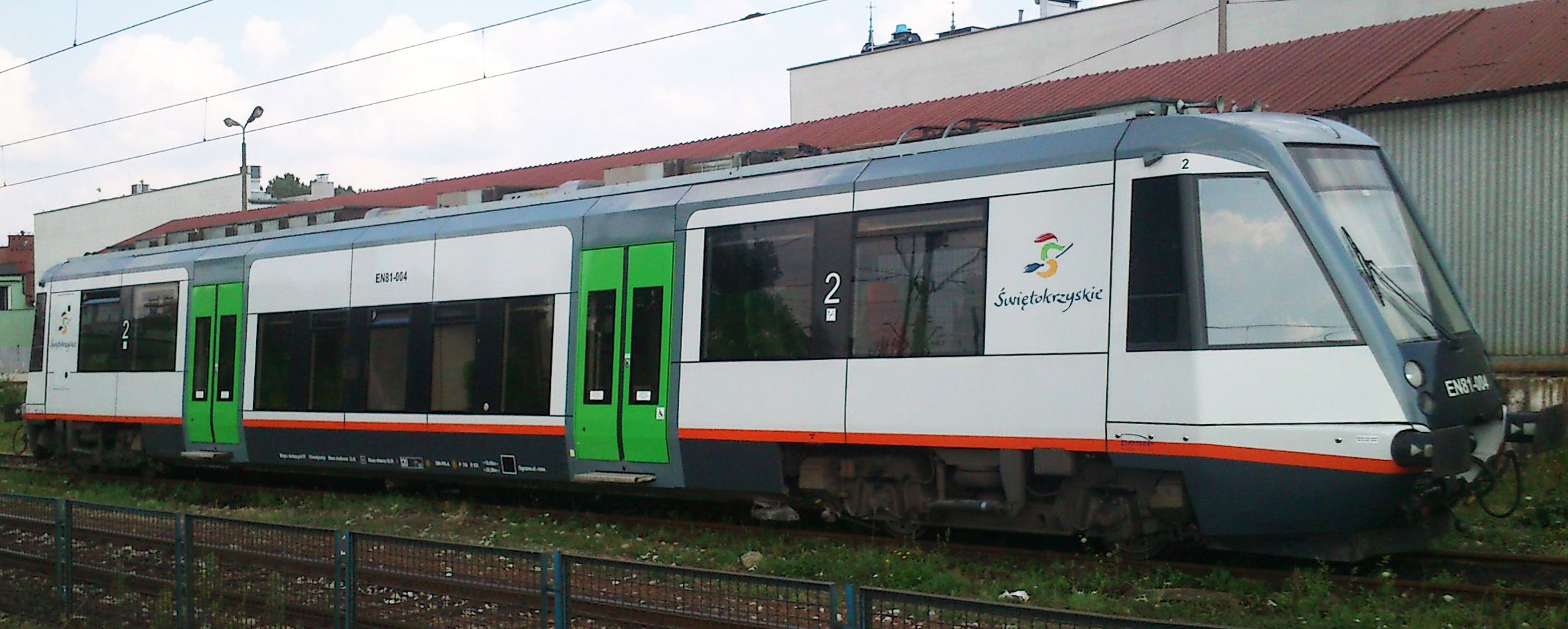
Świętokrzyskie's EN81 in new livery

On 25 October 2005, two units were transferred to Polregio, and their official presentation took place on November 2 at the Kielce railway station.

The trains were assigned to operate the Skarżysko-Kamienna–Ostrowiec Świętokrzyski and Skarżysko-Kamienna–Kielce–Sędziszów routes. The EN81 units were the first trains purchased by the Świętokrzyskie Voivodeship. Later, the voivodeship acquired additional low-capacity electric trains – four two-car Elf units.

During the initial period of operation, the trains experienced many minor faults: during sudden voltage spikes, the vehicles would stop, current collectors would fail, and automatically deployed steps would malfunction. On 8 August 2006, one of the units had an electrical fire.

=== Silesia ===
At the end of August 2017, Pesa transferred two EN81 units to Silesian Railways due to delays in the delivery of Elf II vehicles.

== Awards and distinctions ==
- 2005 – main award from the National Board of the Association of Engineers and Technicians of Communication at the Trako fair in Oliwa.
- 2005 – medal from the President of the Association of Polish Electricians at the Trako fair in Oliwa.

== Naming issues ==
The EN81 is incorrectly referred to as an electric multiple unit by the manufacturer, as it consists of only a single car. In industry publications, it is also referred to as an electric railbus or electric multiple unit; however, these are colloquial terms. According to Polish State Railways designations, it is classified as a self-propelled motor car for any type of power supply, meaning it is an electric self-propelled motor car in this case.
