= Pesa 218M =

Family of diesel multiple units produced by Pesa

SA131-SA134
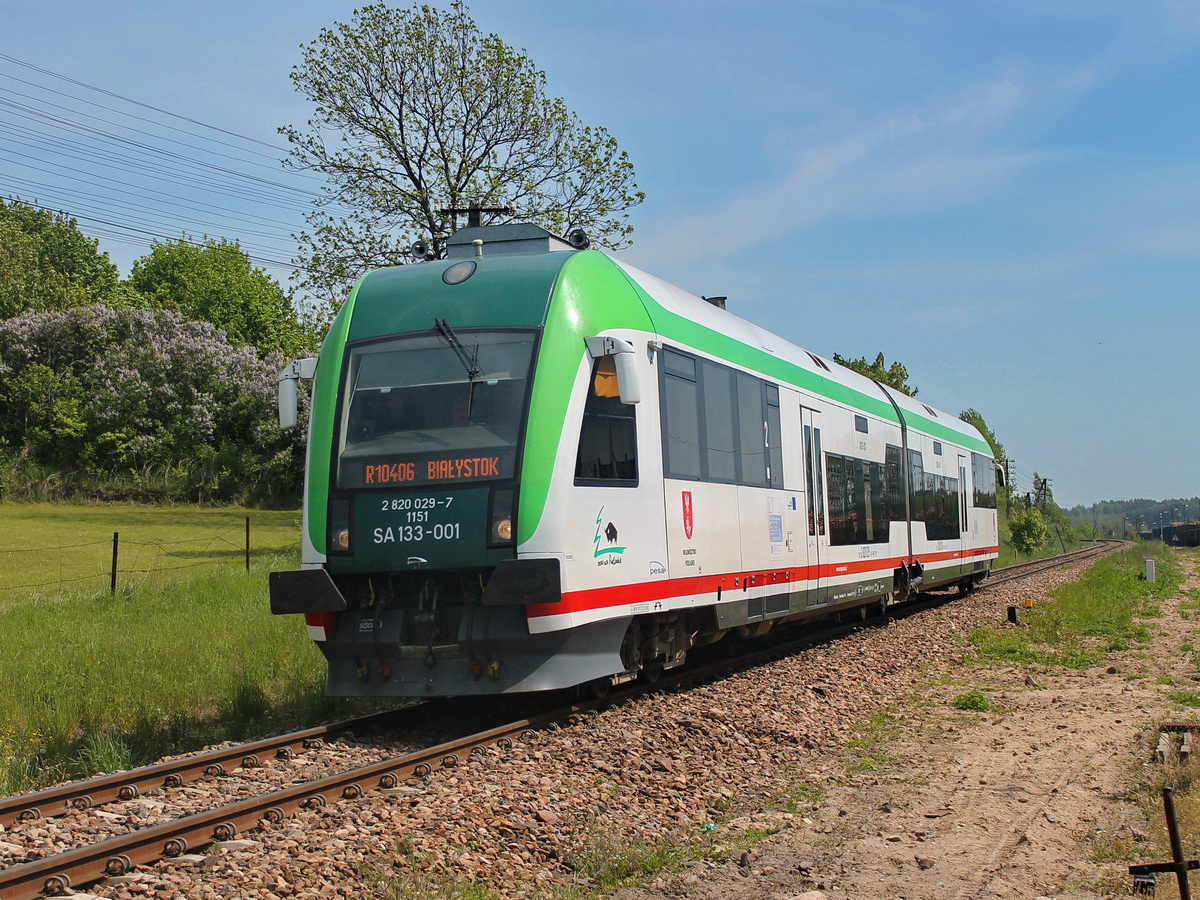
- Stock type: diesel multiple unit
- Manufacturer: Pesa
- Assembly: Poland
- Constructed: 2005–2015
- Number built: 76
- Capacity: up to 300
- Operator: Lower Silesian Railways Others

Specifications
- Train length: 41,700 mm (1,640 in)
- Width: 2,890 mm (114 in)
- Height: 4,135 mm (162.8 in)
- Platform height: 600 mm (24 in)
- Wheel diameter: 840 mm (33 in) (new) 780 mm (31 in) (worn)
- Maximum speed: 120 km/h (75 mph) or 130 km/h (81 mph)
- Engine type: diesel engine
- Braking system: SAB-Wabco + retarder

Pesa 218M is a family of two-car standard-gauge diesel multiple units (DMUs) produced by Pesa between 2005 and 2015. Only one single-engine unit of the original 218M model was built, while the remaining dual-engine units were designated as subtypes 218Ma-218Md. A total of 76 units were produced, which are operated by Arriva (6 units), Lower Silesian Railways (9 units), Greater Poland Railways (13 units), Polregio (45 units), and Szybka Kolej Miejska in Tricity (3 units).

The series includes SA131, SA132, SA133, and SA134.

== History ==
=== Origins ===
Pesa had planned to build two-car and three-car diesel multiple units (DMUs) as early as 2001, following the production of its first single-car diesel vehicle, Pesa 214M. In the two-car version, the additional car could be either a trailer or a powered unit. Initially, the design envisioned connecting two cars similar to the 214M, with the driver's cabs on one side replaced by inter-car passageways. This vehicle would have a length of 49 meters. Each car was intended to run on its own two-axle bogies. The planned two-car unit was to be designated as 217M.

Ultimately, Pesa decided on a slightly different design and began production of the 218Mx family in 2005. The first member of this family was the 218M, designated as SA131-001, which was produced for the Pomeranian Voivodeship.

=== Series SA131-134 ===
When assigning series designations to the 218M family, it was decided to classify these vehicles as railbuses. However, the numbering range allocated for such vehicles (SA101-SA110) in the system of designations for diesel railcars established on 1 April 1970 had already been exhausted. Therefore, the new units were given numbers starting from 131, the lowest number not covered by the existing standard. The SA131 series includes only one vehicle of the 218M type. The 218Ma and 218Mb variants were assigned the SA132 series, while the 218Mc variant was assigned the SA133 series. The first 218Md vehicle, produced for Arriva RP, was initially designated as SA132-016. However, it was later decided to create a new series, reclassifying this vehicle as SA134-001.

=== Orders ===
- 7 December 2004 – contract signed for the delivery of one 218M DMU for the Pomeranian Voivodeship.
- 10 May 2005 – contract signed for the delivery of one 218Ma DMU for the Greater Poland Voivodeship.
- Unknown Date – contract signed for the delivery of one 218Mb DMU for the Lower Silesian Voivodeship.
- 29 March 2006 – contract signed for the delivery of two 218Ma DMUs for the Greater Poland Voivodeship.
- 30 May 2006 – contract signed for the delivery of three 218Mb DMUs for the Pomeranian Voivodeship.
- 28 June 2006 – contract signed for the delivery of two 218Mc DMUs for the Podlaskie Voivodeship.
- 6 July 2006 – contract signed for the delivery of two 218Mc DMUs for the Lesser Poland Voivodeship.
- 11 September 2006 – contract signed for the delivery of four 218Mc DMUs for the Lubusz Voivodeship.
- 22 December 2006 – contract signed for the delivery of eight 218Ma DMUs for the Greater Poland Voivodeship.
- Unknown date – contract signed for the delivery of two 218Md DMUs for Arriva RP.
- 16 July 2007 – contract signed for the delivery of five 218Md DMUs for the Lower Silesian Voivodeship.
- 24 July 2008 – contract signed for the delivery of two 218Md DMUs for the Greater Poland Voivodeship.
- 4 March 2009 – contract signed for the delivery of four 218Mc DMUs for the Podlaskie Voivodeship.
- 3 December 2009 – contract signed for the delivery of five 218Md DMUs for the Lublin Voivodeship.
- 20 May 2010 – contract signed for the delivery of three 218Mc DMUs for the Warmian–Masurian Voivodeship.
- 27 May 2010 – contract signed for the delivery of three 218Md DMUs for the Lower Silesian Voivodeship.
- 14 October 2010 – contract signed for the delivery of two 218Md DMUs for the Lubusz Voivodeship.
- 19 October 2010 – contract signed for the delivery of one 218Md DMU for the Subcarpathian Voivodeship.
- 26 November 2010 – contract signed for the delivery of two 218Mc DMUs for the Podlaskie Voivodeship.
- 8 November 2011 – contract signed for the delivery of four 218Mc DMUs for Arriva RP.
- 9 October 2012 – contract signed for the delivery of three 218Md DMUs for the Lublin Voivodeship.
- 21 August 2013 – contract signed for the delivery of one 218Md DMU for the Subcarpathian Voivodeship.
- 24 April 2014 – contract signed for the delivery of four 218Mc DMUs for the Pomeranian Voivodeship.

=== Promotional presentations ===
The prototype of the 218M family, SA131-001, made its debut in October 2005 at the Trako trade fair in Gdańsk. Between 17 and 25 February 2006, the Lower Silesian SA132-002 embarked on a series of promotional runs during which it was showcased in cities such as Kraków, Toruń, and the Upper Silesia region. In September 2006, the Podlaskie SA133-001 was presented at the InnoTrans fair in Berlin.

=== Issues with the 37AN bogie ===
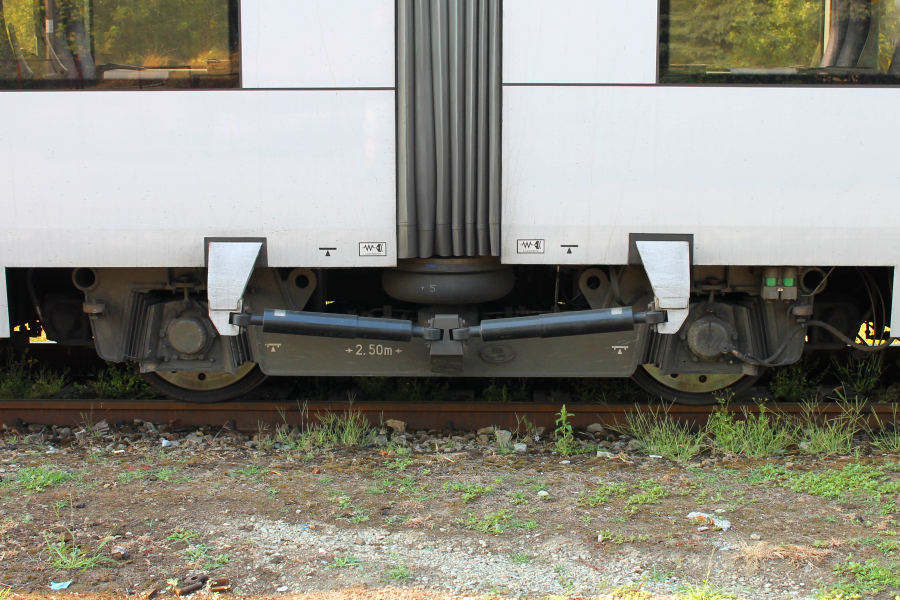
Type 37AN bogie

The vehicles of the 218M family are equipped with a type 37AN Jacobs bogie, designed by Ryszard Suwalski. This bogie underwent extensive testing at the Tabor Railway Vehicle Institute, where its 30-year operational lifespan was simulated. However, on 22 December 2015, a crack was discovered in the frame of this bogie on the SA134-011 vehicle, which belonged to the Opole Voivodeship. As a result, all SA134 units in the region were taken out of service, and a decision was made to replace the bogies with new ones. All two-car units of the 218M family began undergoing intensified inspections of their bogies every 14 days. By mid-February 2016, a total of 12 units had been withdrawn from service. During this period, operators like Lower Silesian Railways sent two vehicles (from the SA132 and SA134 series) back to the manufacturer to replace the potentially damaged bogies with new ones. On 19 February, in response to this situation, the Office of Rail Transport issued a safety alert in the Safety Information System managed by the European Union Agency for Railways.

Similar issues also arose with the three-car SA136 series vehicles, which used the same bogies.

== Construction ==
The 218M family of diesel multiple units consists of two-car, single-space vehicles powered by diesel engines. This family was developed as an evolution of the single-car Pesa 214M and also built on the experience gained from constructing the 13WE series.

=== Propulsion ===
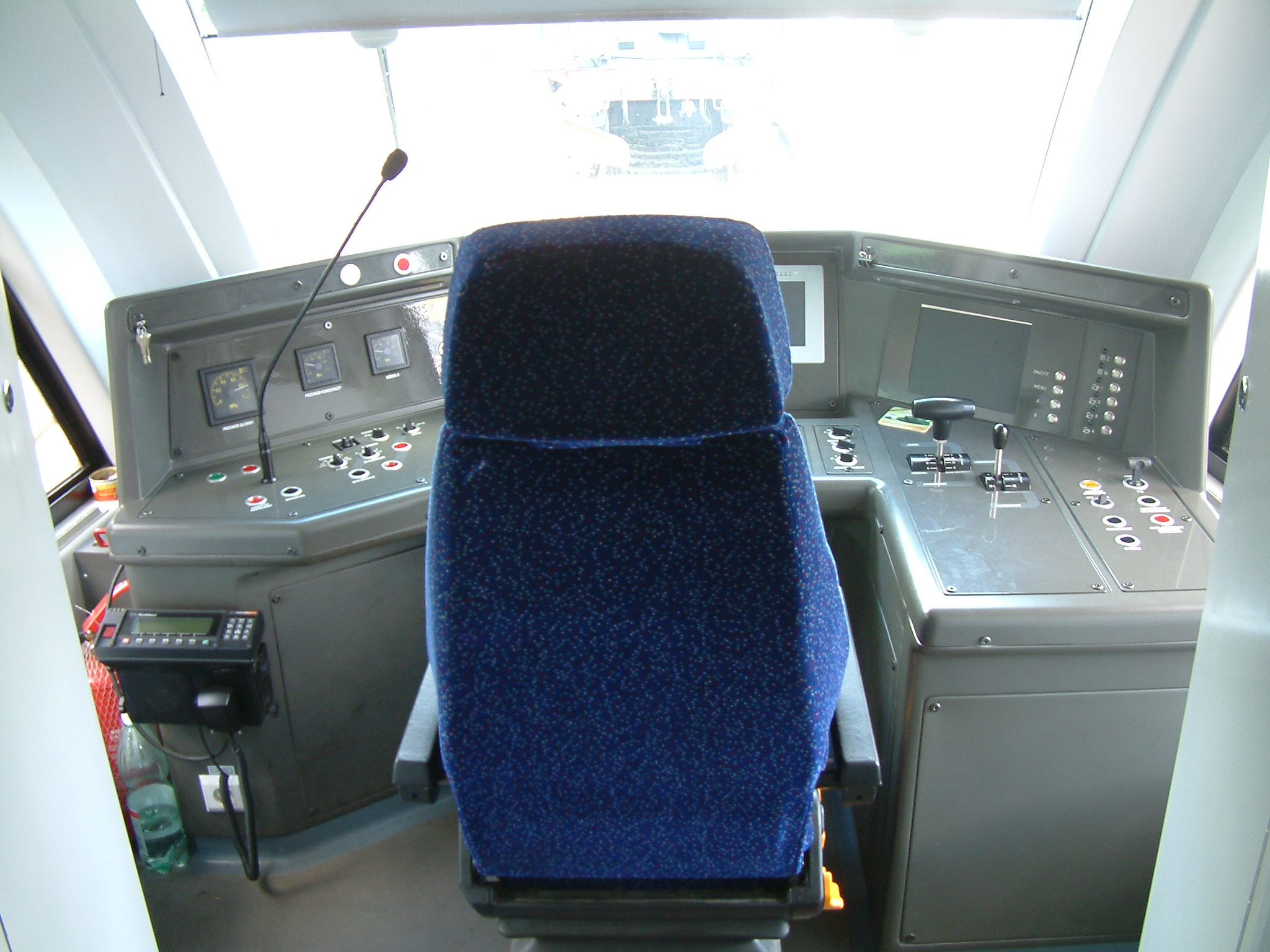
Driver's cabin in SA132-008

The prototype of the 218M family has a single diesel engine located in car A. The vehicle uses the same propulsion unit as the 214M type but with larger dimensions and increased capacity. Subsequent vehicles were designed with dual propulsion systems, one in each car. This configuration improved the vehicle's traction characteristics, reduced the risk of complete immobilization due to engine failure (allowing continued operation using the remaining engine), and lowered average fuel consumption. Each vehicle has two fuel tanks with capacities of 580 liters (218Ma, 218Mb, 218Md), 650 liters (218Md Mińsk-2), or 750 liters (218Mc).

Each propulsion system consists of a diesel engine and a turbo transmission. The propulsion unit is connected via a drive shaft to an intermediate axle transmission on the first wheelset of the drive bogie. Power is then transferred through another shaft from the intermediate axle transmission to the final axle transmission on the second wheelset of the drive bogie.

Multiple-unit operation is possible with up to 3 vehicles, including with vehicles from the 214M family.

=== Bogies and suspension ===
Each 218Mx vehicle is equipped with three two-axle bogies. The first vehicle of the family (218M SA131-001) has end bogies identical to those used in the Pesa 214M: a drive bogie JBg 3964 and a non-driven bogie JBg 3965. Additionally, a Jacobs-type 37AN non-driven bogie is used (common to both cars). In subsequent vehicles, the non-driven JBg bogie was replaced by a second drive bogie JBg 3964. The bogie pivot distance is 17.2 meters.

The vehicles have a two-stage suspension system. The first stage uses metal-rubber elements, and the second stage uses pneumatic springs to connect the car body to the bogies.

=== Car body ===
The 218Mx vehicles were produced with three different body shapes. The first shape, introduced in 2005 for the 218M, 218Mb, and 218Ma (up to SA132-007), was similar to the 214Ma and later 214M. The first change occurred in 2006 with the introduction of the SA133 (218Mc). Later, a similar body shape was also used for the SA132 series from number 008 onwards (218Mb) and SA134 (218Md). Another distinctive appearance was seen in vehicles produced by Pesa in Mińsk Mazowiecki (SA134-015 to SA134-029). Among these, the SA134-026 to SA134-029 units stand out for their lack of bogie covers and the relocation of the front destination display above the driver's cabin.

The vehicle frames of the 218M family are welded steel, while the bodywork is aluminum, bonded to the structure. The construction strength meets the PN-EN 12663 (category PIII) standard. The vehicles use sliding-accordion doors.

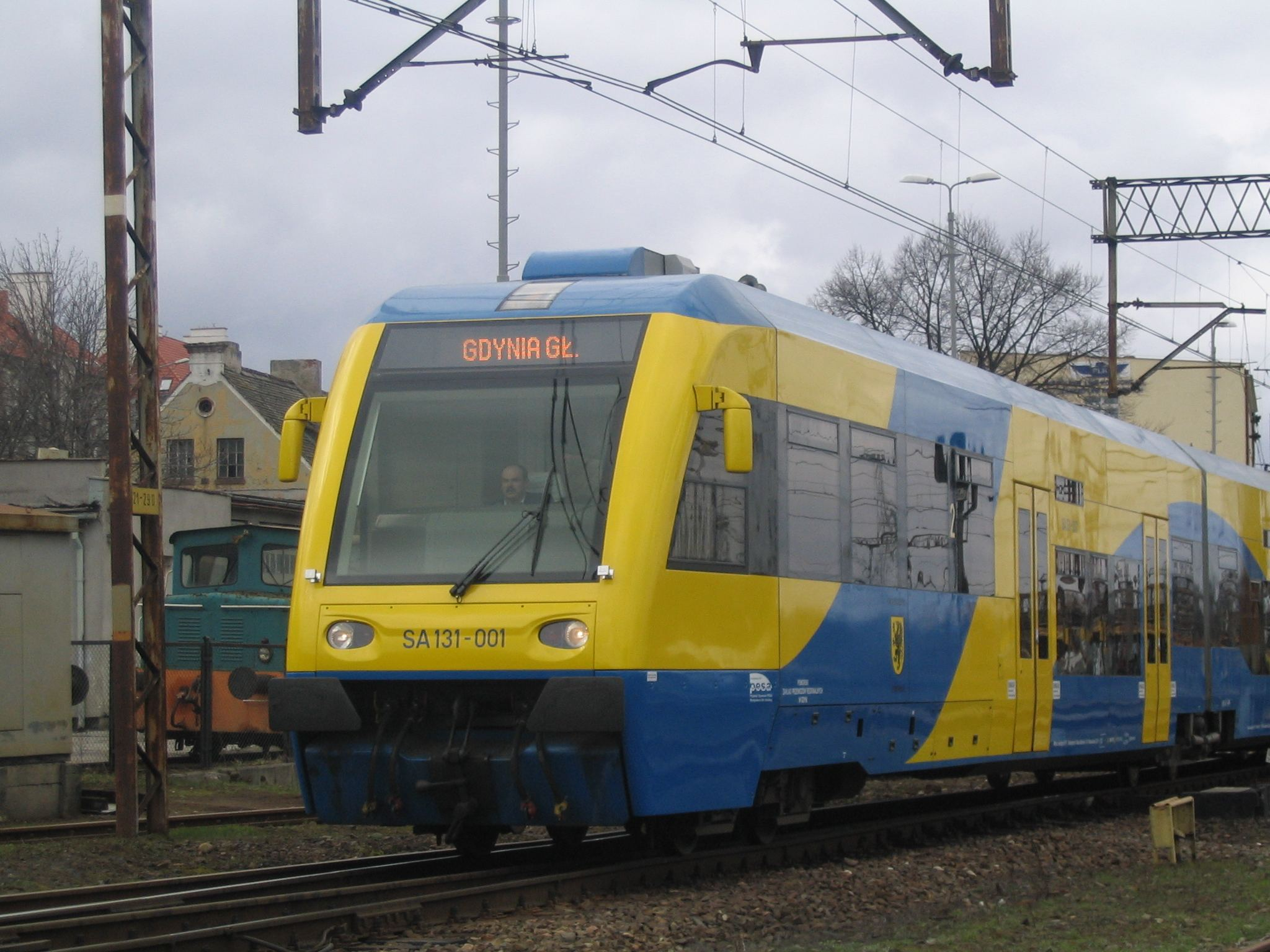
218M (SA131-001)

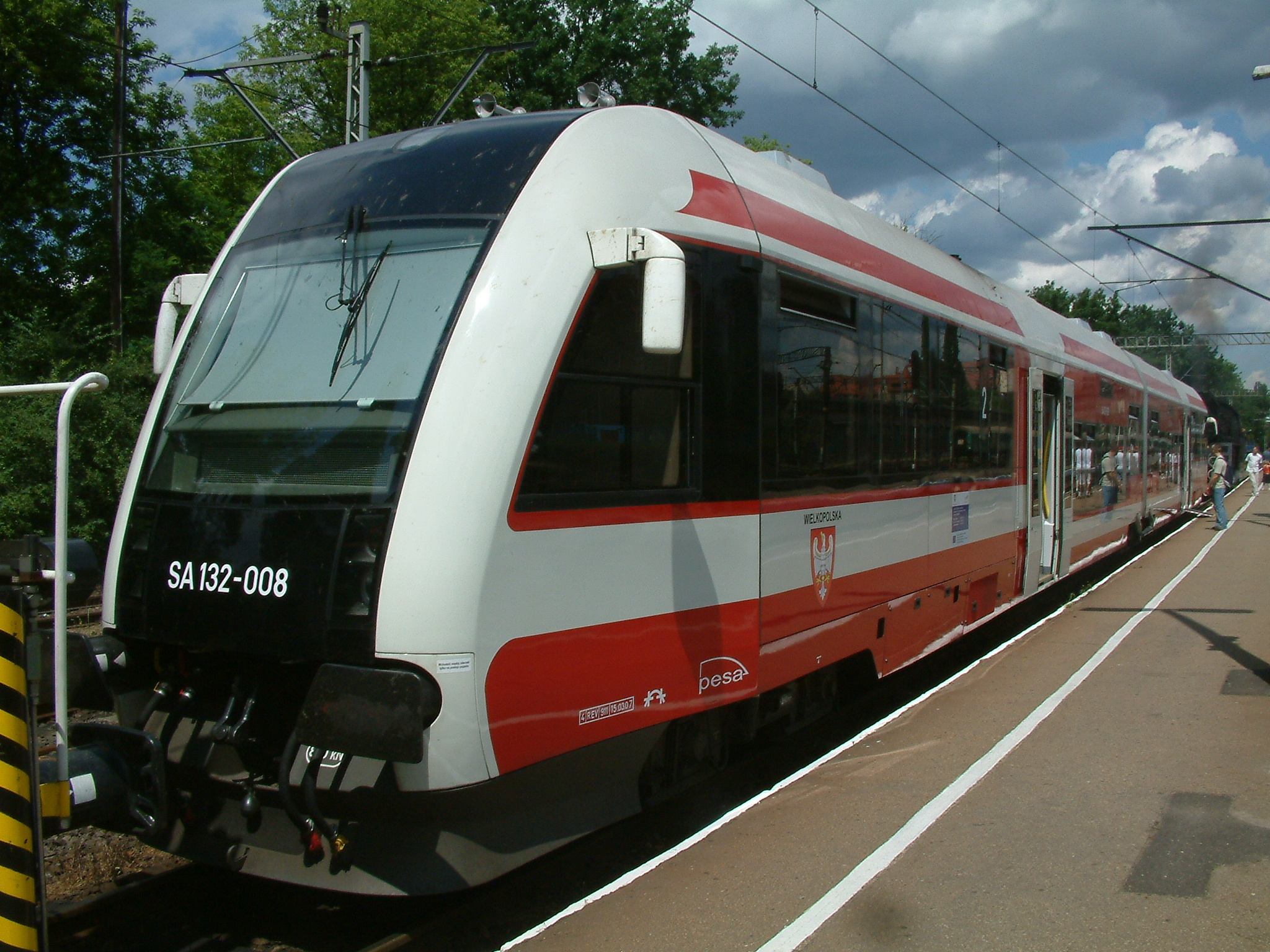
218Ma (SA132-008)

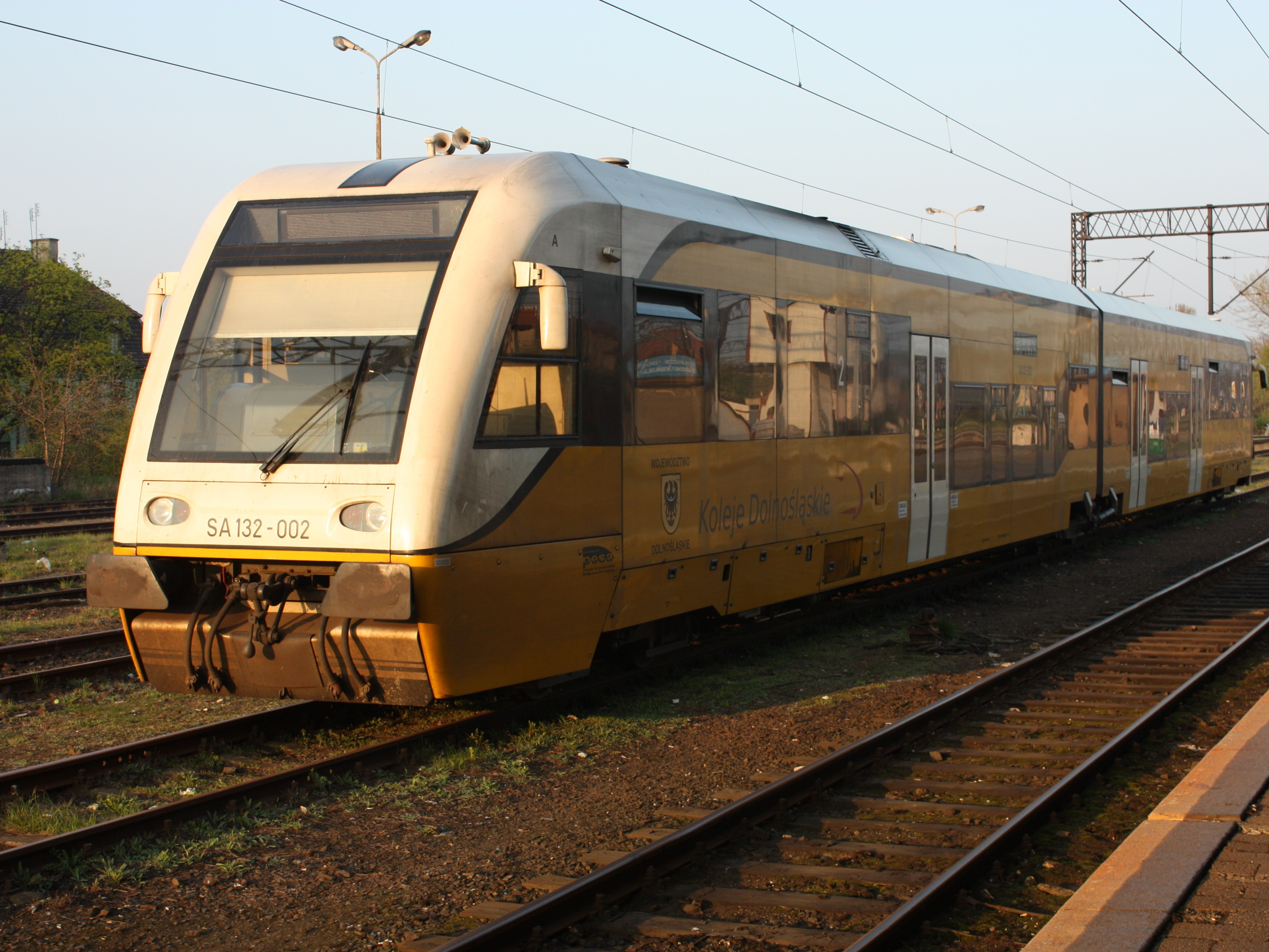
218Mb (SA132-002)

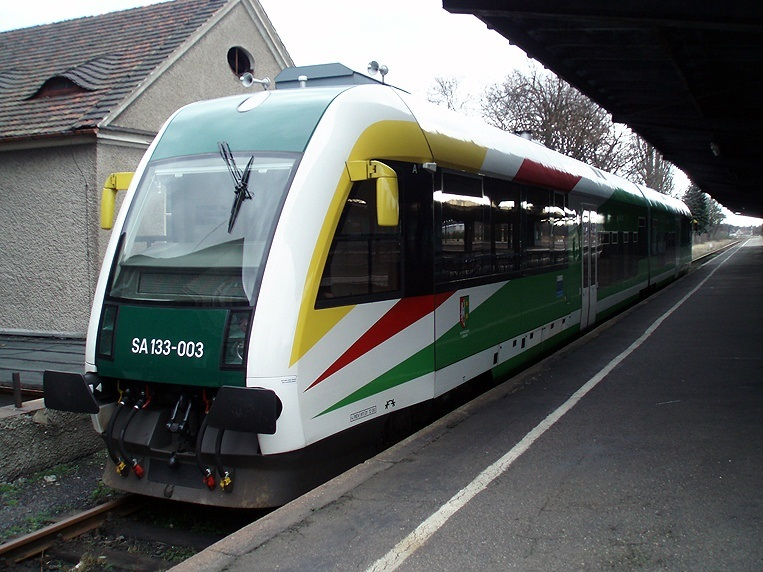
218Mc (SA133-003)

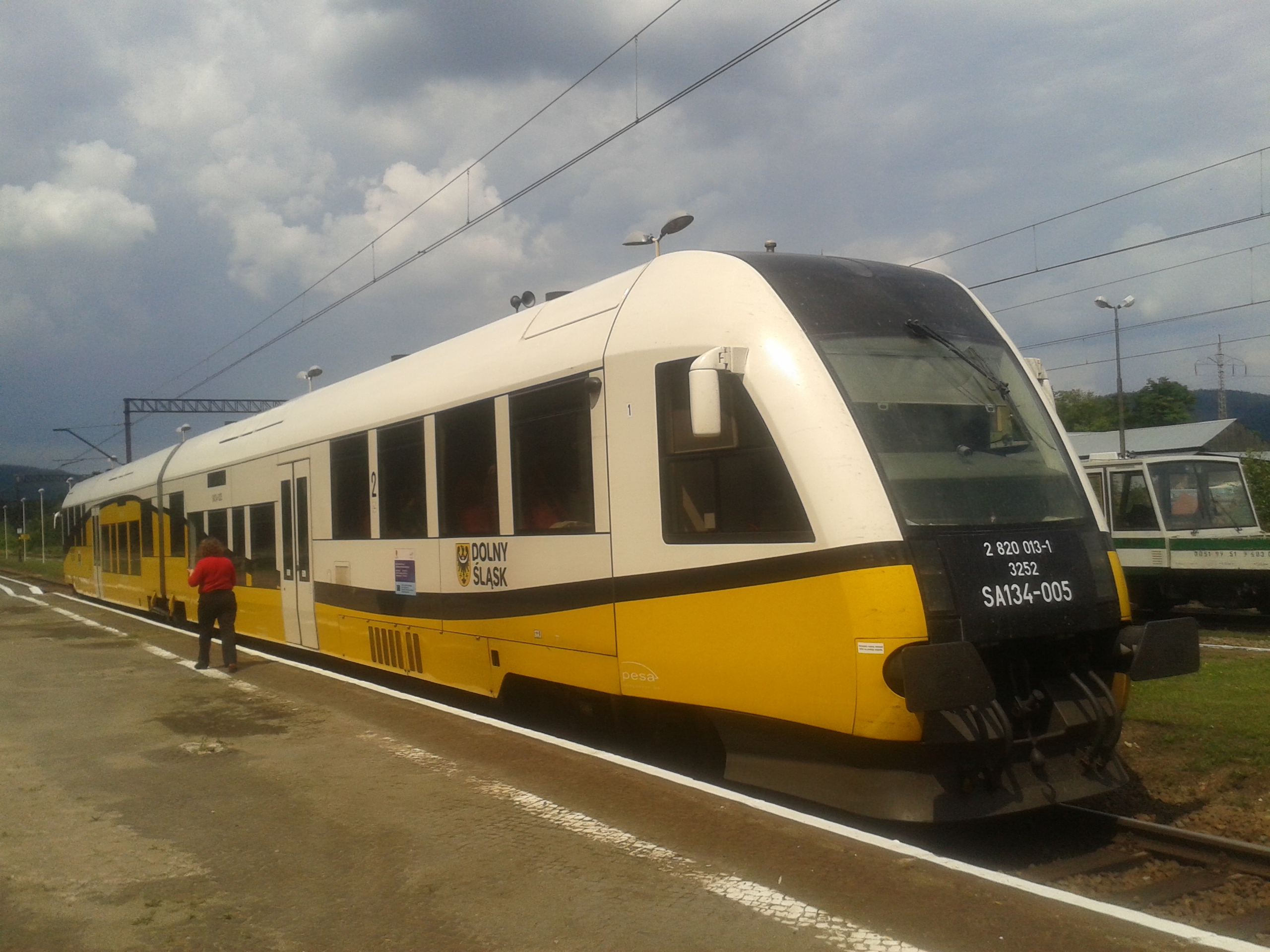
218Md (SA134-005)

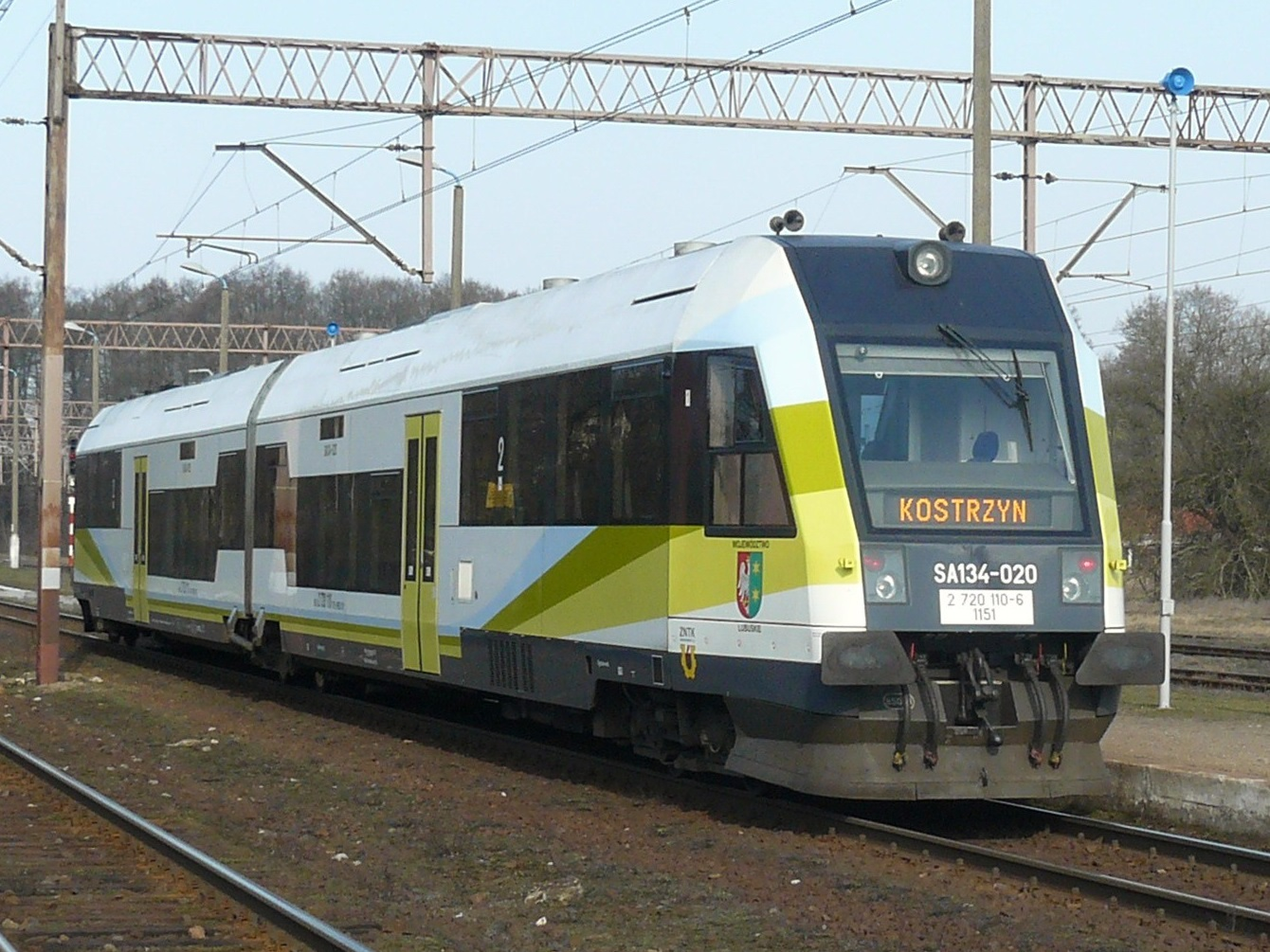
218Md Mińsk 2 (SA134-020)

=== Passenger space ===
The train is designed to accommodate passengers with disabilities, featuring 1,300 mm wide entrances, approximately 50% low-floor area (600 mm from the rail head), a ramp, and a suitably adapted toilet (with a closed system). Heating is provided by heat from the engine cooling system, a Webasto Thermo 350 heater, and additional electric blowers installed in the door vestibules. The detailed interior arrangement, monitoring, and air conditioning are customized according to the customer's requirements. The materials used also differ between vehicles manufactured by Pesa and those by its Mińsk Mazowiecki branch. Seats vary across vehicles purchased by different voivodeships.

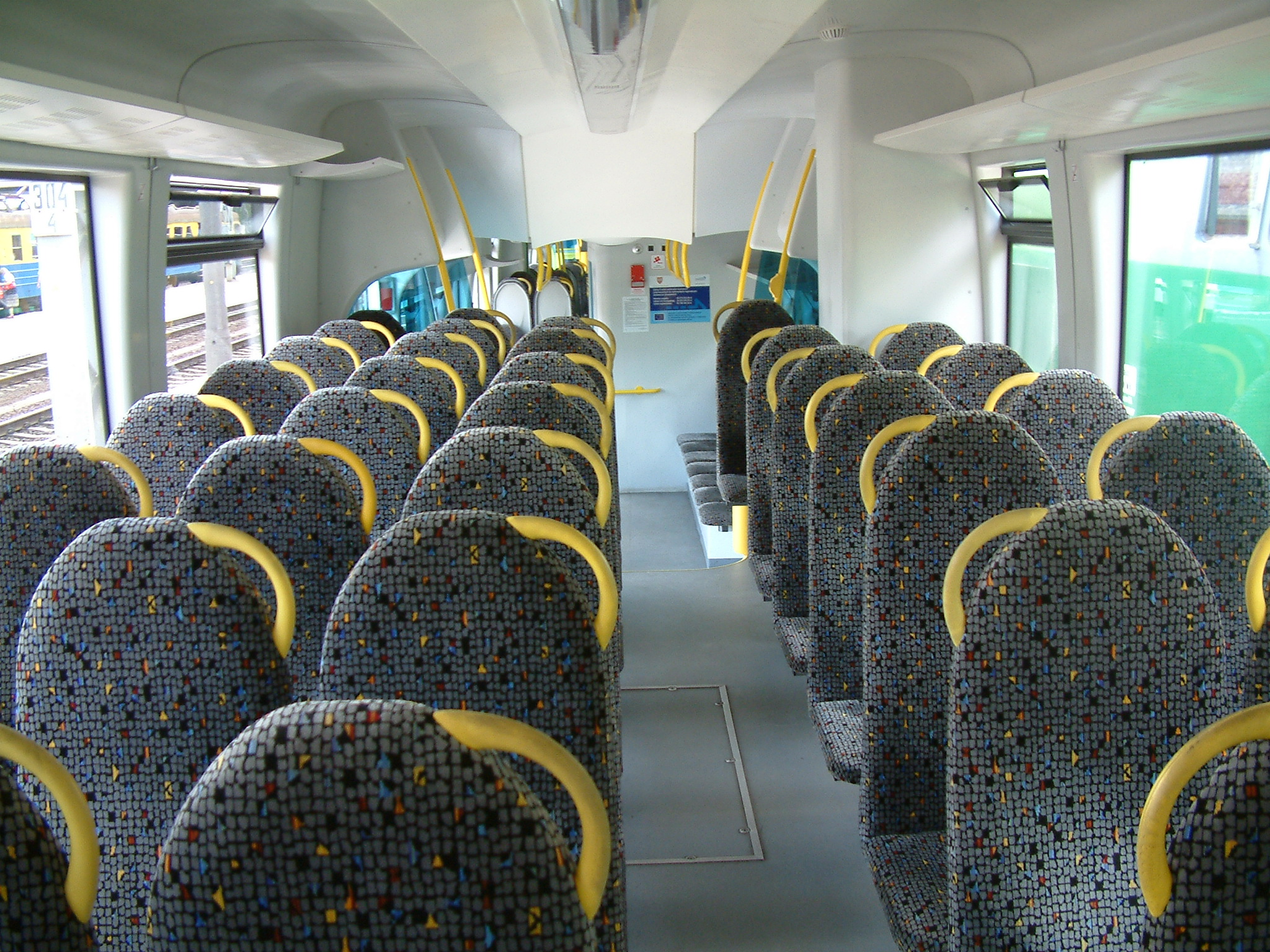
SA132-008 has 175 seating places

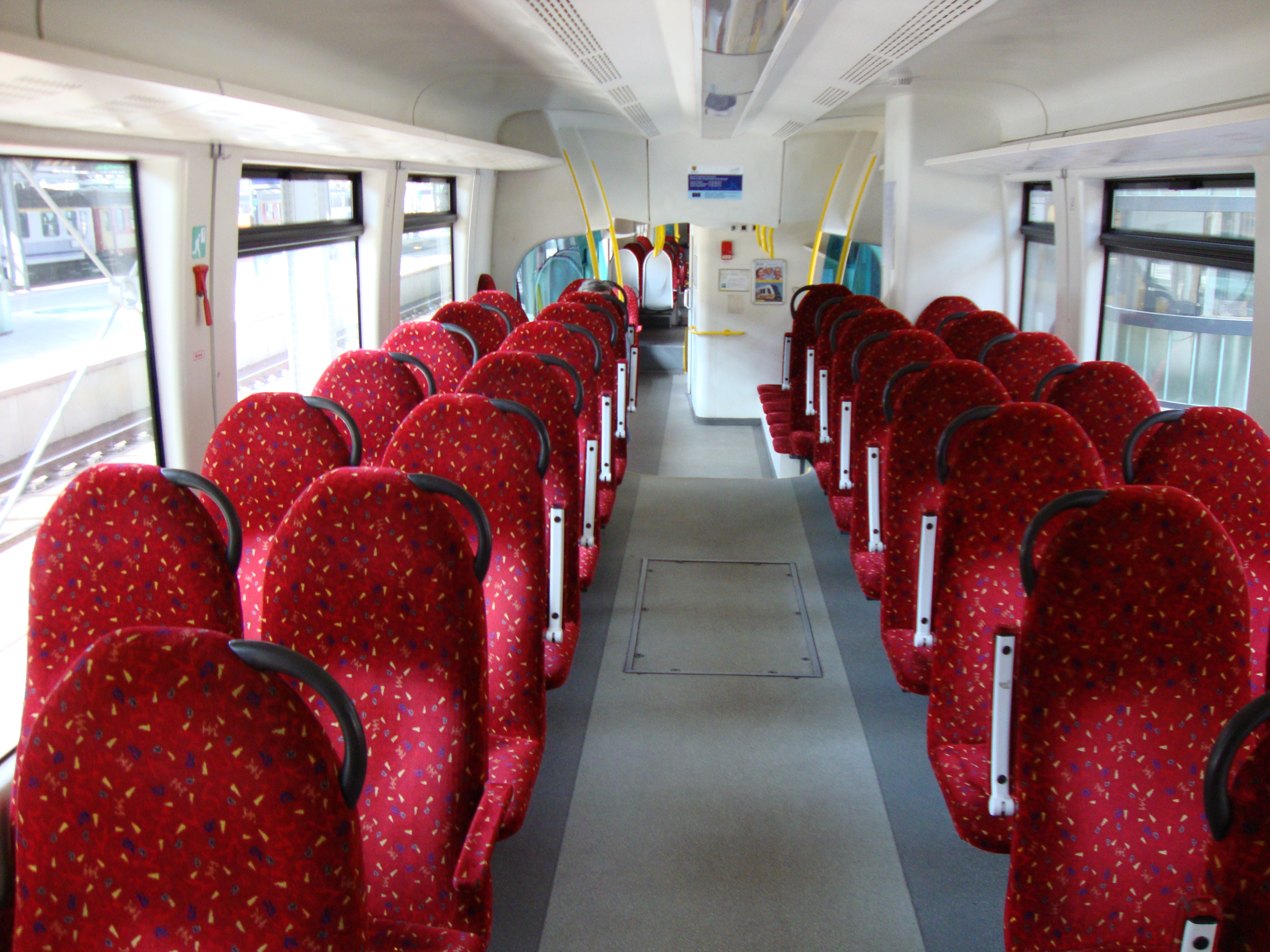
SA134-006 Pesa: high-floor section

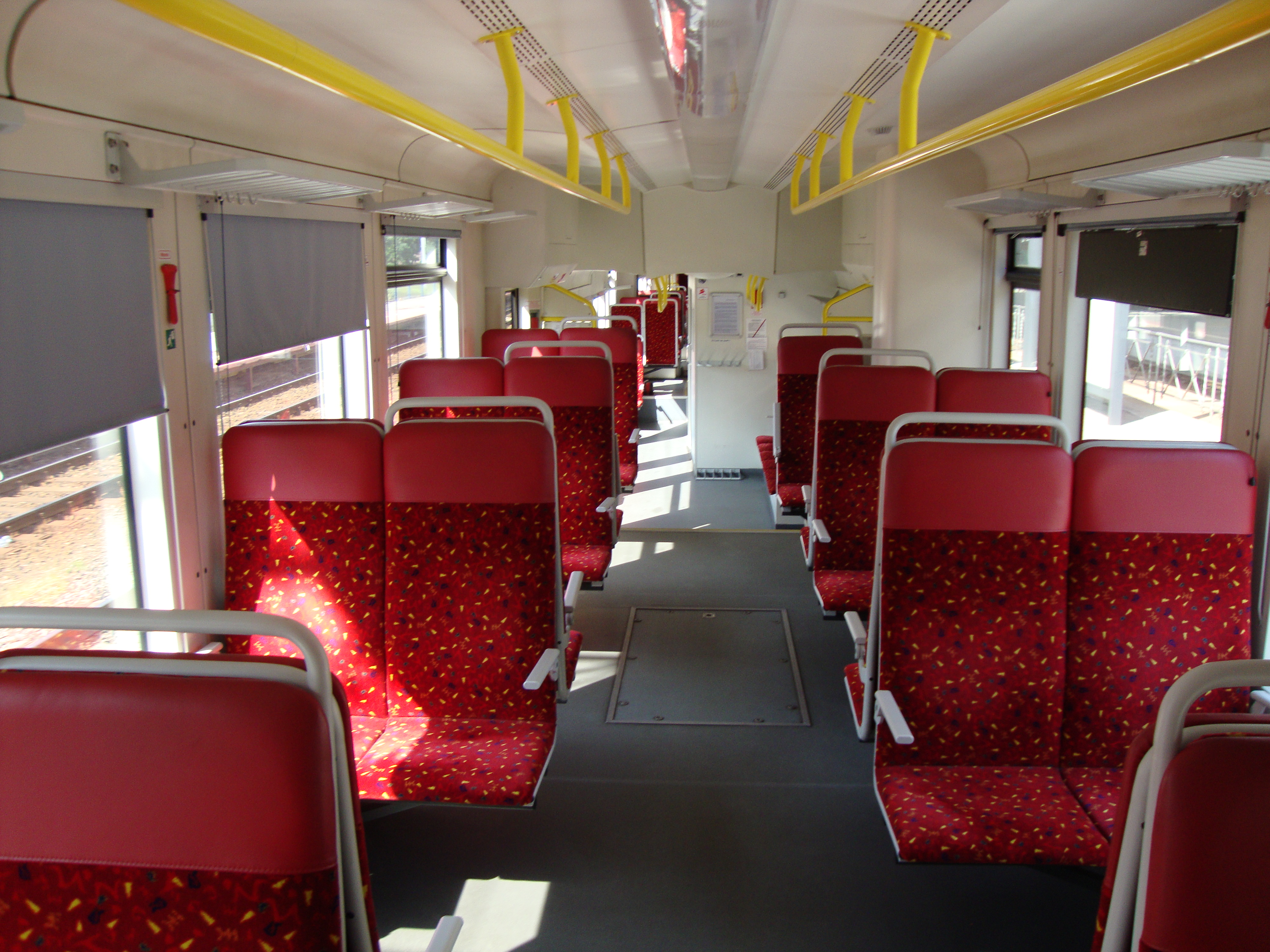
SA134-024 Mińsk 2: high-floor section

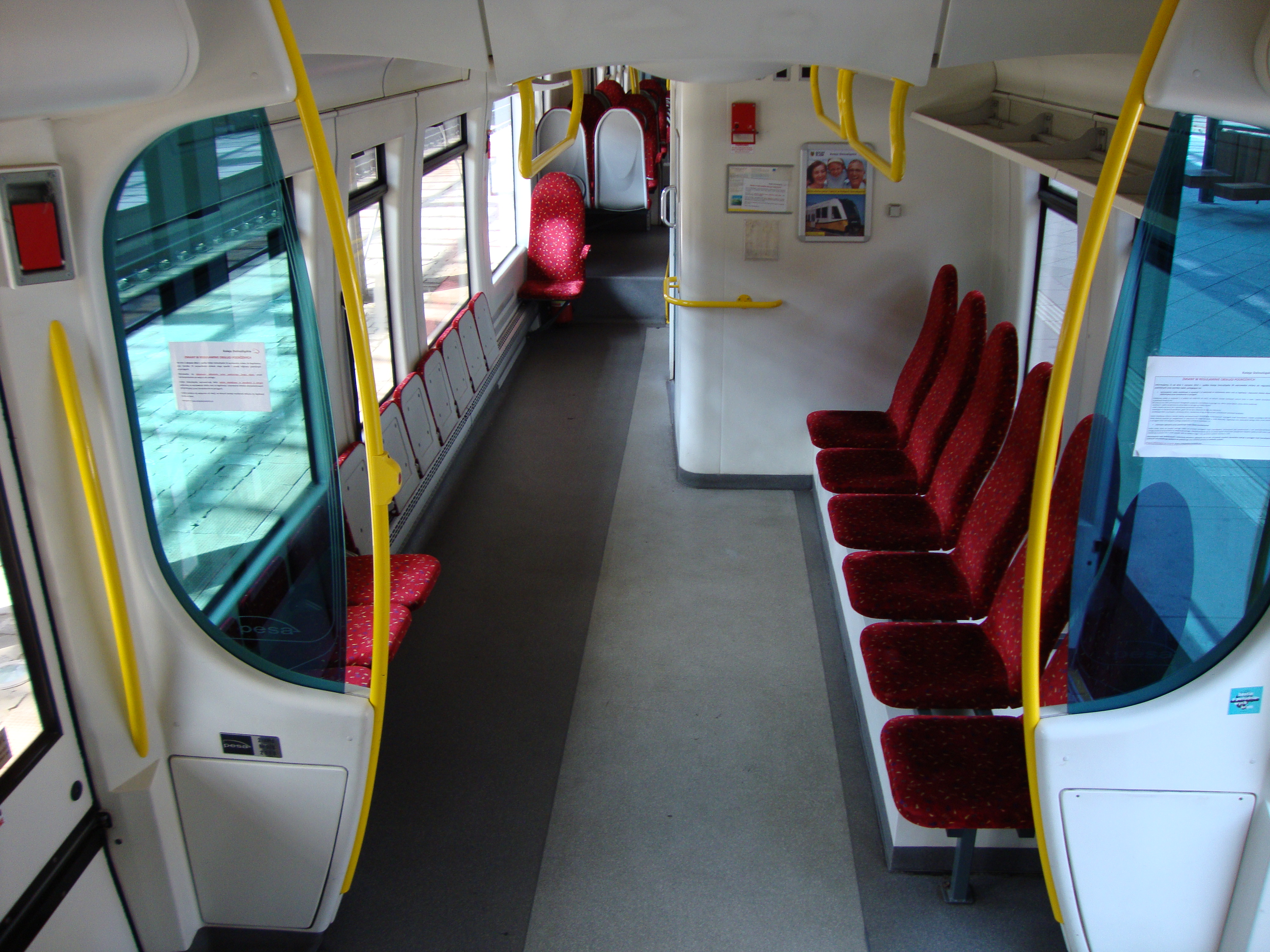
SA134-006 Pesa: multi-functional space

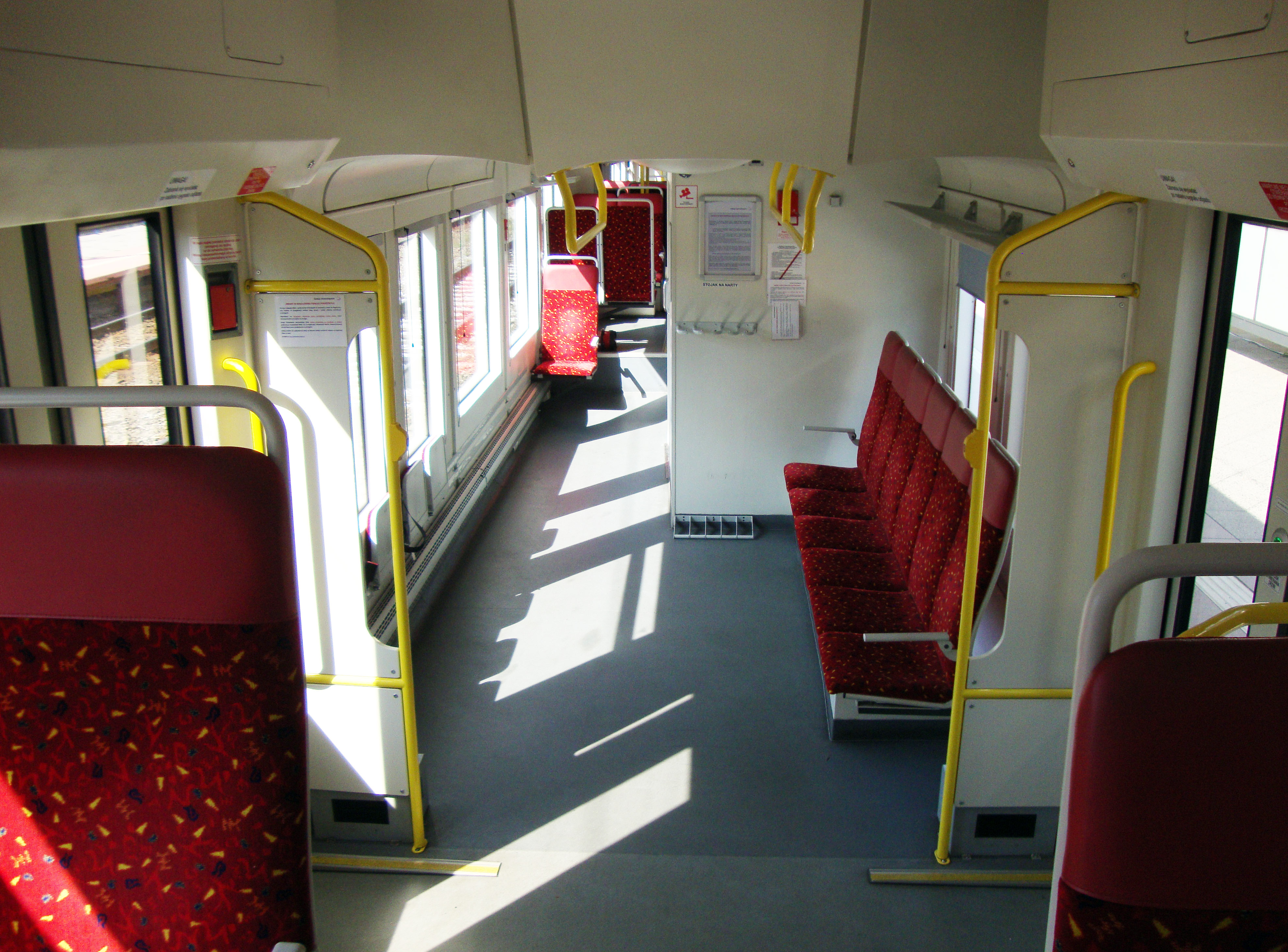
SA134-024 Mińsk 2: m

=== Safety ===
The 218Mx vehicles are equipped with standard train protection systems: dead man's switch, automatic train braking, Radio-Stop, and fire alarm systems.

=== Characterization of subtypes ===
Type	Series	Wheel arrangement	Number of engines	Engine type	Power per engine	Transmission type	Service mass	Number of doors per side	Number of seats	Number of units produced	Sources
218M	SA131	B'2'2'	1	Iveco V8 SVQE283	500 kW	Voith T212 bre (hydraulic)	81 t	3	118	1	
218Ma	SA132	B'2'B'	2	MTU 6H1800R81	350 kW	ZF 5-HP600R (hydr.-mech.)	74.6 t/83 t (varies by source)	2	140–175	11	
218Mb	SA132	B'2'B'	2	MTU 6H1800R80/6H1800R81	350 kW	ZF 5-HP600R (hydr.-mech.)	78.5 t	3	164	4	
218Mc	SA133 (001-020)	B'2'B'	2	MAN D2876LUE623	382 kW	Voith T211 bre (hydraulic)	82 t	2	134–146	20	
218Mc	SA133 (021-024)	B'2'B'	2	Voith R2876T3-390	390 kW	Voith	82 t	2	120	4	
218Md	SA134 (001-014)	B'2'B'	2	MTU 6H1800 R83P	350/360 kW (varies by source)	ZF 5-HP902 (hydr.-mech.)	76 t	2	134	14	
218Md Mińsk 2	SA134 (015-025)	B'2'B'	2	MTU 6H1800 R83P	360 kW	ZF 5-HP902	76 t	2	120–134	11	

=== Modernizations ===
Lesser Poland Voivodeship

In 2015, during a revision repair, one of the SA134 units in Lesser Poland Voivodeship was equipped with USB chargers. Due to the specific electrical installation, it was not possible to install standard electrical outlets.

In 2017, one of the SA134 units in Lesser Poland, number 005, underwent a revision repair. The scope of work included the replacement of the passenger information system, new passenger seats, installation of USB chargers, and a change in exterior paint. Additionally, its body structure was covered with reflective foil.

Lublin Voivodeship

In October 2015, Lublin Voivodeship's government signed a contract with Pesa for the modernization of SA134-015 ÷ 019. This modernization was to include the upgrading of the passenger information system, replacement of laminated track guards with steel ones, modernization of vehicle monitoring, securing of buffer power supplies, and installation of oil filter covers.

==== Lubusz Voivodeship ====
On 22 November 2013, Polregio placed an order with the manufacturer for the modernization of the Lubusz unit SA133-003 during its P4-level revision repair. On 11 September 2014, the Marshal's Office of the Lubusz Voivodeship awarded Pesa a contract for the modernization of SA133-007, also in conjunction with a P4-level repair.

The order descriptions highlighted the need to replace some factory-installed components:

- Replacement of WDM-type pressure relays with Moller-type relays
- Replacement of EV-3 type valves (SHP, CA, RADIOSTOP) with Knorr safety valves or their equivalents
- Replacement of the EV-5 spring brake valve with a valve and reducer from Dako or an equivalent
- Installation of air dryers (one per unit)
- Replacement of the monitoring system
- Reconstruction of water drains from the roof
- Installation of manometers for the second powered and idle bogie in each cabin
- Replacement of heaters with more powerful ones in the driver's cabin
- Installation of an emergency brake on the console of each cabin
- Adaptation of the vehicle to current legal requirements regarding the passenger information system and directional signs

In July 2015, the Marshal's Office signed an agreement with Pesa for the modernization of SA133-008, with a similar scope as previous modernizations. In November 2016, another modernization order was placed for SA133-006, including the installation of air dryers, a new monitoring system, an automatic passenger counting system, and an upgraded passenger information system.

In August 2017, the Marshal's Office announced a tender for a PU4-level inspection of units SA134-020 ÷ 021, combined with the modernization of the passenger information system. On October 23, the office signed a contract with ASO Mieczkowski for this task, and on 28 March 2018, the company delivered the first completed unit.

==== Opole Voivodeship ====
In May 2017, the Marshal's Office of the Opole Voivodeship announced a tender for the revision repair of all five SA134 units, including the replacement of the passenger information system and a change in paintwork. Pesa undertook the realization of this order.

==== Podlaskie Voivodeship ====
On 1 October 2015, the Marshal's Office signed a contract with Pesa for the revision repair and modernization of SA133-001 and 002.

==== Subcarpathian Voivodeship ====
In early November 2015, the Subcarpathian Voivodeship announced a tender to equip SA134-022 with ticket machines.

==== Greater Poland Voivodeship ====
On 2 March 2015, the Marshal's Office signed a contract with Pesa for the revision repair and modernization of SA132-001, 003, and 004. The modernization included the replacement of seats, installation of blinds, and expansion of the passenger information system. On October 30, the office signed an agreement with Pesa to extend the order to include the repair of SA132-013.

In June 2016, the Marshal's Office signed a contract with Pesa for the modernization of SA132-008 ÷ 012. Three vehicles were to be equipped with air conditioning, all vehicles were to receive online diagnostics, a new monitoring system, and a passenger information system. The number of seats was to be reduced to 128 (including 10 foldable), and a service compartment, bike racks, and baby changing tables in the toilets were to be added.

In February 2018, the office signed a contract with Pesa for the modernization of SA132-014, which included the replacement of the air conditioning system, modernization of the pneumatic system, replacement of passenger seats, modernization of the monitoring system and passenger information system, installation of window blinds, and modernization of the brake system, ATM system, toilet compartment, roof, heating system, and control and diagnostics system. In January 2019, a similar modernization agreement was signed for SA134-010.

== Operations ==
Owner	Operator	Type	Series	Numbers	Delivery years	Quantity	Sources
Arriva RP		218Md	SA134	001 ÷ 002	2007	6	
Arriva RP		218Mc	SA133	021 ÷ 024	2012	6	
Lower Silesian Voivodeship	Lower Silesian Railways	218Mb	SA132	002	2006	9	
Lower Silesian Voivodeship	Lower Silesian Railways	218Md	SA134	003 ÷ 007, 023 ÷ 025	2008–2011	9	
Lublin Voivodeship	Polregio	218Md	SA134	015 ÷ 019, 026 ÷ 028	2010, 2013	8	
Lubusz Voivodeship	Polregio	218Mc	SA133	003, 006 ÷ 008	2006–2008	6	
Lubusz Voivodeship	Polregio	218Md	SA134	020 ÷ 021	2011	6	
Lesser Poland Voivodeship	Polregio	218Mc	SA133	004 and 005	2007	2	
Opole Voivodeship	Polregio	218Md	SA134	009, 011 ÷ 014	2008–2009	5	
Subcarpathian Voivodeship	Polregio	218Md	SA134	022, 029	2011, 2014	2	
Podlaskie Voivodeship	Polregio	218Mc	SA133	001 ÷ 002, 009 ÷ 012, 019 ÷ 020	2006, 2009, 2011	8	
Pomeranian Voivodeship	Polregio	218M	SA131	001	2005	8	
Pomeranian Voivodeship	Polregio	218Mb	SA132	005 ÷ 007	2006	8	
Pomeranian Voivodeship	Polregio	218Mc	SA133	025 ÷ 028	2015	8	
Pomeranian Voivodeship	Polregio/Szybka Kolej Miejska	218Mc	SA133	029 ÷ 031	2015	3	
Warmian-Masurian Voivodeship	Polregio	218Mc	SA133	013 ÷ 018	2009–2010	6	
Greater Poland Voivodeship	Greater Poland Railways	218Ma	SA132	001, 003, 004, 008 ÷ 011, 013 ÷ 015	2005–2007	12 (13)	
Greater Poland Voivodeship	Greater Poland Railways	218Md	SA134	008, 010	2008	12 (13)	
Total:						76	

=== Arriva RP ===
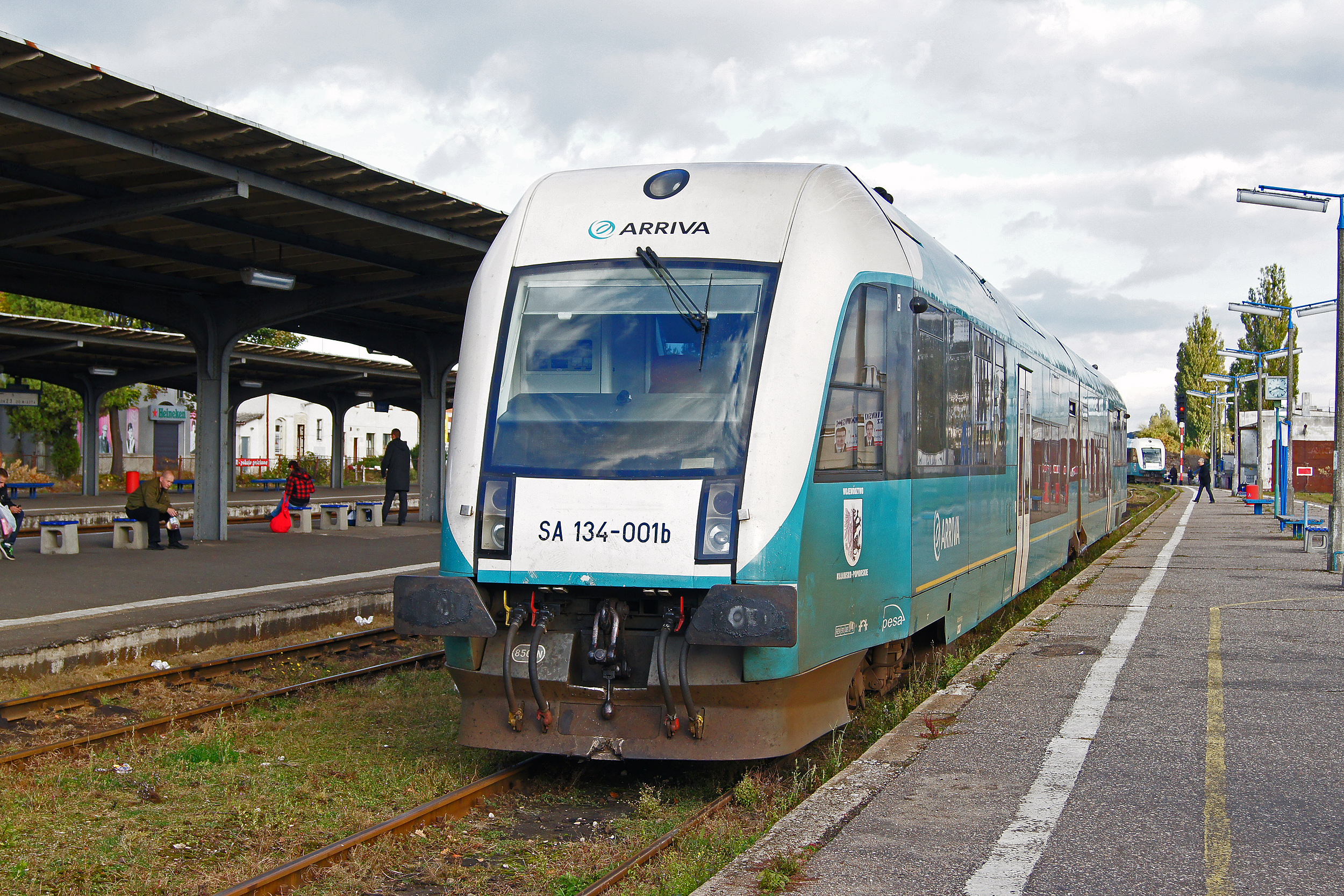
SA134-001 of Arriva RP

In December 2007, Arriva RP received two vehicles, 218Md, designated as SA134-001 and -002, purchased from Pesa.

A contract for the delivery of four additional 218Mc vehicles for this operator was signed with Pesa on 8 November 2011. The first units (SA133-021 and -022) were ceremoniously handed over on 30 November 2012. Official guests took a ride on the new vehicles from Bydgoszcz to Chełmża to Toruń. A public presentation was held at Toruń Wschodni railway station.

On 22 February 2017, one of Arriva's units was temporarily leased to Szybka Kolej Miejska in Tricity to service the Gdańsk Wrzeszcz–Gdańsk Osowa railway. In 2018, SA134-001 and 002 were leased by Greater Poland Railways. In March 2022, the SA134-001 unit was leased to Lower Silesian Railways.

=== Lower Silesian Voivodeship ===
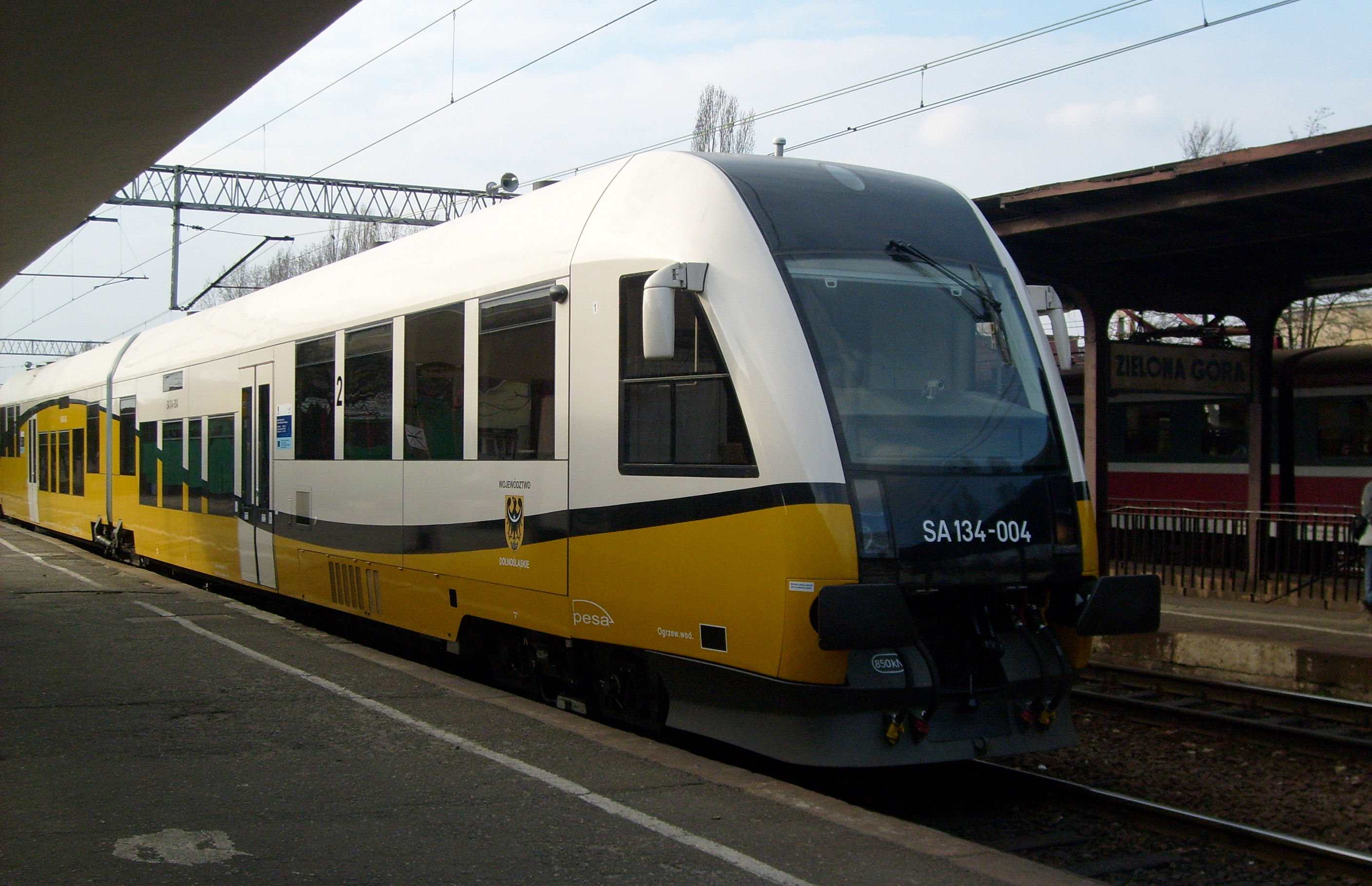
Lower Silesian SA134-004

The 218Mb (SA132-002) vehicle was handed over to the Lower Silesian Voivodeship after a series of promotional runs in February 2006.

On 16 July 2007, the Lower Silesian Marshal's Office placed an additional order, which included five two-car and three single-car (Pesa 214M) diesel units. The first of the five ordered SA134 units (No. 003) was presented at the Wrocław Główny railway station on 23 January 2008. Another unit (SA134-004) was delivered to the purchaser in early February 2008. Both trains were assigned to serve the routes Jelenia Góra–Węgliniec–Zielona Góra, Jelenia Góra–Węgliniec–Zgorzelec/Bolesławiec, and Legnica–Jelenia Góra. Later, three more two-car units (SA134-005, SA134-006, and SA134-007) were delivered.

On 14 December 2008, all vehicles that had previously been made available to the company Polregio (two Kolzam 212M, four Pesa 214M, and six Pesa 218M) were transferred to the newly launched Lower Silesian Railways. On 5 December 2009, Lower Silesian Railways reactivated the Kłodzko–Wałbrzych line, which was served, among others, by the SA132-002.

On 27 May 2010, Pesa was awarded a contract to deliver additional vehicles for Lower Silesian Railways: three two-car 218M units and six single-car 214M units. On 4 May 2011, Pesa handed over the first of the ordered two-car units – SA134-023 – to the carrier.

The Lower Silesian SA132-002 was used by the manufacturer from 17 to 22 February 2006 for promotional runs in the Lesser Poland, Silesian, Opole, and Lubusz voivodeships.

On 12 December 2012, the Lower Silesian SA134-006, running from Kłodzko to Legnica, collided with an excavator in Pasieczna.

At the end of March 2020, a decision was made to lease the SA132-002 railbus to Szybka Kolej Miejska in Tricity in exchange for EN57AKM-1718. On March 27, the vehicle departed from the Lower Silesian Railways base in Legnica for Gdynia Cisowa, and the following day it was transferred to the carrier. After a year of operation, in April 2021, the railbus returned to Lower Silesian Railways. In October 2021, another exchange took place, in which SA134-023 was leased in exchange for EN57AKM-1718 once again.

On 2 July 2022, the operation of SA134 units began, pulling a freight car designed for bicycle transport.

=== Lublin Voivodeship ===
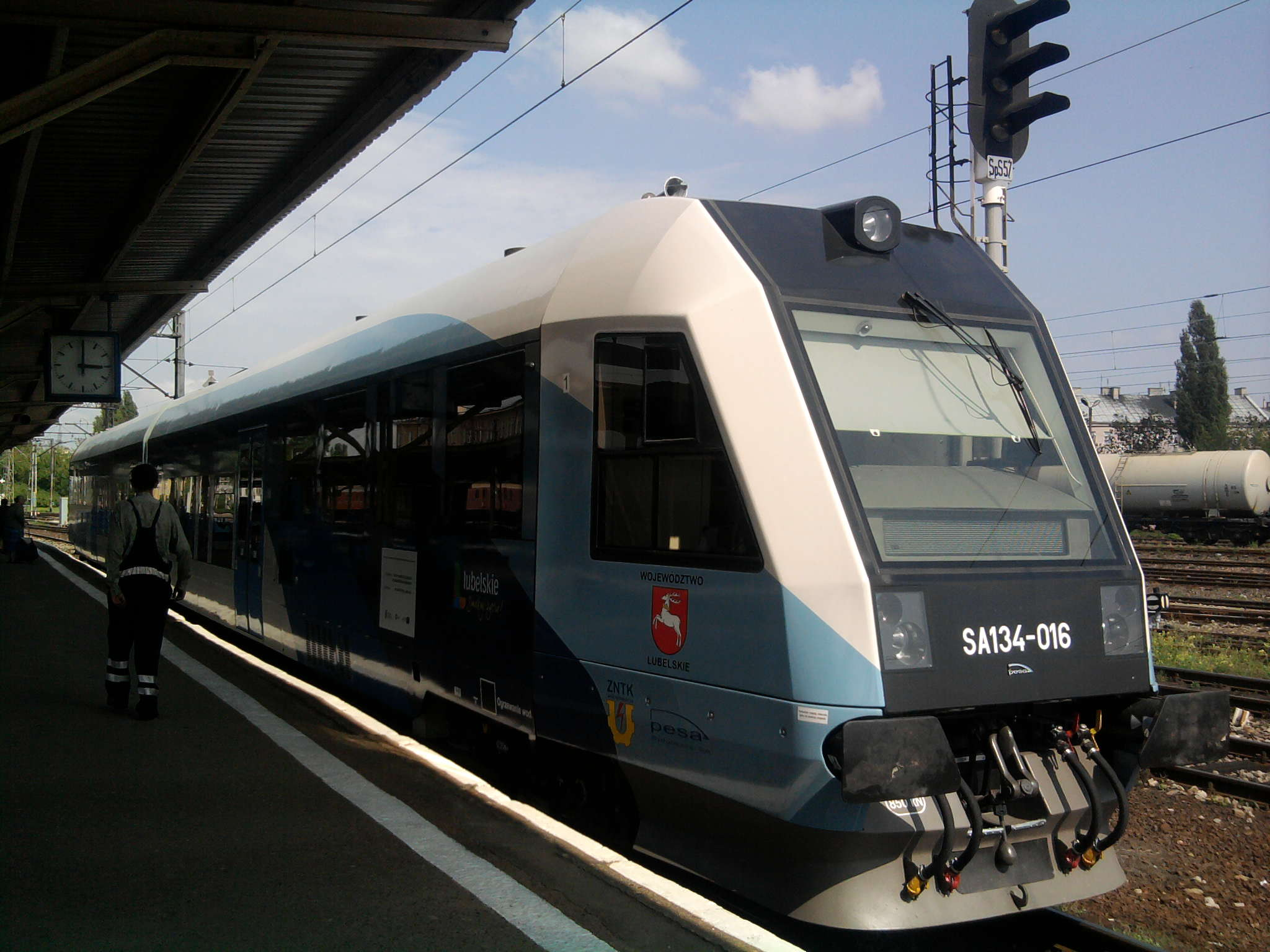
Lublin SA134-016

On 3 December 2009, representatives of the Lublin Marshal's Office signed a contract for the delivery of five diesel multiple units by a consortium of Pesa. These vehicles were ordered to serve three routes: from Lublin to Stalowa Wola, Lubartów, and the airport in Świdnik. On 24 June 2010, the first of the five 218Md units, designated as Mińsk 2, was handed over to the Lublin Regional Transport Division. The Lublin Marshal's Office had ordered these vehicles from Pesa. The fifth and final unit was delivered to Lublin on the night of 14/15 December of the same year. Besides serving routes within the Lublin Voivodeship, the trains were also deployed on the interregional route from Lublin to Rzeszów. This service was operated in conjunction with Subcarpathian Voivodeship's SA135 units but was discontinued in December 2012.

On 9 October 2012, a contract was signed with the Pesa consortium for the delivery of three additional units, with the first to be delivered in April and the last by September 2013.

On 26 February 2013, the Lublin SA134-019, operating the Zamość–Rejowiec route, collided with a car, causing the train to partially catch fire. In mid-2013, the vehicle was transported to the manufacturer, and on 24 June 2014, a contract was signed for its reconstruction.

On 2 April 2013, with the launch of passenger services on the route from Lublin to Lubartów, SA134-026 was officially presented for the Lublin Voivodeship. Later, two more units (SA134-027 and SA134-028) were delivered.

=== Lubusz Voivodeship ===
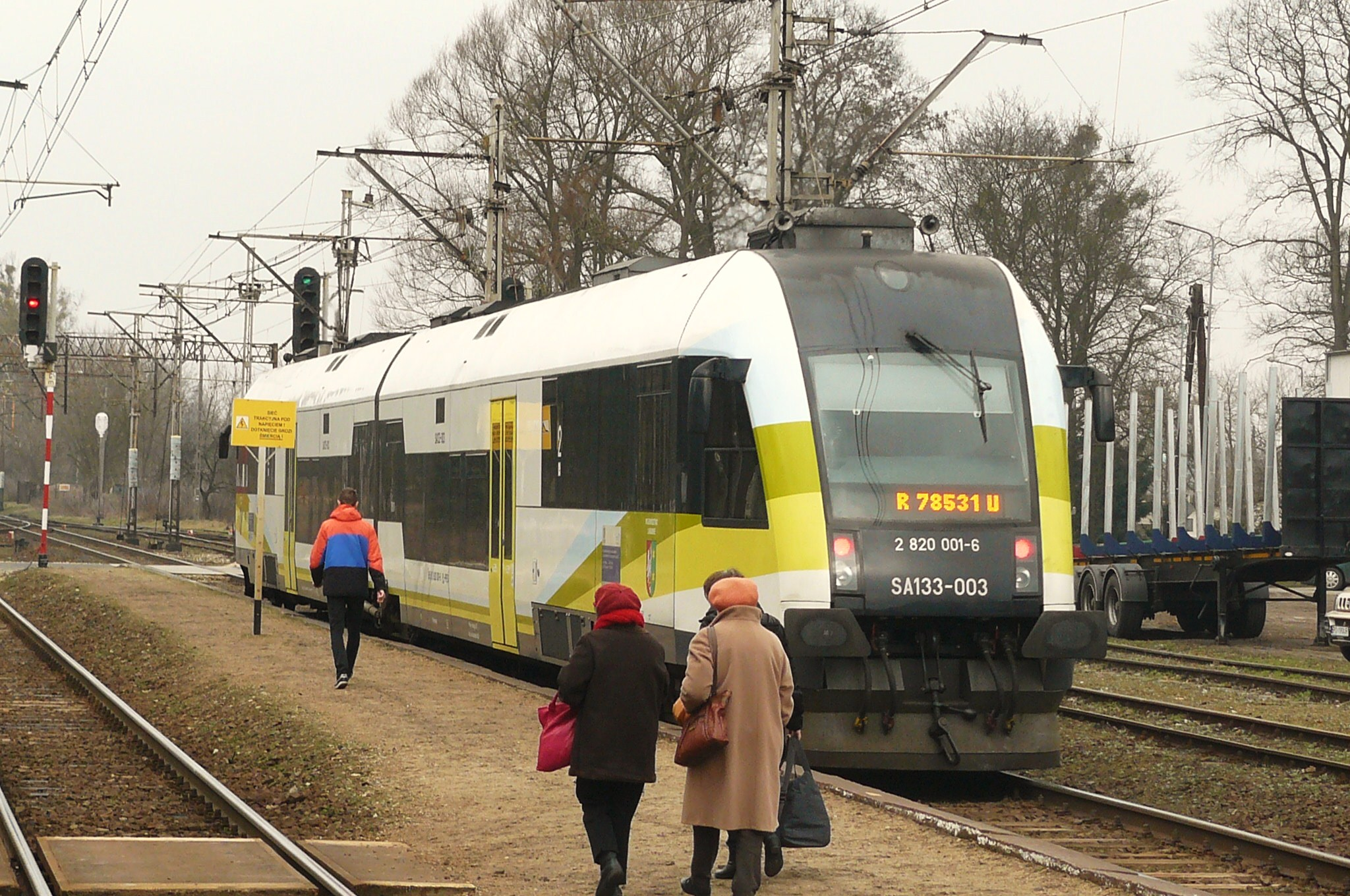
Lubusz SA133-003

On 11 September 2006, the Marshal of the Lubusz Voivodeship signed a contract with Pesa for the manufacture and delivery of four diesel multiple units. The first vehicle was delivered to Zielona Góra on 2 December 2006. A week later, on December 10, the new DMU was used to resume service on the Żagań–Szprotawa–Niegosławice and Żary–Iłowa–Węgliniec routes, which had been suspended since 2002, and to add extra services on the Zielona Góra–Żary route. The second vehicle, SA133-006, delivered on 30 June 2007, replaced older rolling stock on some routes and was also used to increase service frequency on the Krzyż–Gorzów Wielkopolski–Kostrzyn route. The third Lubusz 218Mc, SA133-007, delivered on 10 September 2007, enabled an increase in service frequency on the Tuplice–Żary–Żagań–Szprotawa–Niegosławice route and the introduction of a new direct connection from Zielona Góra to Jelenia Góra via Żary and Iłowa. The last DMU from this order (SA133-008) was received on 20 February 2008, and was deployed on the Krzyż–Gorzów Wielkopolski–Kostrzyn route.

On 14 October 2010, a new contract was signed for the delivery of two 218Md units for the Lubusz Voivodeship by Pesa. These new DMUs were ordered to complement the fleet serving the Krzyż–Gorzów Wielkopolski–Kostrzyn route. The vehicles were put into service on March 17 (SA134-020) and March 30 (SA134-021), 2011.

On 1 January 2014, a fire broke out in the heating channel insulation under the SA133-007 while it was operating on the Gorzów Wielkopolski–Drezdenko route near the town of Santok. The vehicle was returned to service on January 6.

=== Lesser Poland Voivodeship ===
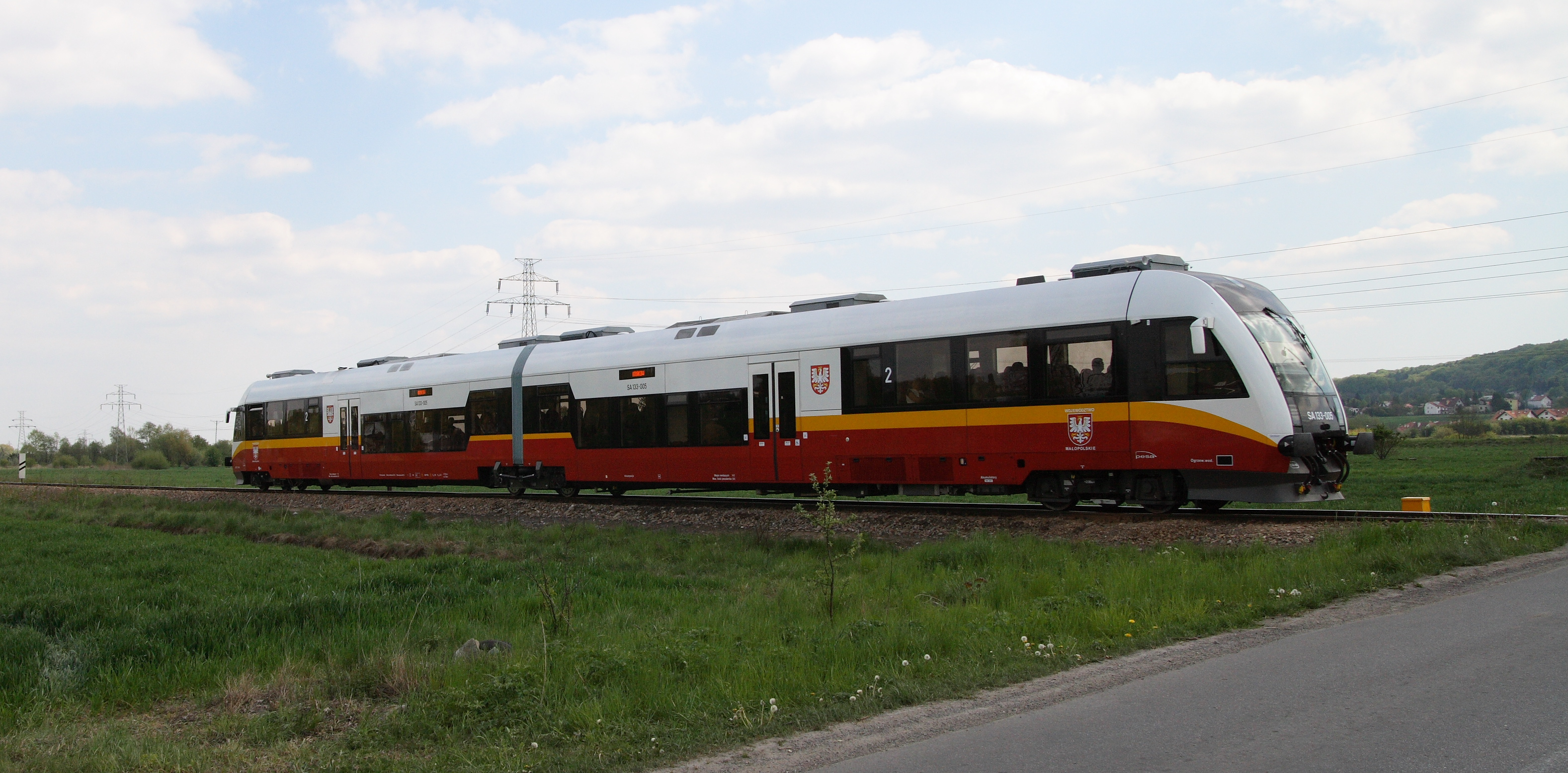
Lesser Poland SA133-005

On 6 July 2006, an agreement was signed between the Lesser Poland Voivodeship and the companies Pesa and BRE Leasing for the delivery of two 218Mc type vehicles and four 308B type vehicles under an operating lease. The first of the ordered 218Mc units for Lesser Poland, designated SA133-004, was officially presented on 21 February 2007 at Kraków Główny railway station. On March 2, it began servicing the line to Kraków John Paul II International Airport. In 2014, due to the electrification of the airport line, all Lesser Poland SA133 units, along with SA109, were leased to the Pomeranian division of Polregio.

By mid-2016, the 10-year leasing period for the SA133 units ended, and the voivodeship exercised the option to purchase them outright.

On 21 February 2017, one of the Lesser Poland units being used by the Pomeranian division was temporarily leased to Szybka Kolej Miejska in Tricity to operate on the Gdańsk Wrzeszcz–Gdańsk Osowa railway.

=== Opole Voivodeship ===
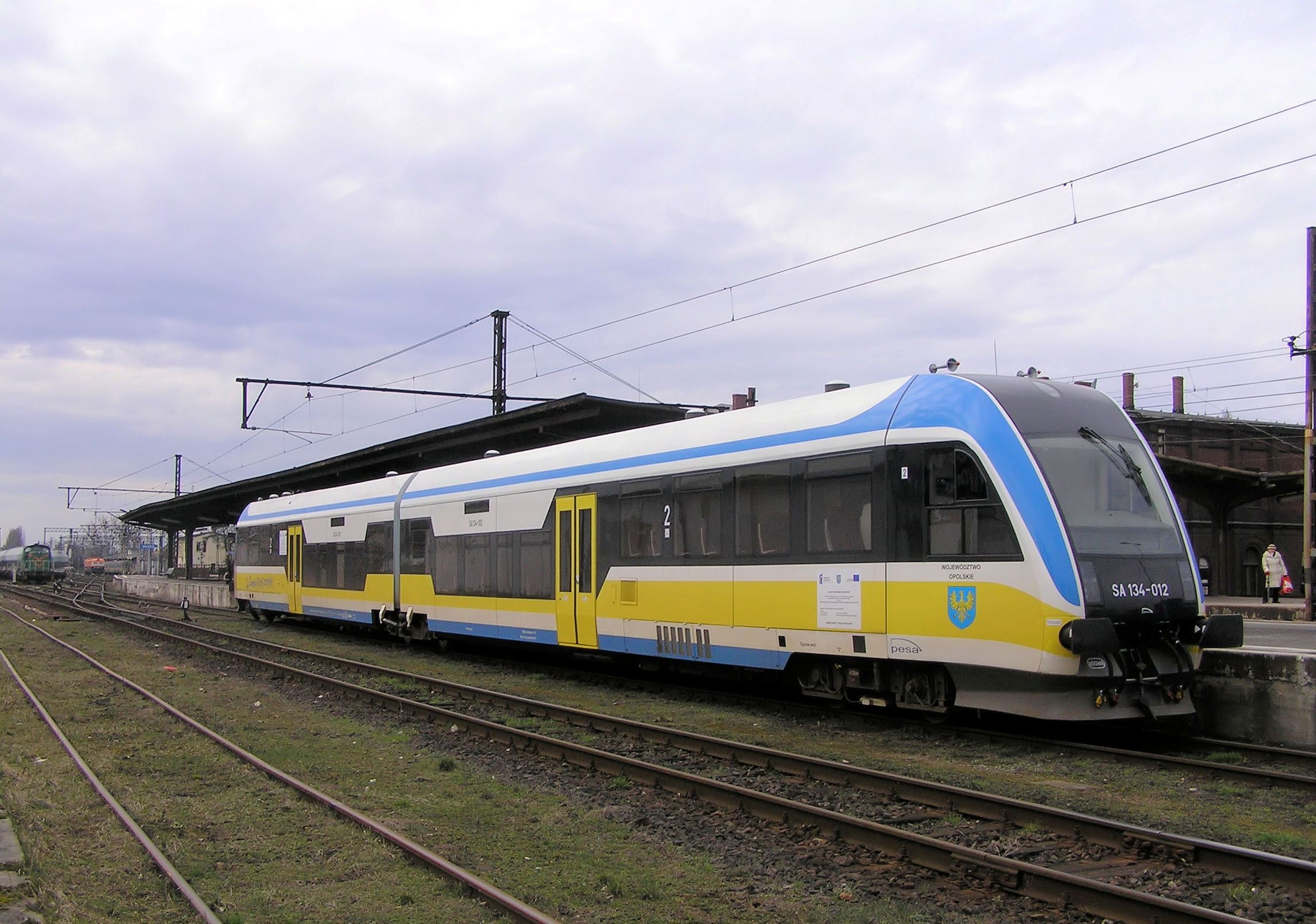
Opole SA134-012 (2009)

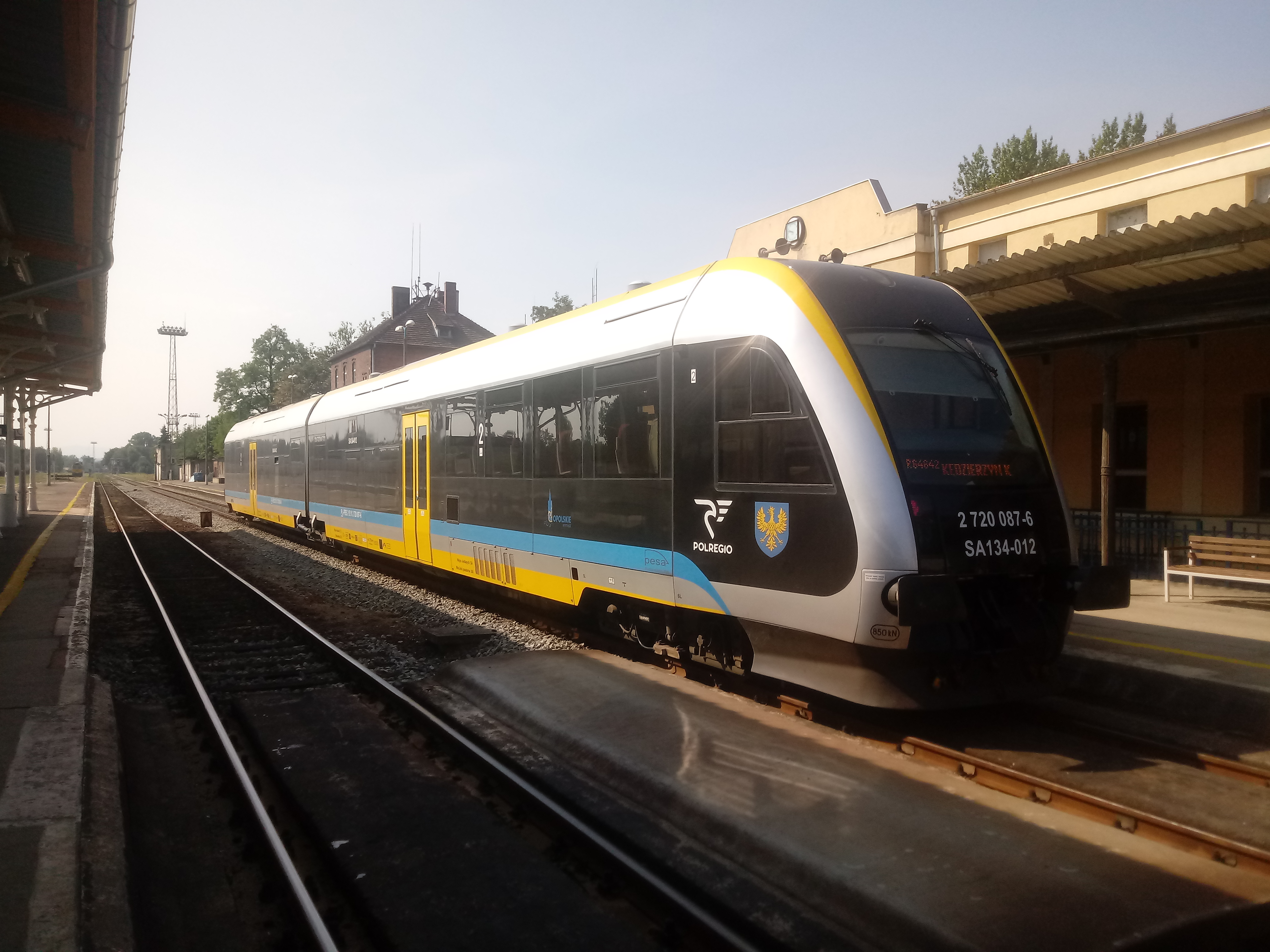
Opole SA134-012 (2018)

A contract for the delivery of five 218Md units was signed on 9 July 2008. The first vehicle was delivered on 16 December 2008, and the last one on 29 September 2009. On the same day, there was a ceremonial presentation of the SA134 unit at Opole Główne railway station, followed by a ride to Lewin Brzeski railway station, where the ceremony continued. The new vehicles were intended to serve connections between Kędzierzyn-Koźle–Nysa–Brzeg, Opole–Nysa, and Opole–Kluczbork.

On 22 December 2015, the SA134-011 derailed near Komprachcice due to a broken frame, causing one axle of the bogie to come off the track. After the incident, Polregio decided to withdraw all units of this type, initially replacing them with buses and later with a substitute train consisting of an SU42 locomotive and double-deck cars. In early February, the operator decided to replace the bogies in all five SA134 units, and by April 14, the trains returned to the Kluczbork–Opole route. On 7 April 2017, another crack was detected during an inspection of the SA134-014 unit.

=== Subcarpathian Voivodeship ===
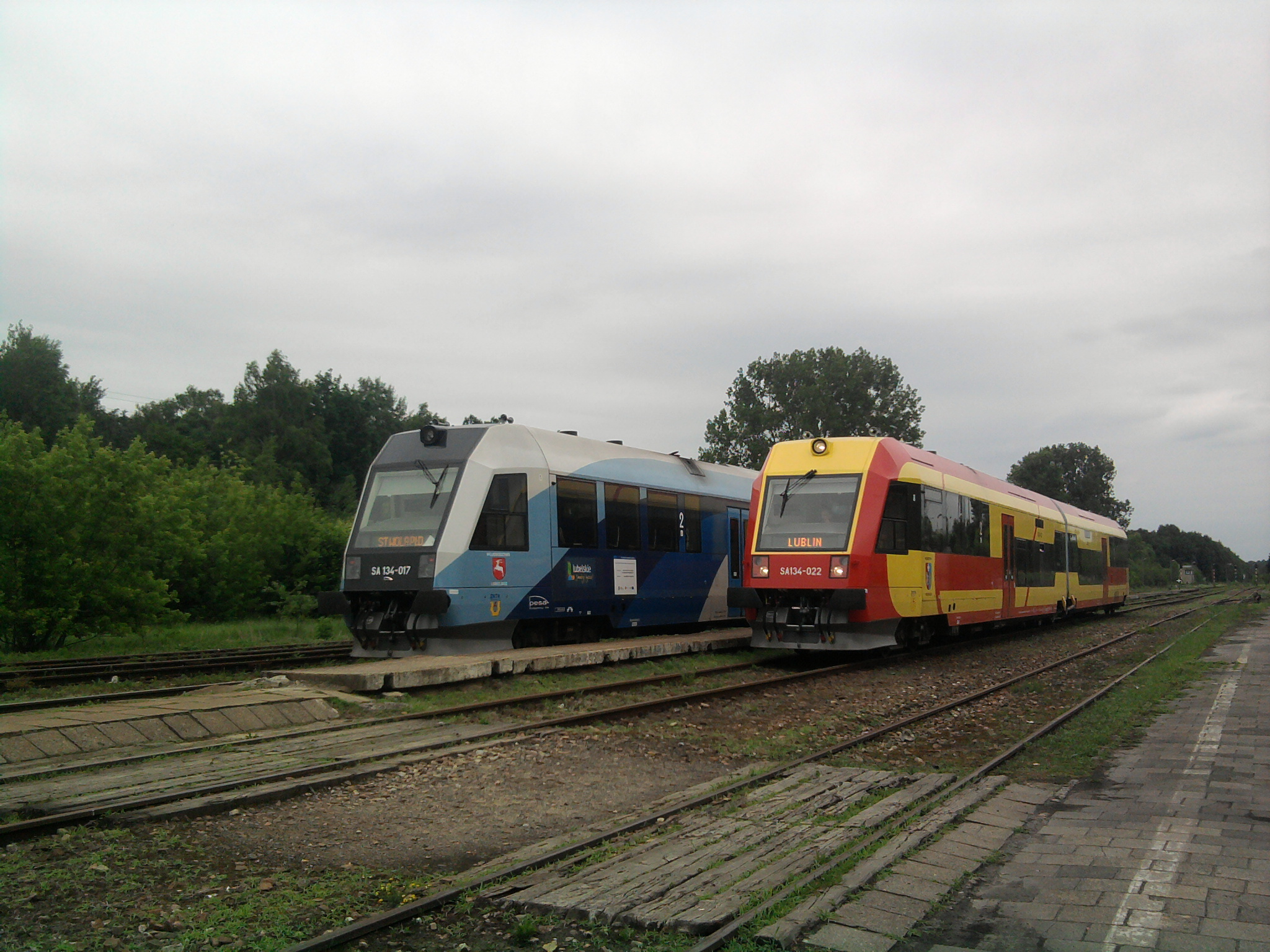
SA134-022 (on the right)

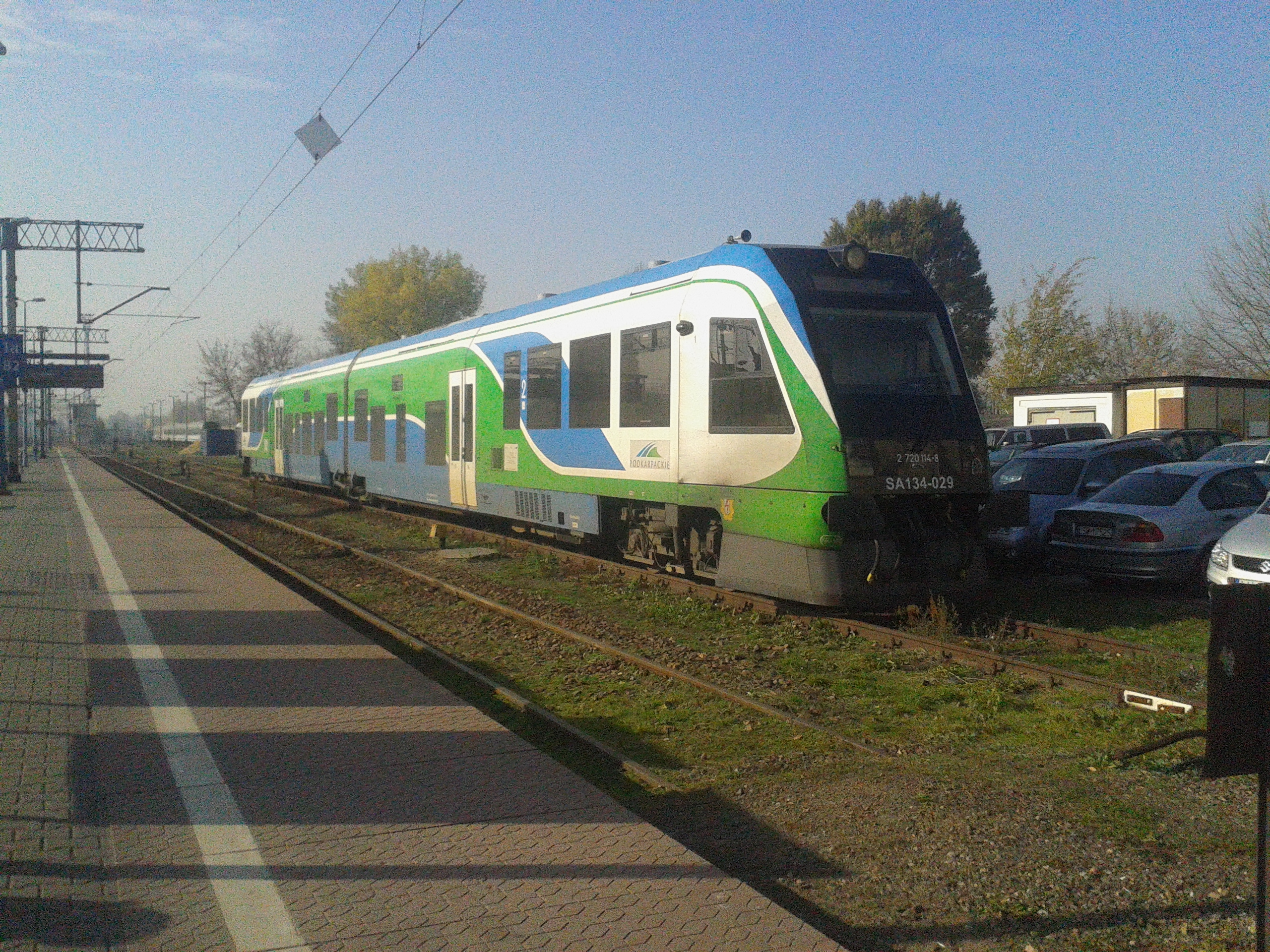
SA134-029

On 19 October 2010, the Subcarpathian Voivodeship signed a contract with Pesa for the delivery of one 218M unit, which was designated as SA134-022 and delivered in March 2011. In the first half of 2011, Pesa also delivered five single-car SA135 units. The delivery of these six new vehicles reduced the frequency of substitute bus services and allowed for the launch of direct connections between Rzeszów–Lublin and Rzeszów–Stalowa Wola.

On 21 August 2013, a contract was signed for the delivery of another diesel multiple unit by a Pesa consortium. On 4 March 2014, the second Subcarpathian 218M unit, designated SA134-029, began service on the same routes as the first 218M unit.

The SA134-022 unit received approval to operate on the Slovak railway network, which allowed it to be used for a special service on the Rzeszów–Medzilaborce route on 27 August 2016. In February 2017, the unit received permanent approval for operation on the Slovak network.

=== Podlaskie Voivodeship ===
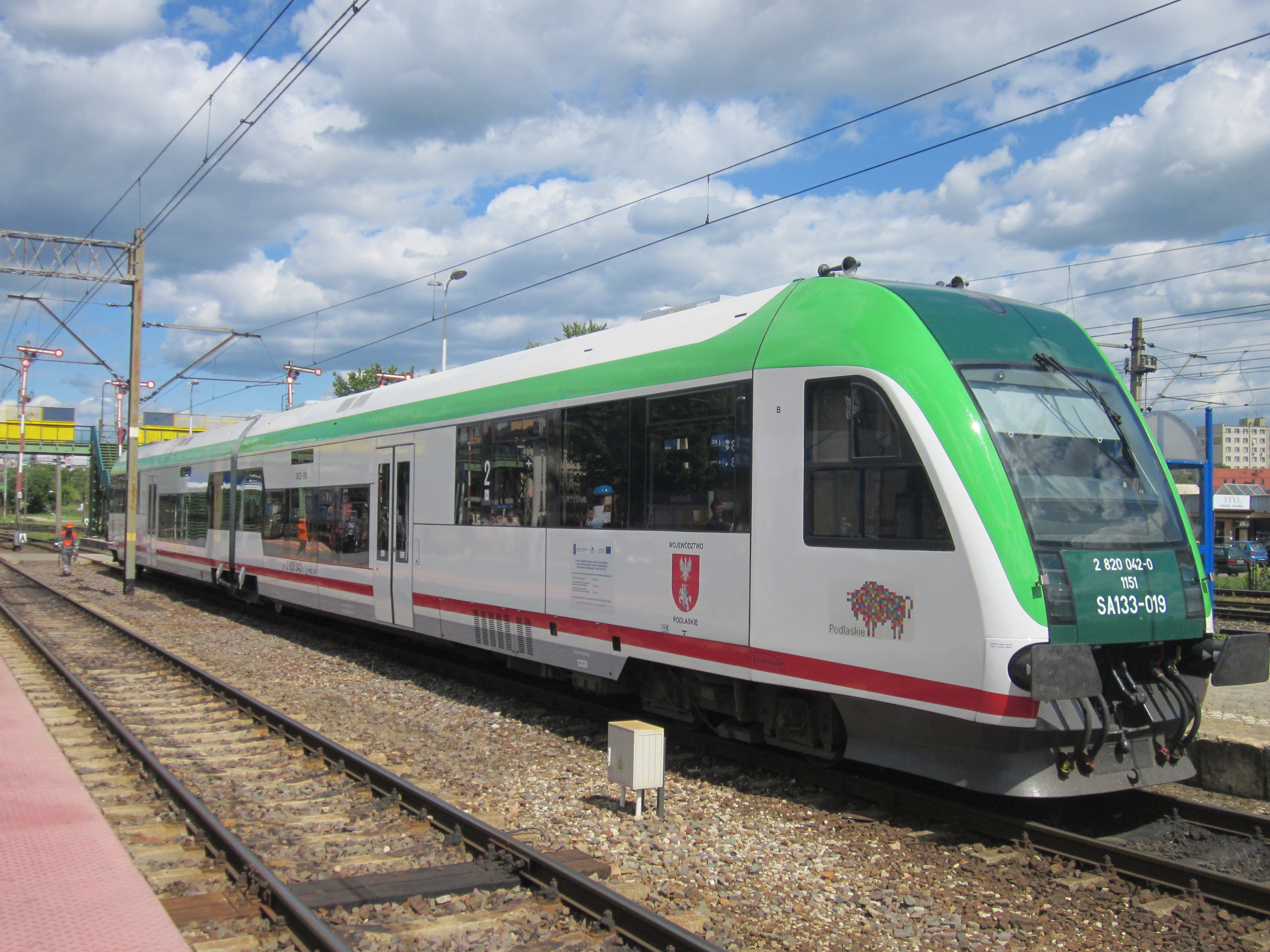
Podlaskie SA133-019

On 28 June 2006, Pesa signed a contract with the Podlaskie Voivodeship for the delivery of two 218Mc units. The first of these (SA133-001) was delivered on October 4, and the second (SA133-002) on November 11. These vehicles were intended to serve the route from Białystok to Suwałki.

On 4 March 2009, another contract was signed with Pesa for the delivery of four more 218Mc trainsets. The first of these ordered railcars was delivered on 31 May 2009, with subsequent vehicles arriving in Białystok on June 30 and July 24. The last vehicle from this order was delivered by the manufacturer on 2 September 2009. The purchases were co-financed by the Regional Operational Programme of the Podlaskie Voivodeship.

The third order for two-car DMUs from Pesa for Podlaskie Voivodeship included two 218Mc vehicles. The contract for the delivery of these vehicles in January 2011 was signed on 26 November 2010 in Białystok.

On 5 May 2016, a technical run of two connected SA133 units to Kaunas, Lithuania, took place. The reason for the run was preparations for the launch of the cross-border service Białystok–Kaunas. This connection was officially launched on June 17.

=== Pomeranian Voivodeship ===
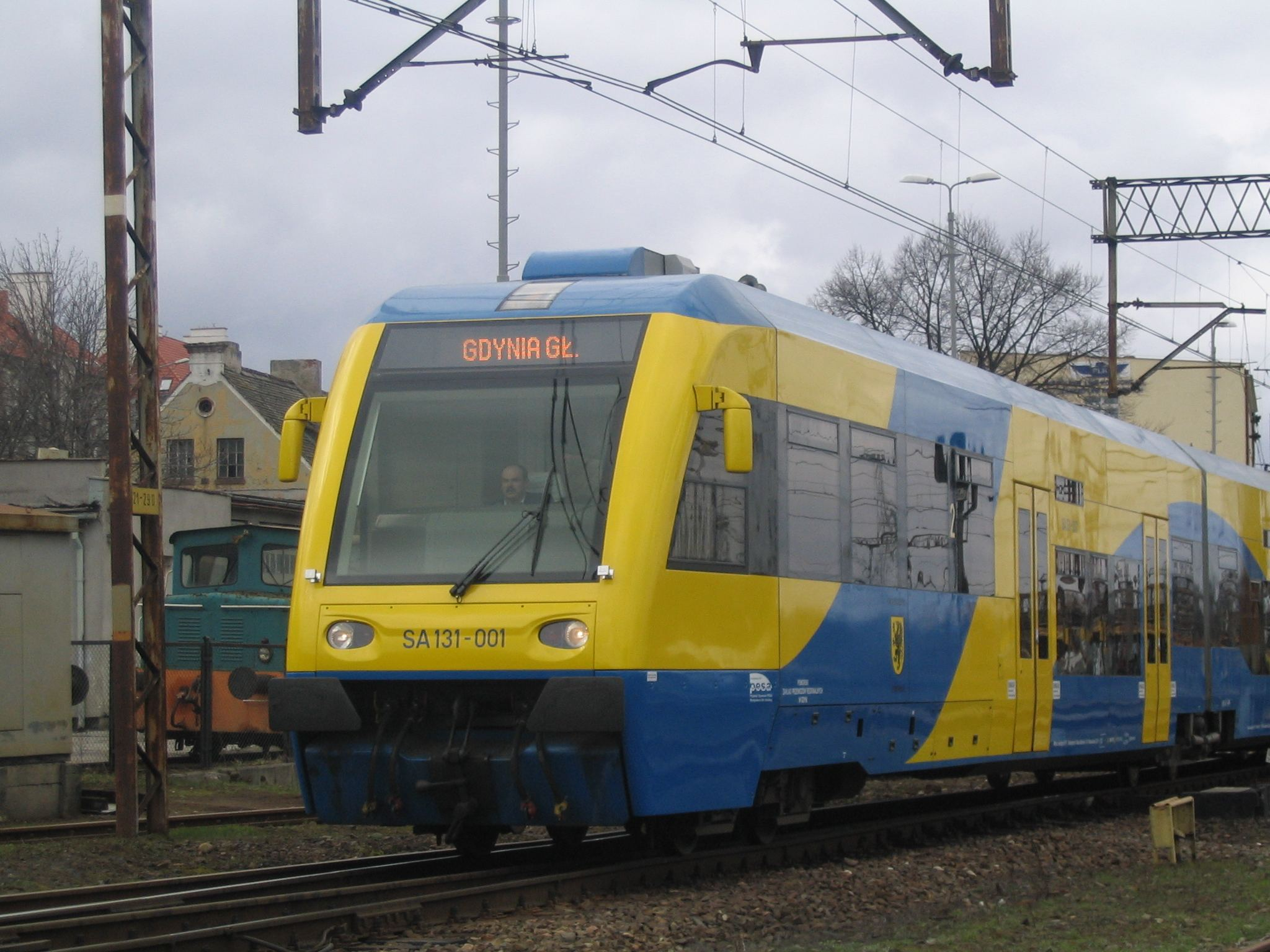
Pomeranian SA131-001

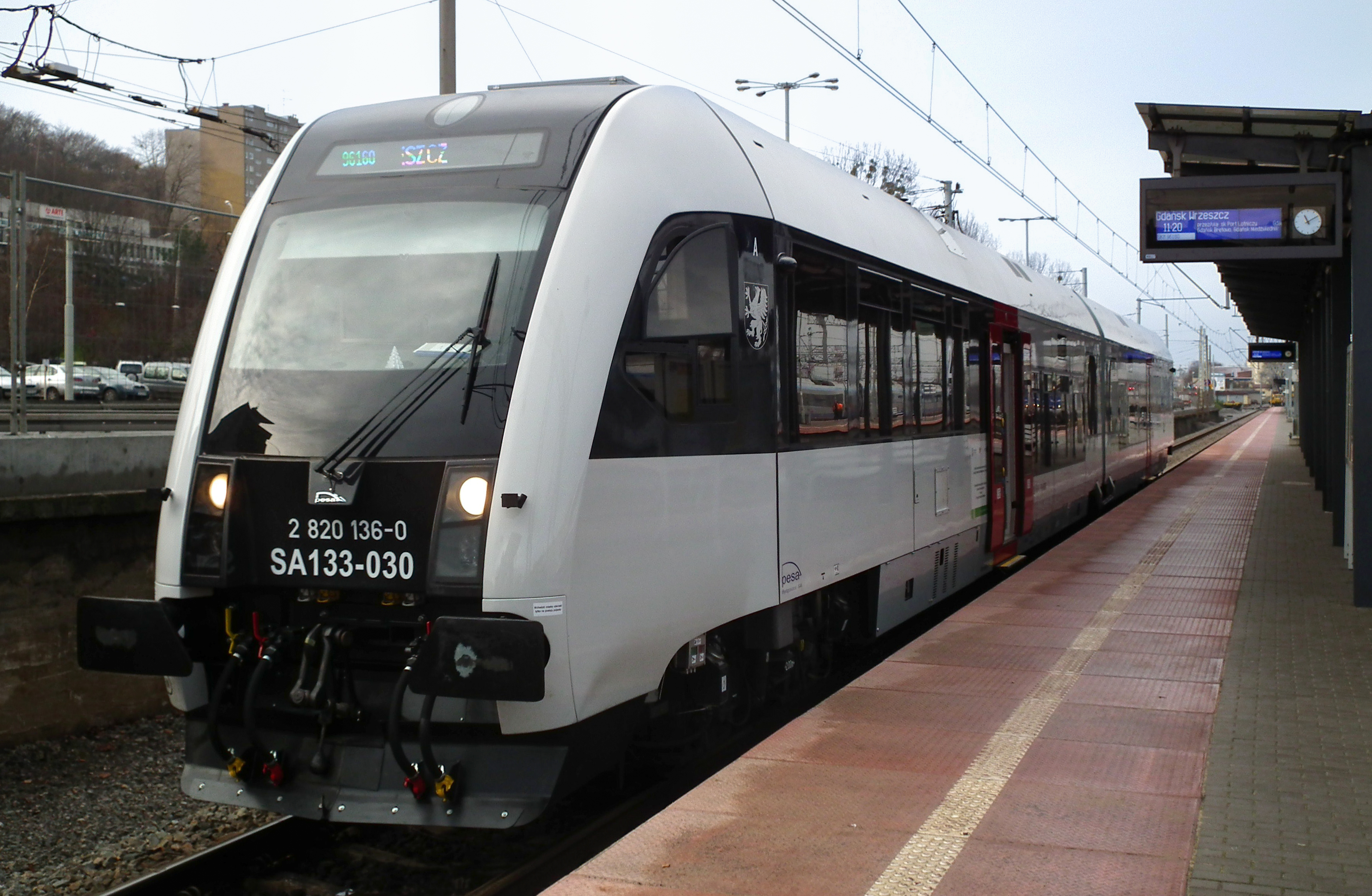
SA133-030 servicing the Gdańsk Wrzeszcz–Gdańsk Osowa railway

On 7 December 2004, Pesa signed its first contract with the Pomeranian Voivodeship for the delivery of a 218M series vehicle. As part of this order, the voivodeship also ordered two single-car 214M units. On 4 December 2005, the vehicle was delivered to Gdynia and was sent for testing on various non-electrified routes in the Pomeranian Voivodeship, as well as on routes from Czersk and Chojnice to Laskowice Pomorskie. In December 2005, it began service on Pomeranian tracks, operating routes such as Gdynia–Hel and Gdynia–Kościerzyna. The new trainset joined previously operated vehicles in this voivodeship, including the SA101, SA103 (Pesa 214Ma), and SA109 (Kolzam RegioVan). With a larger capacity, it was intended to improve travel comfort on sections with high passenger demand.

On 30 May 2006, Pomeranian Voivodeship signed a contract for three more 218Mb DMUs. The SA132 series vehicles (numbers 005, 006, and 007) were delivered between October and December 2006. Due to funding from SPOT, the new trainsets could only be used on routes Gdynia–Władysławowo–Hel and Gdynia–Kościerzyna–Chojnice.

The two-car trainsets were too small to handle the connections between Gdynia–Kościerzyna and Gdynia–Hel. The regional government announced a tender for more spacious trainsets. New three-car DMUs produced by Newag (221M series SA138) replaced the previously used vehicles. The vehicles from Bydgoszcz were redirected to other lines.

On 24 April 2014, the regional government signed a contract with Pesa for the delivery of four SA133 units (type 218Mc). The first vehicle was delivered at the end of July 2015, and on September 3, it was presented at the Malbork railway station. In September, all four vehicles began operating on the Malbork–Grudziądz line. The purchase was co-financed under the Swiss Cooperation Program with the new EU member states.

On 2 September 2014, the Pomeranian regional government signed a contract with Pesa for the delivery of three 218Mc units and seven three-car DMUs of type 219M for the Gdańsk Wrzeszcz–Gdańsk Osowa railway. Deliveries were to start in December 2014 and end in May 2015. However, due to annexes to the contract, the delivery time was shifted to the period from April 20 to August 31, 2015. In exchange for the delay in contract execution, the manufacturer equipped the units with supercapacitors and retractable external steps. In April 2015, the first three-car unit was ready and had received certification. The Gdańsk Wrzeszcz–Gdańsk Osowa railway was launched on 1 September 2015, operated by the Szybka Kolej Miejska in Tricity. Shortly before the railway launch, the vehicles were used by Polregio and operated other lines in the voivodeship. All 10 units to service the Gdańsk Wrzeszcz–Gdańsk Osowa railway were delivered by December. In December 2022, the operation of the line, along with the dedicated diesel rolling stock, was taken over by Polregio.

=== Warmian-Masurian Voivodeship ===
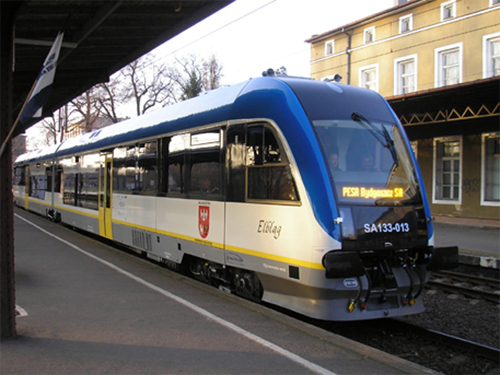
Warmian-Masurian SA133-013

On 24 April 2009, the first contract was signed for the delivery of three DMUs of type 218Mc. The ceremonial handover of the first 218Mc took place on 30 November 2009 in Elbląg, the second was handed over on January 5 in Ełk, and the third on 6 January 2010 in Olsztyn. These vehicles were purchased to service connections from Olsztyn to Elbląg, Ełk, and Pisz.

A second contract with Pesa also included the delivery of three 218Mc vehicles. The contract for this order, financed through an operating lease, was signed on 20 May 2010. All units were delivered by the end of 2010. They were introduced to work alongside the three previously purchased 218Mc units, including servicing connections on the reactivated routes Olsztyn–Pisz–Ełk and Braniewo–Bogaczewo–Elbląg. The vehicles from the new delivery did not fully meet the voivodeship's demand for this capacity of rolling stock. On the tracks of Warmia and Masuria, single-car 214M units with attached Bh-series carriages could still be seen.

On 21 January 2016, the Olsztyn–Szymany Airport connection was launched, serviced by SA133 and SA106 vehicles owned by the voivodeship.

=== Greater Poland Voivodeship ===
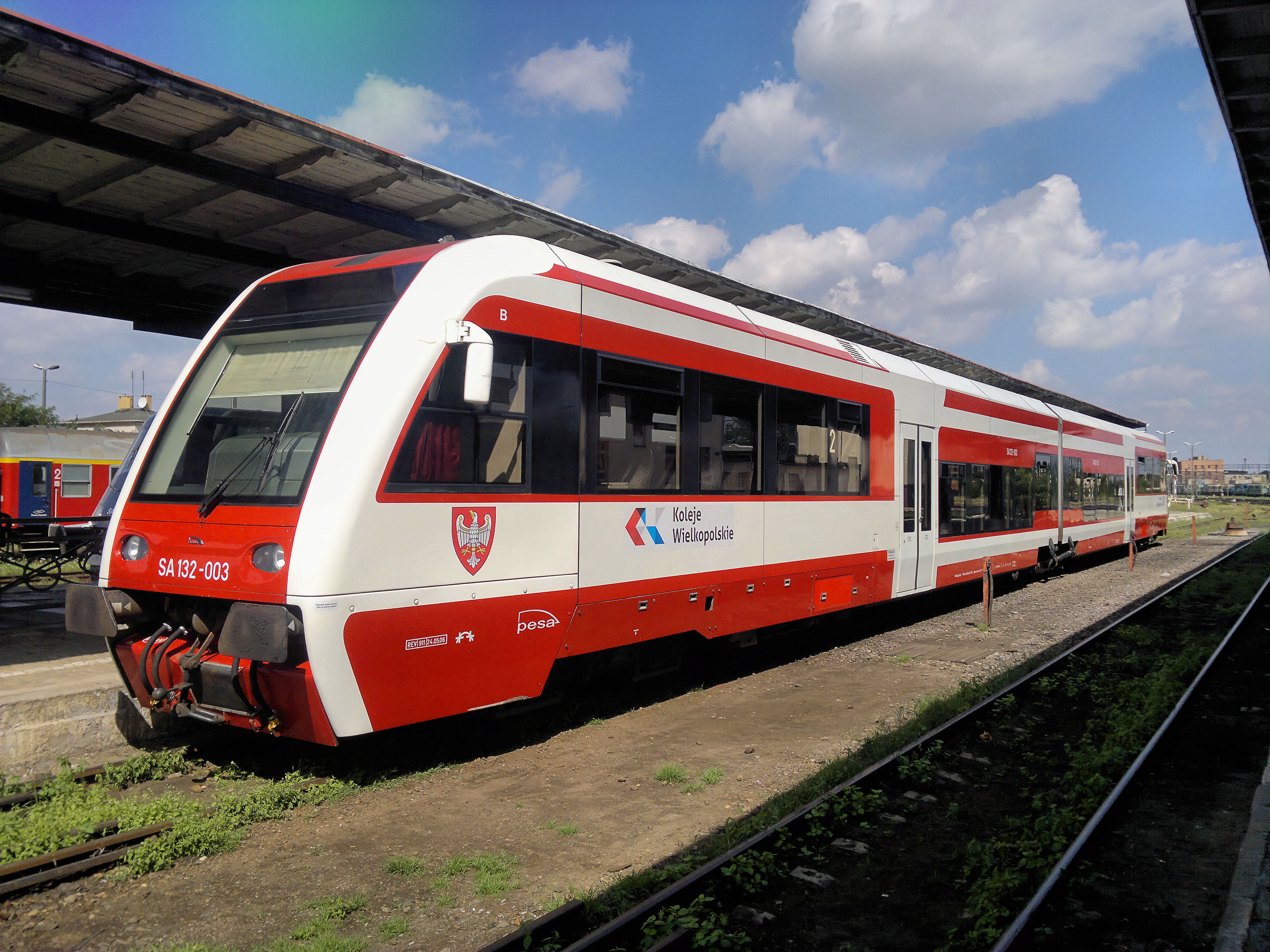
Greater Poland SA132-003

On 10 May 2005, Pesa signed a contract with the Greater Poland Voivodeship for the delivery of one SA132 unit, which was delivered on 22 December 2005. Being larger than the rail buses already owned by the voivodeship, this unit was deployed on the most heavily trafficked lines serviced by diesel trains, including the route to Wągrowiec.

On 29 March 2006, representatives of the Greater Poland Marshal's Office signed a contract with Pesa for the delivery of two 218Ma vehicles. The contract specified a four-month delivery period. The first of these units (SA132-003) was ceremoniously handed over on 31 May 2006 at Poznań Główny railway station.

On 22 December 2006, a contract was signed at the Marshal's Office in Poznań for the delivery of eight more vehicles of this type. The first of these (SA132-008) was handed over for operation on 15 March 2007, and the last (SA132-015) on 27 November 2007. The purchase of these vehicles was co-financed (about 40% of the order value) by the Sectoral Operational Program Transport.

On 24 July 2008, a contract was signed at the Marshal's Office in Poznań for Pesa to deliver two 218Md trainsets. Both vehicles were handed over for use in December 2008.

On 12 February 2013, in Czerwonak, an SA132-010 unit collided with a delivery truck, causing the suspension of service on Poznań Wschód–Bydgoszcz Główna railway between Czerwonak and Owińska for several hours. On 8 March the SA134-010 operating on the Gołańcz–Poznań route also collided with a car. Due to these incidents, the operator was forced to rent an SU42 locomotive along with a Bmnopux carriage from Polregio.

On 19 April 2016, in Karolewo, on the Poznań–Wągrowiec route, SA132-003 collided with a truck that had stopped on a railway crossing. Fortunately, there were no casualties; the train driver initiated an emergency brake three seconds before the impact and ran through the passenger compartment, instructing passengers to lie on the floor (a video of the incident later went viral on the Internet).

On 29 April 2020, the SA132-012 unit collided with a tractor-trailer at a railway crossing in Bolechowo. The truck driver had not stopped at the crossing despite the lowered barriers and signals indicating an approaching train. As a result of the accident, one of the cabs was destroyed, and the vehicle suffered significant damage, leading the Marshal's Office of the Greater Poland Voivodeship to decide not to repair the vehicle. Instead, the voivodeship purchased a second-hand Link train, which had previously operated with Greater Poland Railways.

== Awards and recognitions ==
- 2006 – awarded the title Good Design in the public sphere category by the Industrial Design Institute.
