= Pesa Dart =

Class of Polish electric train

Dart
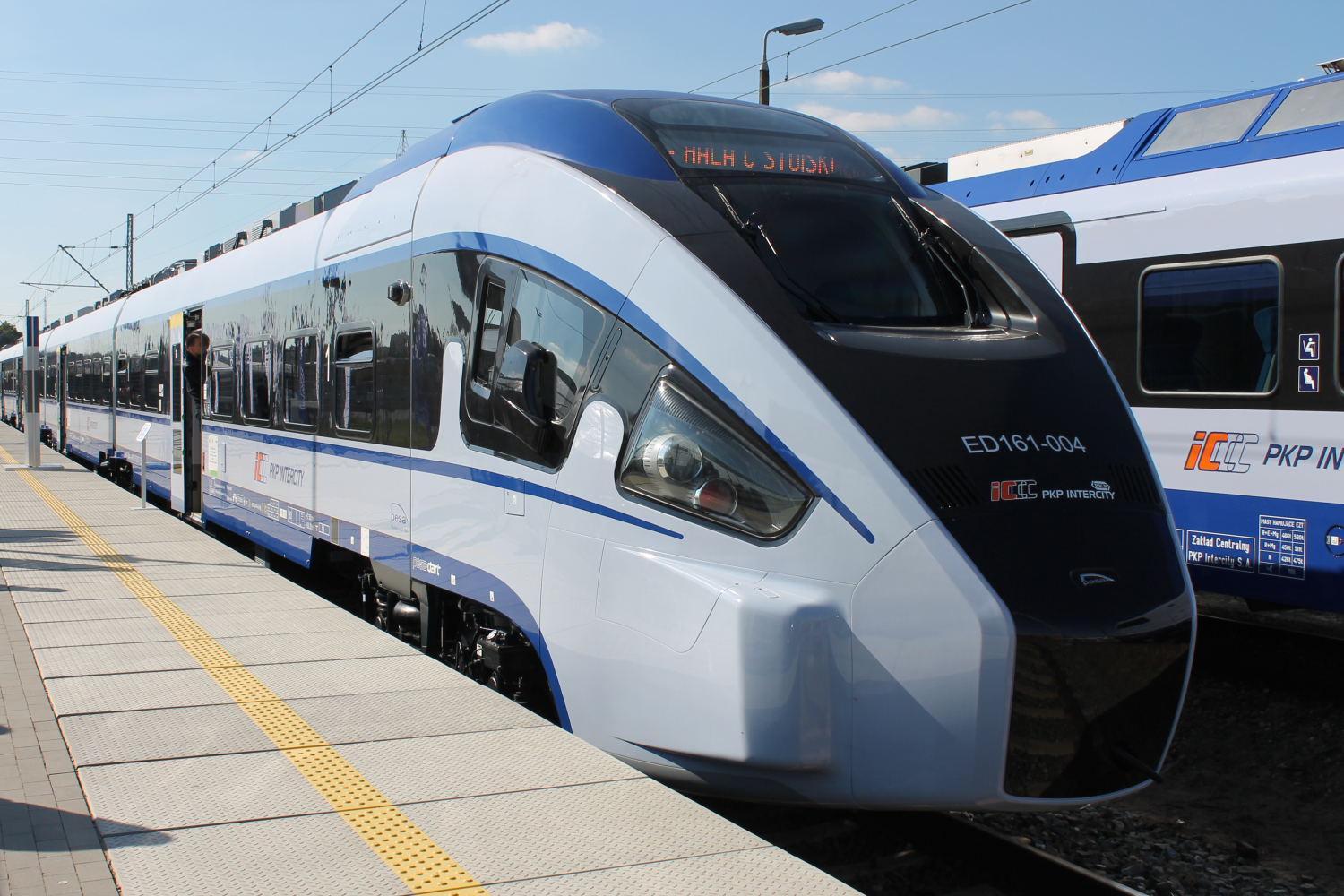
- ED161 of PKP Intercity
- Manufacturer: Pesa SA
- Family name: Dart
- Constructed: 2014–2016
- Entered service: 2015
- Number built: 20
- Fleet numbers: ED161
- Operator: PKP Intercity

Specifications
- Train length: 150,230 mm (492 ft 11 in)
- Width: 2,880 mm (9 ft 5 in)
- Height: 4,300 mm (14 ft 1 in)
- Platform height: 760 mm (2 ft 6 in)
- Maximum speed: Majority: 160 km/h (100 mph); Design: 200 km/h (125 mph)
- Weight: 395 t
- Traction system: electric
- Traction motors: 6 x 400 kW
- Power output: 2400 kW
- Acceleration: around 0,6 m/s^{2}
- Electric system: 3 kV DC
- Current collection: pantograph
- Coupling system: Scharfenberg
- Multiple working: yes, up to 2 units
- Track gauge: 1,435 mm (4 ft 8 1/2 in) standard gauge

The Dart (Manufacturer designation 43WE, stylized as PesaDART.) is a long distance electric multiple unit developed by Polish rolling-stock manufacturer Pesa SA. PKP Intercity operates 20 Dart units, which are designated as PKP Class ED161.

== History ==
=== Origin ===
Pesa has been developing electric multiple units since 2004, when the Pesa Mazovia for Warszawska Kolej Dojazdowa was built. In 2006 the Acatus was introduced, which was later developed into a series of 14 Bydgostia units, first ordered by Przewozy Regionalne and now operated by PKP Intercity. In 2010, the first 4-section Elf was introduced, which became the basis of a new family of EMUs. In the later years, the Elf family expanded to include 2-, 3-, 4- and 6-section EMUs for operation on metropolitan and regional services. The manufacturer also planned other variant of the Elf, including an 8-section long distance unit. This version was never developed into a prototype, since Pesa decided to offer PKP Intercity a vehicle from the new Dart family

=== Development ===
The development of the Dart was partially funded by the National Centre for Research and Development, which provided Pesa with a 7 million PLN subsidy in April 2014, to create a prototype of the new unit. On May 24, 2014, PKP Intercity signed a contract with Pesa for the delivery and 15-year maintenance of 20 Dart units. The exterior and interior of the trainsets were designed by Bartosz Piotrowski. Jakub Gołębiewski also worked on the interior, while Mariusz Gorczyński designed the driver's cabin. Miłosz Pszczóliński and the Kaniewski Design firm also worked on creating the Dart. The prototype was scheduled to be ready by the end of 2014. That was however affected by a delay and the first Dart was completed in May 2015. The first trainset was tested on a local line near Bydgoszcz, where it reached its top speed of 160 km/h. On May 23, 2015, it was transferred to the Test Track Centre near Żmigród, where the homologation testing began. On May 30, during testing on the Central Rail Line, the train reached 204 km/h. The Dart was officially presented to the public during the Trako 2015 trade fair on September 22. The first Dart was approved for service by the Railway Transport Office on October 30, 2015. PKP Intercity received its first unit on December 2, 2015. The 20th, final unit, was delivered on March 5, 2016. On November 16, 2016, the ED161 was certified to for operation with ETCS level 2.

== Design ==
=== Body ===
The body is made out of high-strength steel and compsite materials, it meets the requirements of the EN 15227 norm (Four collision scenarios). The safety equipment consists of a cowcatcher, a safety cage around the driver's cabin, a honeycomb-shaped aluminum block in the front of the trainset and multiple energy absorbers. The ED161 consists of 8 sections, with 90 cm wide doors in the middle of each section of the EMU.

=== Interior ===
The interior of the Dart is separated into sections: Corridors, first and second class, a bar section and a crew compartment. The floor is flat on the entire length of the train, staying at the width of 1220 mm (Except the regions near the doors, where it descends to 760 mm). The train is disabled-friendly, featuring a lift, designated wheelchair spots and an accessible toilet.

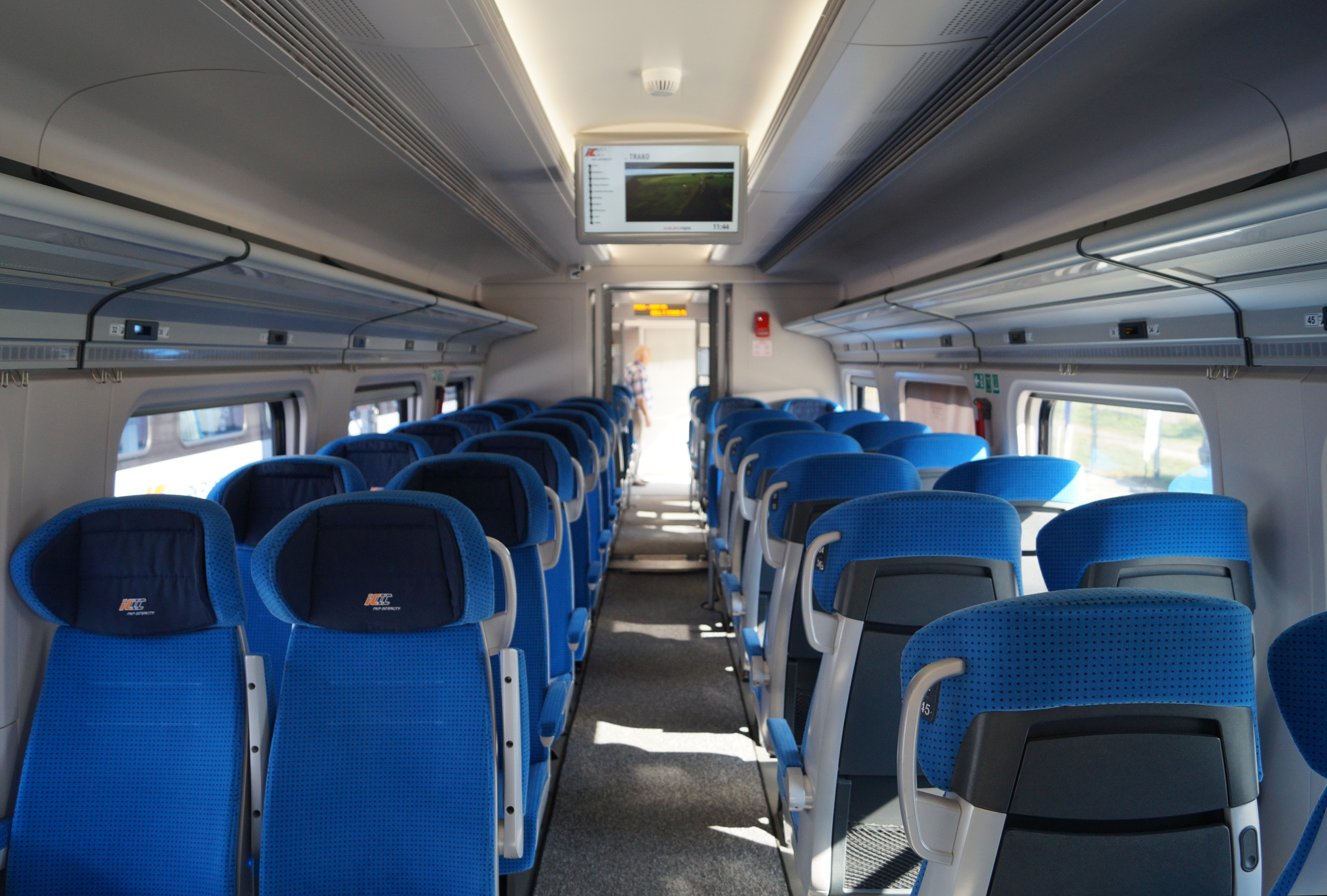
Second class

The second class features 292 seats in a 2+2 configuration, while first class features 60 seats in a 2+1 configuration. The restaurant section features single-seat tables and one 4-seat tables. Food delivery from the restaurant section directly to the passenger seats is also available. The crew compartment features a bed and a bathroom with a shower.

The Dart features a bicycle rack with space for six bikes, luggage space, 7 toilets (One for the crew and six available to the passengers, including a wheelchair-accessible one). The train is equipped with air conditioning, electrical sockets under the seats, Wi-Fi, video surveillance and electronic route displays.

=== Drivetrain and equipment ===
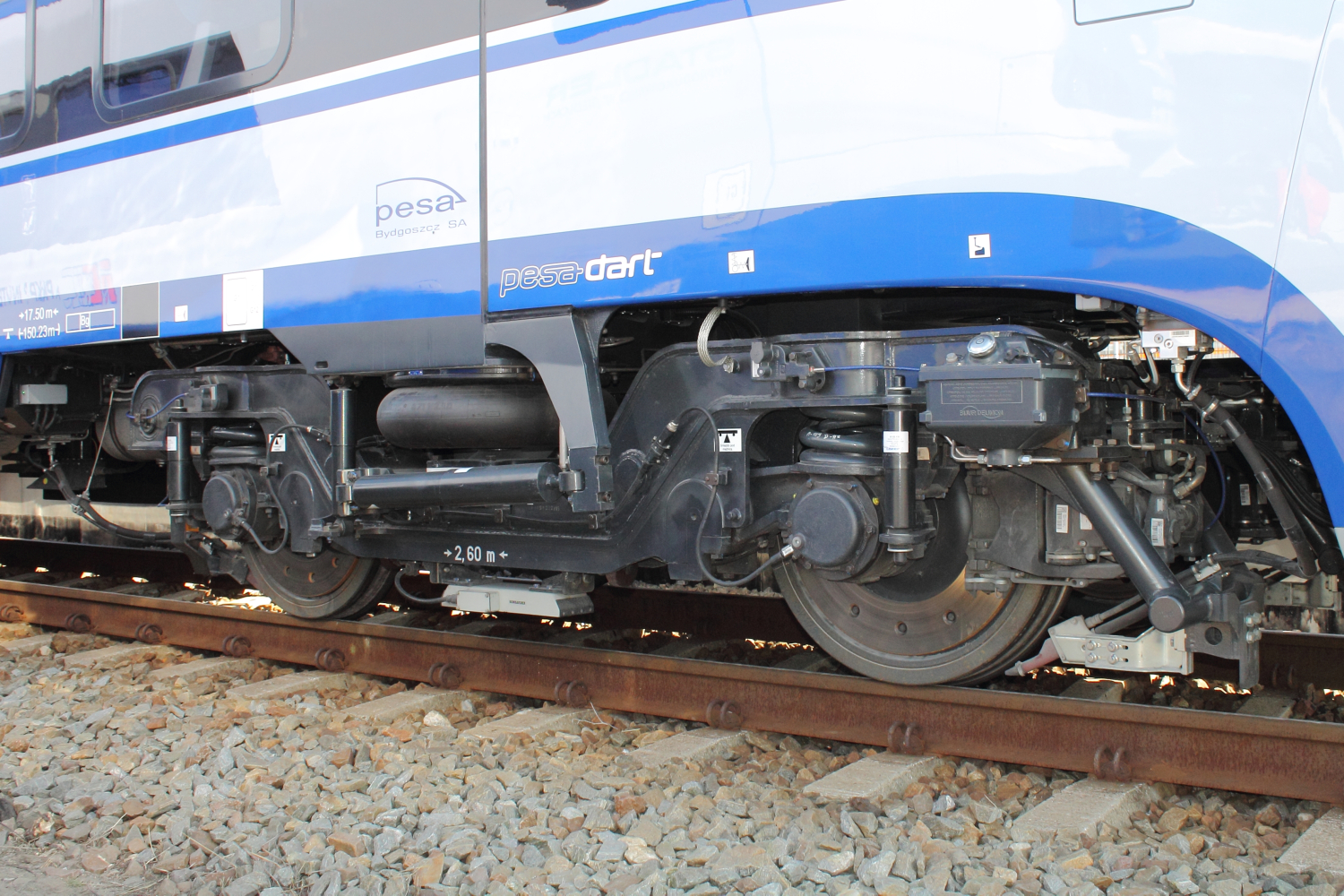
39MN power bogie in the front section of ED161-004

The Dart features 9 bogies. Much like the Swiss Stadler FLIRT, the Dart utilises Jacobs bogies, which means the coaches share one bogie each, instead of being built with two in the traditional fashion. The ones at the front are 39MN-type power bogies, while the middle ones unpowered. The third bogie is a 40MN-type power bogie. The rest are 40MNT-type trailer bogies. The drivetrain consists of 6 x 400 kW traction motors, providing 2400 kW of power in total.

The trains built for PKP Intercity are certified for operation at a top speed of 160 km/h, but the manufacturer says that the Dart family can be adapted for speeds of up to 230 km/h. While one of the units for PKP IC did reach 204 km/h during testing, this does not mean it is suitable for operation at speeds above 160 km/h, mostly because of the reduced amount of power bogies and the underpowered power inverters. The vehicles are equipped with ERTMS level 2 and support multiple working of up to two units

== Service ==
PKP Intercity ordered 20 ED161 units together with a 15-year maintenance package. The vehicles were ordered to serve connections from Warsaw to: Wrocław (Via Łódź, some services extended towards Jelenia Góra), Bielsko-Biała (Some services extended towards Wisła and Zakopane possible), Lublin (Some services extended towards Chełm) and Białystok. The first units were scheduled to start operating with the inauguration of the new timetable in December 2015.

In September 2015, the construction of a new maintenance depot for the Darts in Mińsk Mazowiecki was completed.

At the beginning of December 2015, the operator informed that the new fleet of long-distance EMUs will not enter service with the new timetable on December 13, 2015. In mid-December, it was reported that the Darts might start operating until the end of the year.

The Dart entered service on December 29, 2015, on the Warszawa Zachodnia-Lublin service. The next day, the Dart started operating on the route to Białystok. On January 9, 2016, the ED161 started operating the Warszawa Wschodnia-Wisła Głębce and Białystok-Bielsko-Biała. On January 11, the Warszawa Wschodnia-Katowice and Lublin-Katowice services were inaugurated. On January 23, the Dart started operating the Warszawa Wschodnia-Wrocław route. In the first month of service, the new Pesa trains made 247 trips, during which they traveled 69000 km and transported almost 45000 passengers.
