= Pesa Acatus II =

Electric multiple unit of Polish production, manufactured by Pesa

EN77
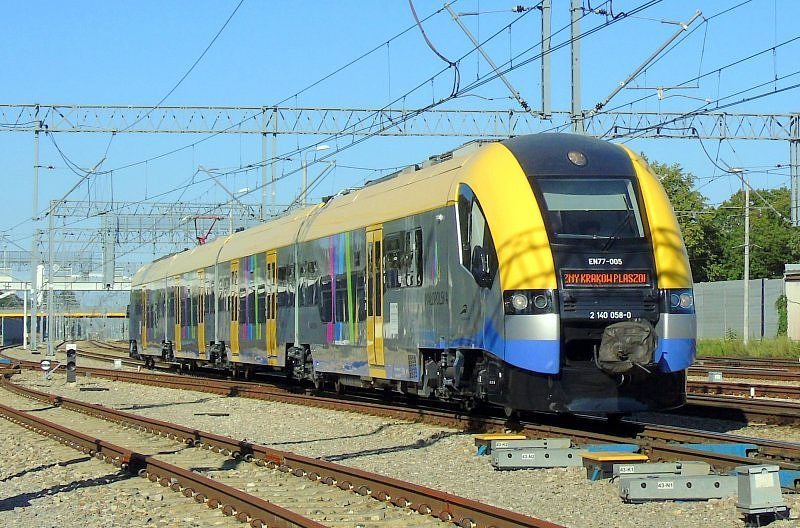
- EN77-005 at the Kraków Zabłocie railway station
- Stock type: electric multiple unit
- Manufacturer: Pesa
- Assembly: Bydgoszcz, Poland
- Capacity: 350

Specifications
- Train length: 75,250 mm (246.88 ft)
- Width: 2,880 mm (9.45 ft)
- Height: 4,280 mm (14.04 ft)
- Platform height: 760 mm (2.49 ft)
- Maximum speed: 160 km/h (100 mph)
- Engine type: asynchronous
- Power output: 3,000 V DC
- Acceleration: 1 m/s^{2} (3.3 ft/s^{2})

The Pesa Acatus II (designated as EN77, type 32WE) is a four-car, partially low-floor electric multiple unit (EMU) manufactured in Poland by Pesa Bydgoszcz between 2010 and 2011. Five units were purchased by the local government of the Lesser Poland Voivodeship. Initially, the vehicles were operated by Polregio, and later by Lesser Poland Railways, which have additionally owned the vehicles since 2018.

== History ==
=== Origins ===
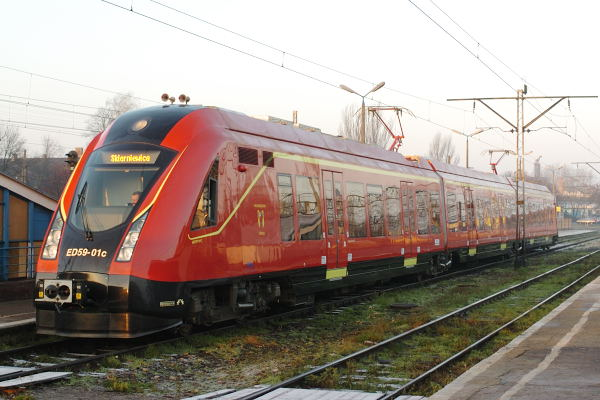
Pesa Acatus (15WE)

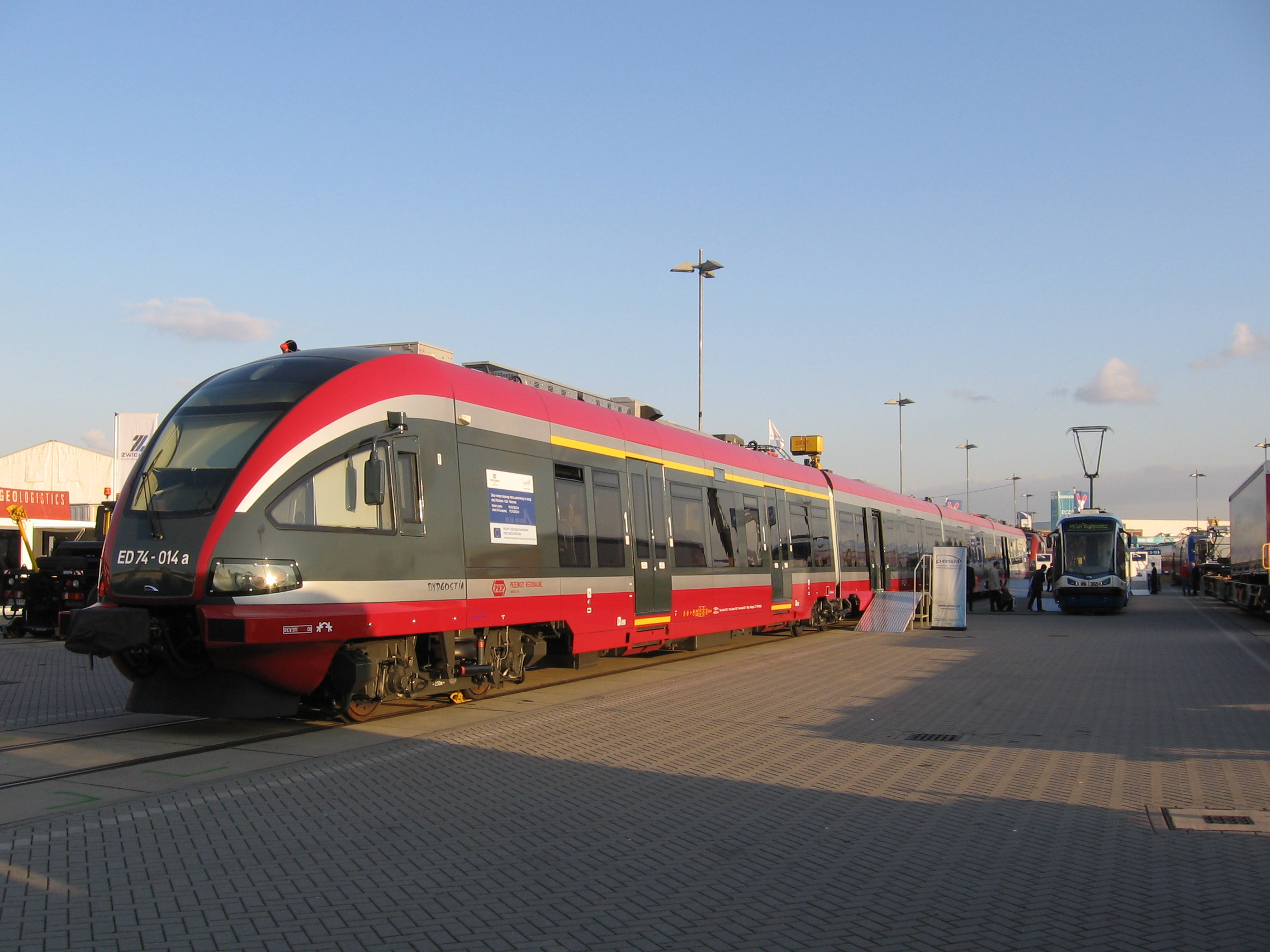
Pesa Bydgostia (16WEk)

After World War II, electric multiple units (EMUs) were produced exclusively by Pafawag from Wrocław until 1997. Pafawag was responsible for producing the widely used EN57 EMU series in Poland. After privatization in the 1990s, Pafawag ceased EMU production, with the last unit being the ED73 in 1997. For several years, no EMUs were produced in Poland.

During this period, Polish State Railways, and later local governments, mainly purchased diesel multiple units (DMUs), as fuel-intensive locomotives dominated the operation of non-electrified lines. This allowed Polish manufacturers and operators to gain experience in the production and operation of lightweight rolling stock. Additionally, the existing EN57 units were modernized by Polish operators.

New manufacturers began producing electric multiple units in 2004. Since then, three companies have been awarded contracts for EMUs: Pesa Bydgoszcz, Newag, and Stadler Rail. After a major restructuring in 1998, Pesa initially (from 2001) focused on producing railbuses. However, in 2004, it embarked on building the first EMUs for the Warsaw Commuter Railway – the 13WE (EN95). Despite plans to purchase 10 units, production ended after one unit. The next EMUs produced were the 15WE (2006) and the 16WEk (2007). In both cases, production ended after one order. One of the reasons for the failure was the high floor (1,000 mm above the railhead), which hindered quick passenger exchange and the increasingly popular transport of bicycles, strollers, and wheelchairs. In Poland (outside the Warsaw metropolitan area and the Tri-City metropolitan area), high platforms were virtually nonexistent and there were no plans to build them, so the introduction of low-floor EMUs became important for those ordering new rolling stock. Pesa Bydgoszcz took this into account when designing the Elf and Acatus II, which are adapted for step-free access to platforms 550/760 mm above the railhead. In 2010, Pesa Bydgoszcz introduced the Acatus II, a modernized low-floor EMU designed for regional transportation. These units were purchased under a European Union-funded program supporting public transportation in the Lesser Poland region.

== Features and Specifications ==
The Acatus II is a four-car, standard-gauge train with a partially low-floor design for improved accessibility.

- Length: 75,250 mm (246.88 ft)
- Width: 2,880 mm (9.45 ft)
- Height: 4,280 mm (14.04 ft)
- Platform Height Compatibility: 760 mm (2.49 ft)
- Max Speed: 160 km/h (99 mph)

The train features Jacobs bogies, which reduce weight and enhance maneuverability, and has asynchronous electric motors powered by a 3,000 V DC system.

=== Successor ===
In 2014, Pesa announced that after a 3-year break (the EN77-005 was delivered in the second quarter of 2011), it intended to develop the Acatus II line by selling Acatus Plus units. Orders for these vehicles were placed by the local governments of the Lesser Poland and Subcarpathian voivodeships.

== Construction ==
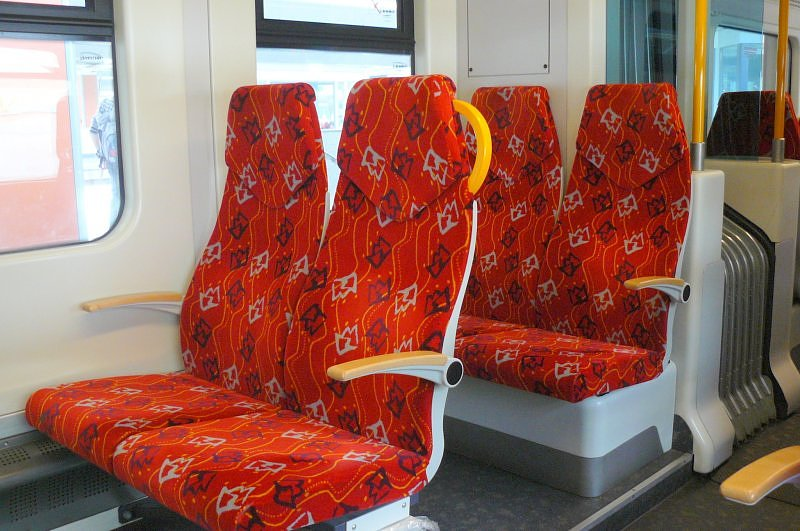
Seats in EN77-002

The Acatus II is a four-car, single-space, partially low-floor train designed for regional passenger transport. Despite its name, it has little connection to the first Acatus.

The middle cars have two pairs of doors on each side, while the end cars have one pair each. All doors are located in the low-floor area, with retractable steps installed underneath to facilitate boarding from platforms lower than 550/760 mm above the railhead. The first and last bogie is a powered 26MN with an axle base of 2,800 mm. The middle bogies are Jacobs 40AN trailer bogies with an axle base of 3,000 mm. Elevated floor areas, accessible by steps or ramps, are located above all bogies. The wheel diameter is 850 mm. Due to the way the cars are connected, shortening or lengthening the vehicle in operational conditions is not possible, but it is possible to couple up to three units in multiple unit operation.

The seating arrangement is mixed: rows and groups. The vehicle has 160+13 seats in second class and 20 in first class. The passenger area includes two closed-system toilets and a space for passengers with limited mobility, large luggage, or bicycles, near which there are lifts for the disabled.

The Acatus II is equipped with a driver's assistant seat, allowing them to exceed speeds of 130 km/h in normal operation, which requires a two-person crew. Visibility from the cab is good, except for a blind spot right in front of the vehicle. This requires special attention when starting at low platforms and at level crossings.

This train is a more basic version of the Elf family of vehicles. Among the technical differences, it does not meet the crashworthiness standard PN-EN-15227 (the structural strength itself is identical to that of the elves – P II according to the PN-EN-12663-1 standard), lacks tread cleaning blocks, and flange lubrication is reduced to only the external axles of the powered bogie (both in the elf).

In 2016, the units were sent for periodic repairs, during which they received new paintwork.

In 2021, at the Pesa Mińsk Mazowiecki plant, level P4 repairs of the Acatus units began, combined with modernization including, among other things, the replacement of brake discs and monoblock wheels, installation of a passenger information system, passenger counting system, Wi-Fi transmitters, bike racks, a new internal and external monitoring system, and replacement of seat upholstery, installation.

== Operation ==
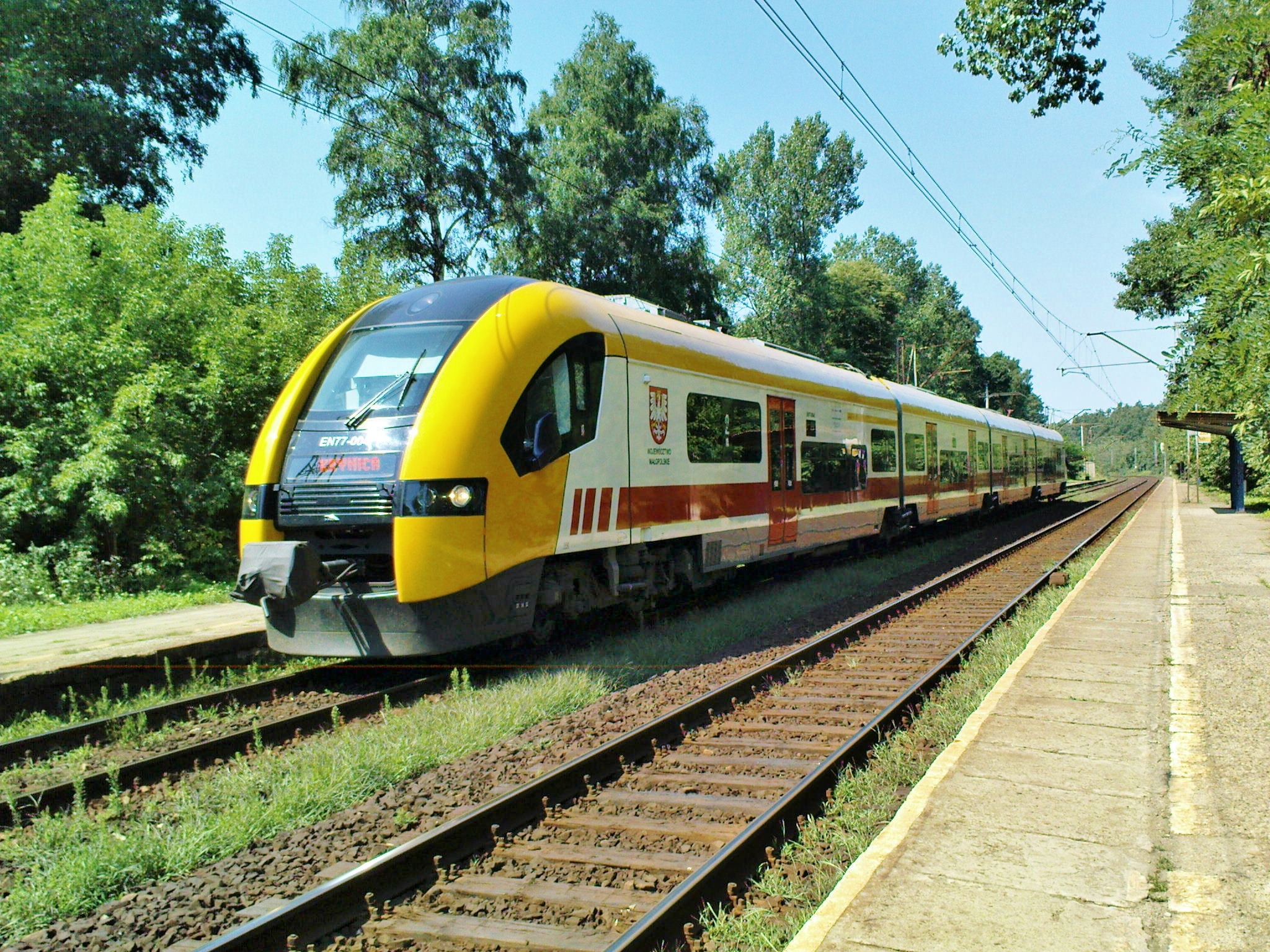
EN77-004 at the Szarów railway station (2011)

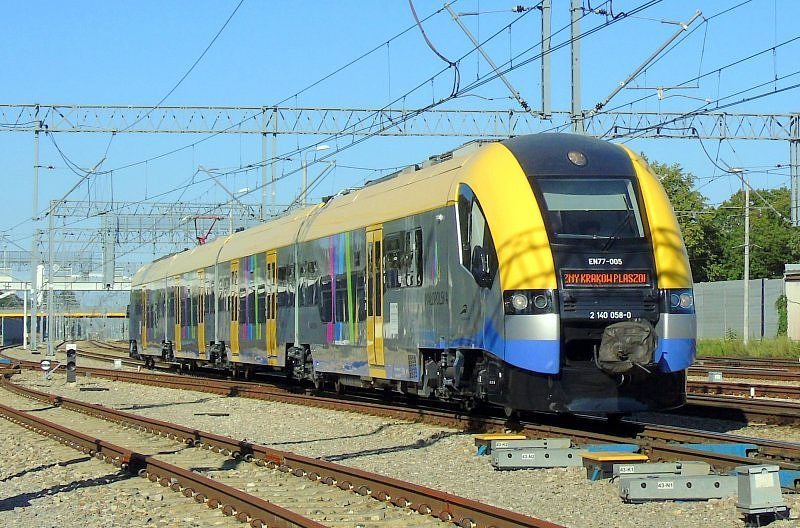
EN77-005 in new livery (2016)

On 28 January 2010, a contract was signed for the delivery of 5 new Acatus II type electric multiple units with the local government of the Lesser Poland Voivodeship. The purchase of the rolling stock was financed with European Union funds under the Lesser Poland Regional Operational Programme for 2007–2013.

On 28 January 2011, the first two trains were delivered to Kraków and made their maiden journey in the livery of Polregio to Tarnów and Krynica via Nowy Sącz. The next two sets were delivered on March 29. The last, fifth Acatus II, was delivered in the second quarter of 2011.

In the autumn of 2012, an issue of excessive wear of the wheelsets emerged. In September, one set was taken out of service due to the critical wear of the wheelsets. In December, 3 more sets were withdrawn, with the last one withdrawn in May 2013. All vehicles had traveled from 70 to 80 thousand km, even though they were supposed to cover 100 thousand km according to the contract. As a result, Polregio demanded repairs at the manufacturer's expense. After repairing and returning the first 2 sets, Pesa retained the third repaired set and issued an invoice for the repair of all 3 sets. According to Pesa, the reason for the rapid wear of the wheels in the EN77 is the poor state of infrastructure in the Lesser Poland Voivodeship, although the manufacturer was aware of the condition of the railway lines.

On 12 December 2015, the lease agreement for the units by Polregio ended. On December 13, the units were leased to Lesser Poland Railways. The reason for the change in the operator was the transfer of the operation of the Kraków Główny–Sędziszów line from Polregio to Lesser Poland Railways.

In 2017, EN77-001, 002, and 005 were temporarily transferred to Polregio.

On 24 September 2018, the Marshal's Office adopted a resolution to contribute all EN77 EMUs as a non-monetary contribution to Lesser Poland Railways.

By 2021, all Acatus II units underwent periodic maintenance, including modernization efforts such as new seating, bike racks, Wi-Fi, and upgraded passenger information systems.

=== Train names ===
In May 2011, a competition was announced to name the trains, resulting in names being assigned to the trains on September 27. Each name refers to one of the subregions of Lesser Poland.

Designation	Name	Subregion
EN77-001	Peacock Feather	Kraków
EN77-002	Swallow	Tarnów
EN77-003	Jurassic	Western Lesser Poland
EN77-004	Nikifor	Nowy Sącz
EN77-005	Tischner	Podhale

Individual trains are not permanently assigned to their "own" subregions. For example, EN77-003 Jurassic operates some connections to Zakopane.

From June 1 to November 5, 2012, a train Interregio Nikifor ran from Krynica to Warsaw. However, this route was not operated by EN77-004 with the same name but by trains of a different type. The shared name sometimes caused confusion.

Names and photographs
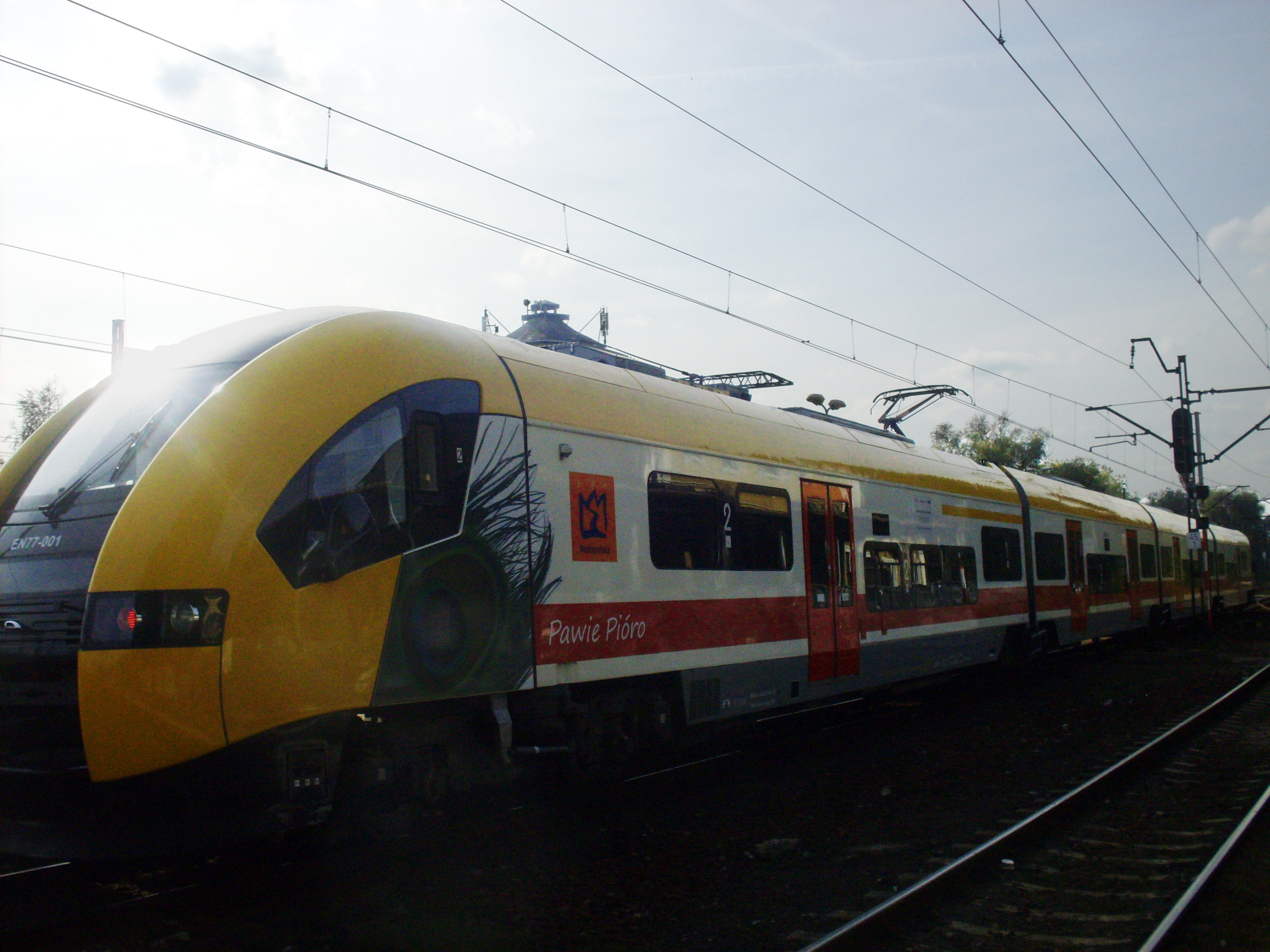
EN77-001 – Peacock Feather

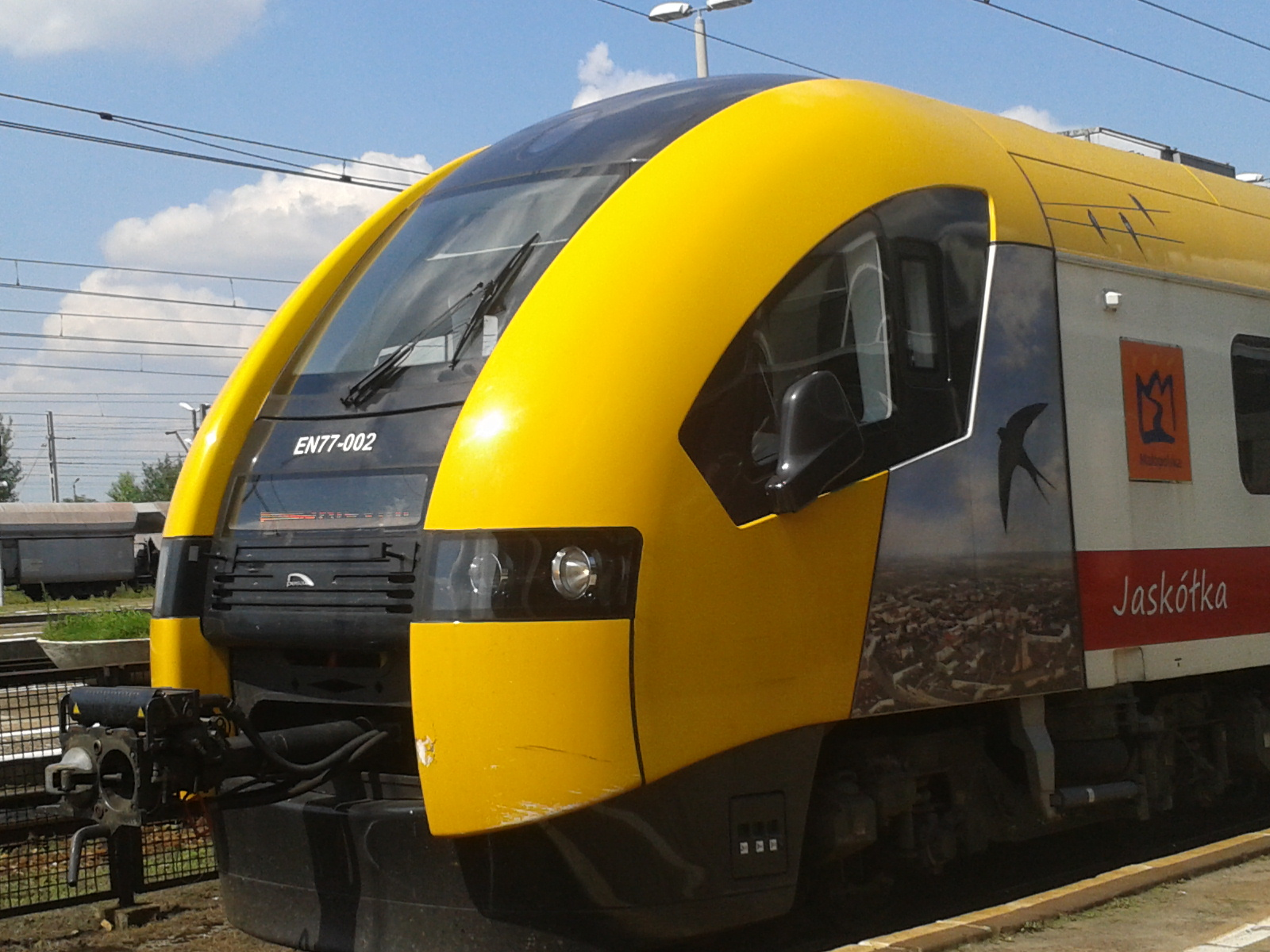
EN77-002 – Swallow

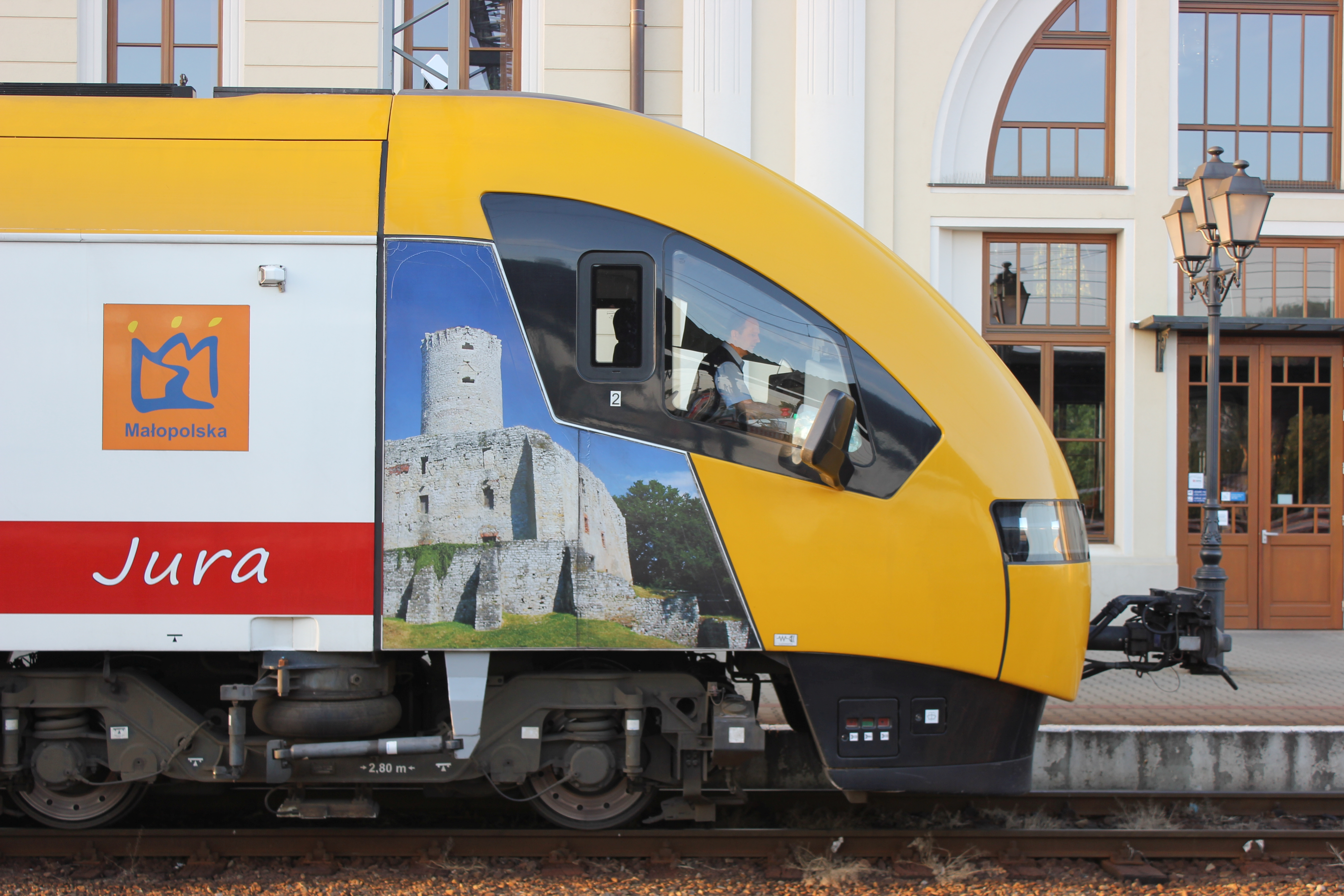
EN77-003 – Jurassic

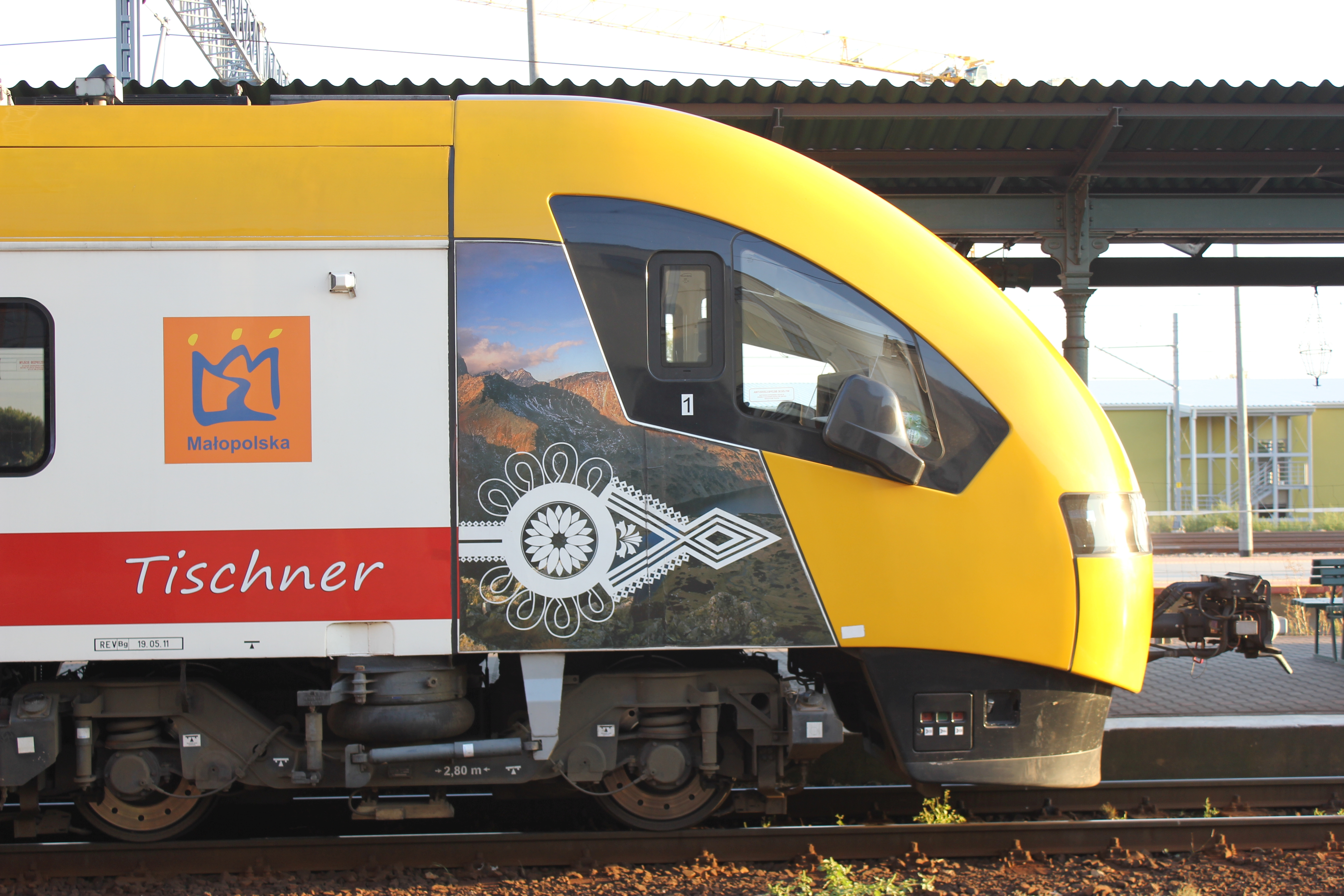
EN77-005 – Tischner
