= Church of the Holy Family (Kraków) =

Catholic Church in Kraków

- Kościół Najświętszej Rodziny
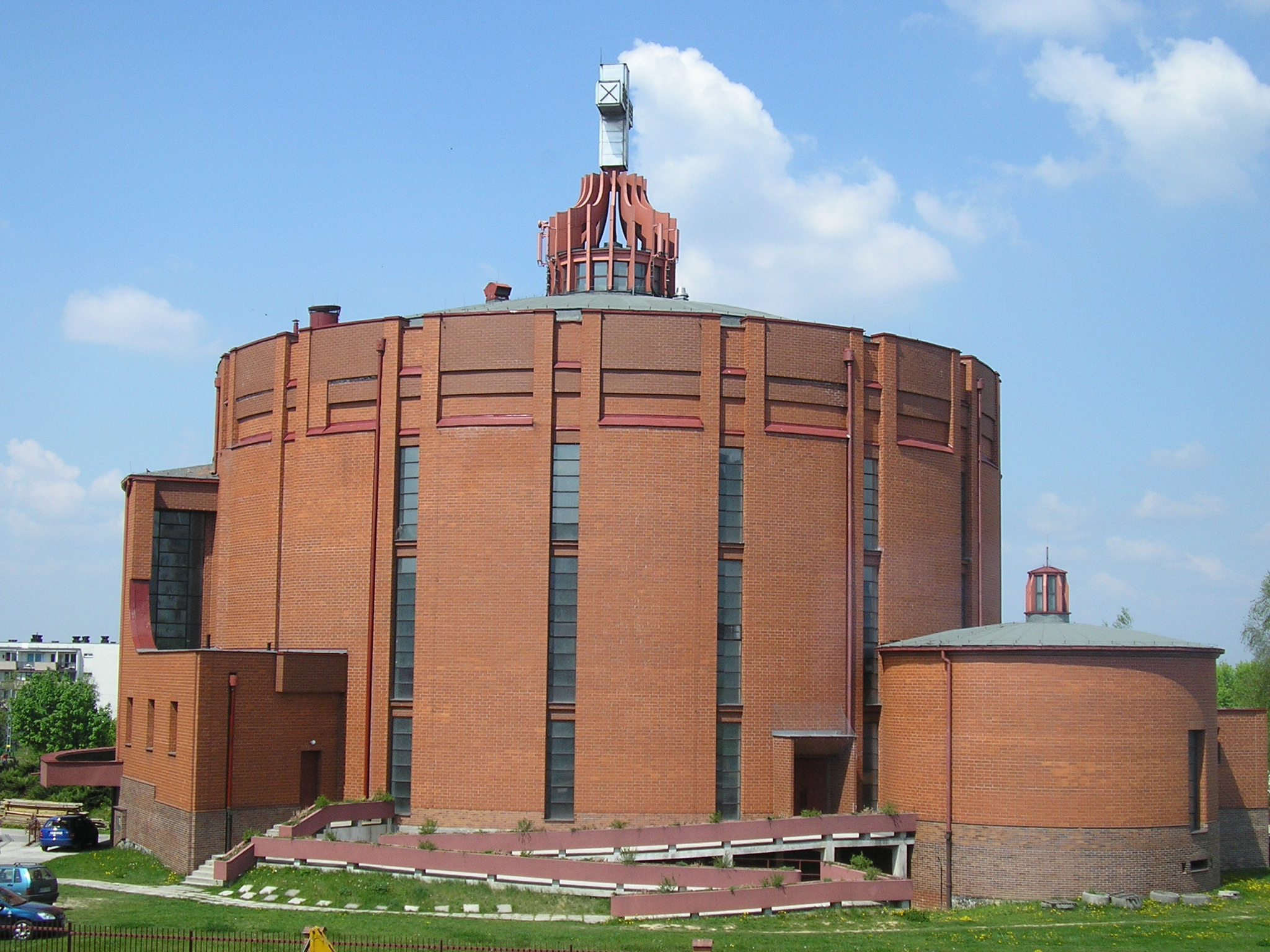
- Sanctuary of the Holy Family in Kraków

Religion
- Affiliation: Catholic

Location
- Location: Biezanów Prokocim
- Municipality: Kraków
- State: Małopolskie
- Country: Poland
- Interactive map of Church of the Holy Family
- Coordinates: 50°00′55″N 20°01′07″E

Architecture
- Groundbreaking: 1983
- Completed: 1992

Website
- https://www.najswietszarodzina.pl

The Church of the Holy Family is a Catholic Parish church located in the Biezanów-Prokocim district of Kraków, Poland. It began construction in 1983 and was finished in 1992. It was given the title of sanctuary of the Holy Family in 1994 by Cardinal Franciszek Macharski
