= Pesa Acatus Plus =

Family of electric multiple units produced by Pesa

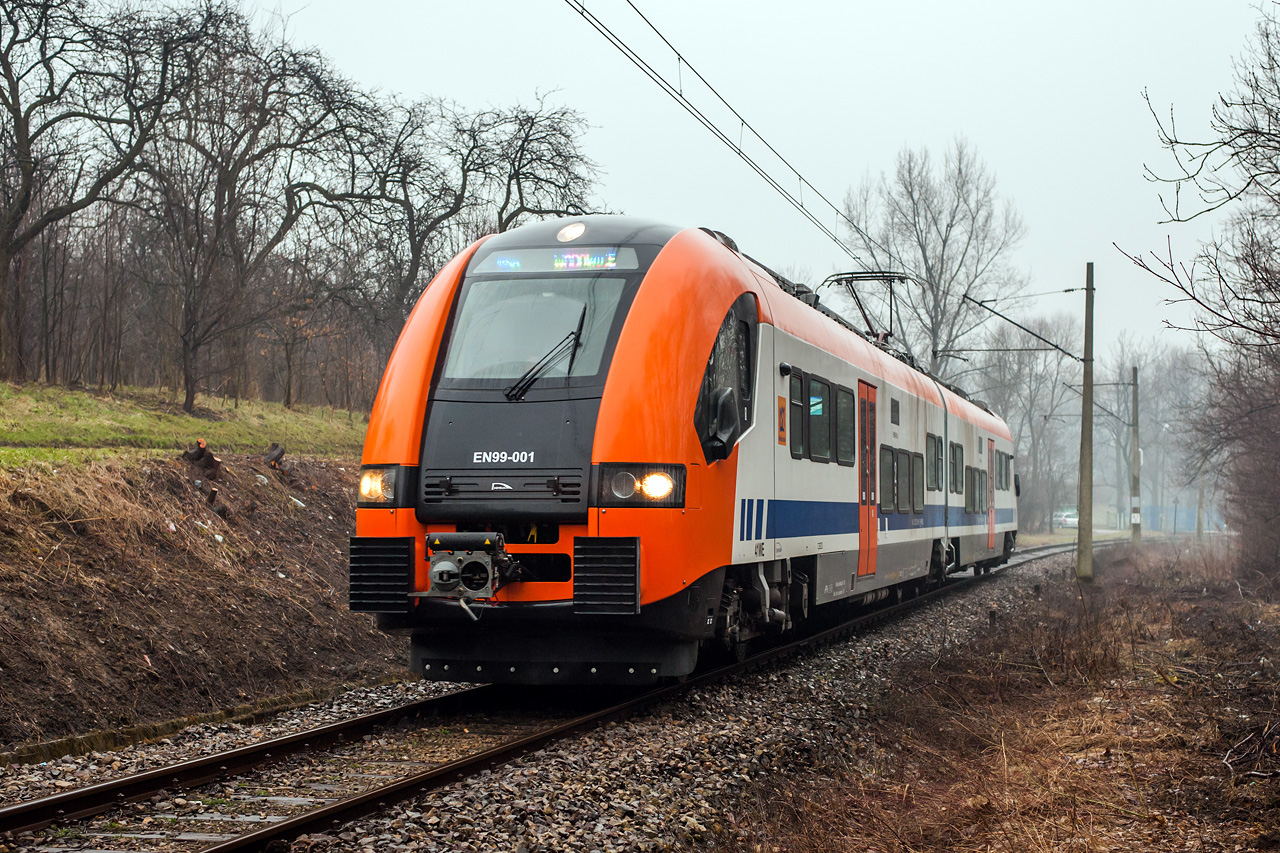
- Lesser Poland Railways's EN99-001
- Stock type: electric multiple unit
- Manufacturer: Pesa
- Assembly: Bydgoszcz; Poland
- Constructed: 2014–2016

Specifications
- Maximum speed: 140–160 km/h (87–99 mph)
- Engine type: induction motor

Pesa Acatus Plus is a family of electric multiple units (EMUs) manufactured by Pesa in Bydgoszcz, Poland. Designed as an advanced version of the Pesa Acatus II, it serves as a cost-effective alternative to the Pesa Elf. The Acatus Plus is operated by Polregio and Lesser Poland Railways, with a total of 13 units produced: nine 3-car and four 2-car units.

== History ==
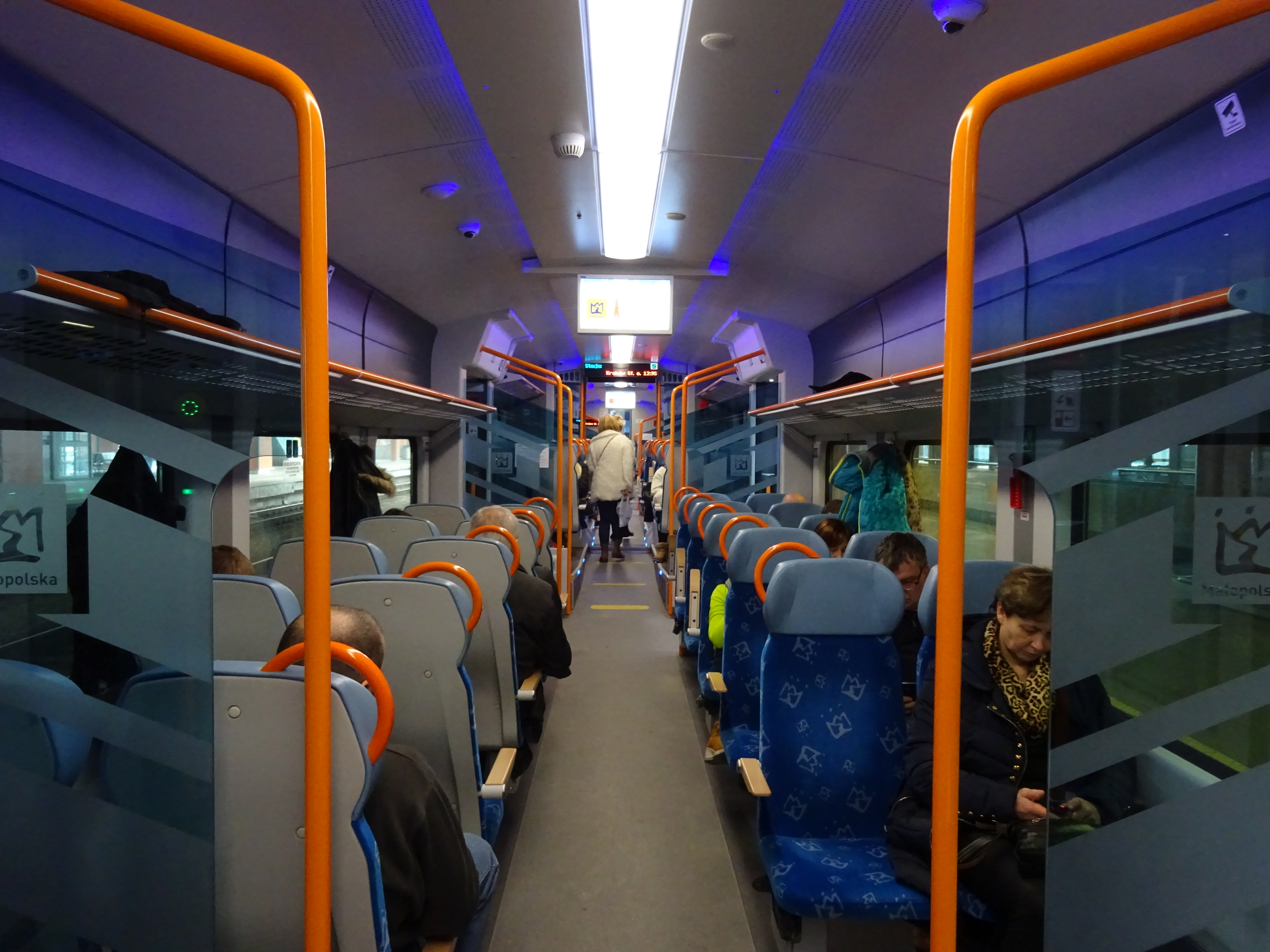
Interior of Lesser Poland Railways's Acatus Plus EN64-003

=== Development ===
Pesa introduced the Pesa Elf, but it lost several tenders to competitors offering lower-cost vehicles. To address this, the Bydgoszcz-based manufacturer developed the Acatus Plus, a new family of electric multiple units that balances affordability with the requirements of certain operators. The Elf remained in Pesa's portfolio for international orders and tenders with stricter specifications.

=== Orders ===
- 4 September 2013 – contract signed for the delivery of two 40WE EMUs to the Subcarpathian Voivodeship.
- 18 October 2013 – contract signed for the delivery of six 40WEa and four 41WE EMUs to the Lesser Poland Voivodeship.
- 25 August 2015 – contract signed for the delivery of one 40WE EMU to the Świętokrzyskie Voivodeship.

=== Testing ===
In late July 2014, the first 3-car Acatus Plus, designated EN62-002, underwent testing at the Test Track Centre near Żmigród.

== Design ==
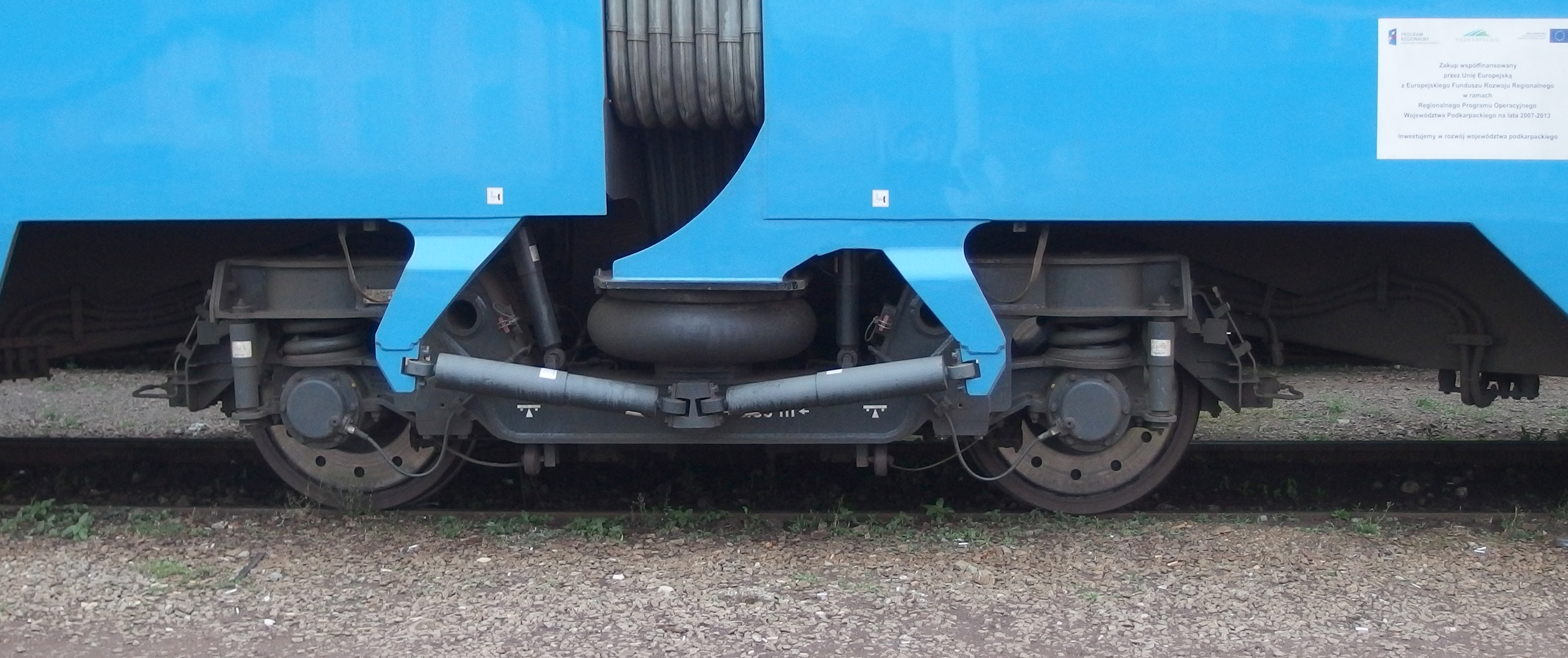
Passive bogie of EN64-001

The Acatus Plus is an electric multiple unit designed for regional rail and commuter rail services, available in configurations ranging from 2 to 6 cars. Only 2-car (type 41WE) and 3-car (type 40WE) versions have been produced, while a 4-car version (type 42WE) was designated but not built.

The Acatus Plus is based on the Pesa Acatus II, with differences in the propulsion and running gear systems, as well as compliance with Technical Specifications for Interoperability (TSI) Lok&Pas crashworthiness standards.

The units feature a new family of bogies: 27MN (powered) and 42AN (unpowered), with reduced axle spacing of 2,700 mm and 2,600 mm, respectively. Powered bogies are equipped with VEM motors and Gmeinder gearboxes, while unpowered bogies use a single pair of pneumatic springs for body support.

The floor at door areas is 760 mm above rail level, with high-floor sections above powered bogies accessible by steps. Transition areas between cars have sloped flooring, and steps at entrances accommodate lower platforms.

In the first quarter of 2025, Lesser Poland Railways announced a tender for periodic P4-level maintenance and modernization, including the installation of European Train Control System (ETCS) cab signaling, for four of its EN64 units.

=== Variants ===
Type	Cars	Axle arrangement	Door layout	Seating capacity	Operating weight	Total length	Motors (power)	Maximum operating speed	Amenities	Source
40WE Subcarpathian	3	Bo'2'2'Bo'	1–1–1	157+13	109 t	58.95 m	(1,440 kW)	140 km/h	air conditioning, bike racks, toilet(s), power outlets, Wi-Fi, ticket machines	
40WEa	3	Bo'2'2'Bo'	1–2–1	127+11	109 t	58.95 m	4×360 kW	160 km/h	air conditioning, bike racks, toilet(s), power outlets, Wi-Fi	
40WE Świętokrzyskie	3	Bo'2'2'Bo'	1–1–1	150				160 km/h	air conditioning, bike racks, toilet(s), power outlets, Wi-Fi, ticket machines	
41WE	2	Bo'2'Bo'	1–1	85+11	84.6 t	42.65 m	4×340 kW	160 km/h	air conditioning, bike racks, toilet(s), power outlets, Wi-Fi	

== Operations ==
Country	Owner	Operator	Type	Operator designation	Cars	Delivery years	Units	Source
Poland	Subcarpathian Voivodeship	Polregio (Subcarpathian Branch)	40WE	EN64-001, 005	3	2014	2	
Poland	Lesser Poland Voivodeship	Polregio (Lesser Poland Branch) and Lesser Poland Railways	40WEa	EN64-002–004, 006–008	3	2014–2015	6	
Poland	Lesser Poland Voivodeship	Polregio (Lesser Poland Branch) and Lesser Poland Railways	41WE	EN99-001–004	2	2014–2015	4	
Poland	Świętokrzyskie Voivodeship	Polregio (Świętokrzyskie Branch)	40WE	EN64-009	3	2016	1	
Total units:							13	

=== Subcarpathian Voivodeship ===
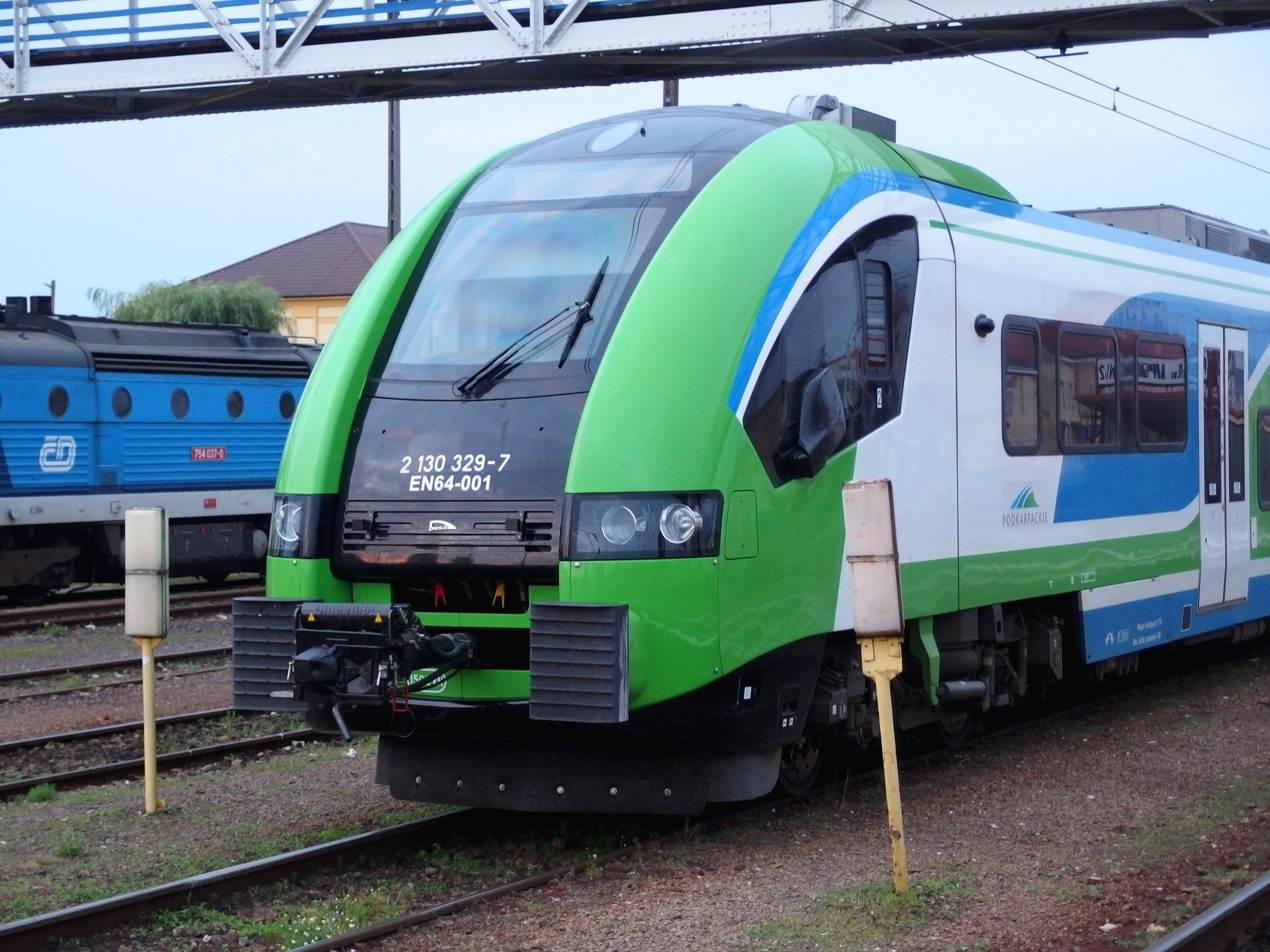
EN64-001 at Rzeszów Główny railway station

On 4 September 2013, the Subcarpathian Voivodeship awarded Pesa a contract for two 3-car EMUs. The first unit was due by 31 August 2014, and the second by 30 September 2014. Both units were delivered by late November 2014 and began service on the Rzeszów Główny–Przemyśl Główny route.

=== Lesser Poland Voivodeship ===
Series	Number	Delivery date	Operator	Operation period	Source
EN64	002	3 November 2014	Przewozy Regionalne	4 November 2014 – 13 December 2014	
EN64	002	3 November 2014	Lesser Poland Railways	14 December 2014 – 10 December 2016	
EN64	002	3 November 2014	Przewozy Regionalne	From 11 December 2016	
EN64	003	3 November 2014	Przewozy Regionalne	4 November 2014 – 13 December 2014	
EN64	003	3 November 2014	Lesser Poland Railways	14 December 2014 – 10 December 2016	
EN64	003	3 November 2014	Przewozy Regionalne	From 11 December 2016	
EN64	004	21 November 2014	Przewozy Regionalne	21 November 2014 – 13 December 2014	
EN64	004	21 November 2014	Lesser Poland Railways	14 December 2014 – 10 December 2016	
EN64	004	21 November 2014	Przewozy Regionalne	11 December 2016 – 9 December 2017	
EN64	004	21 November 2014	Lesser Poland Railways	From 10 December 2017	
EN64	006	30 November 2014	Przewozy Regionalne	30 November 2014 – 31 August 2015	
EN64	006	30 November 2014	Lesser Poland Railways	1 September 2015 – 10 December 2016	
EN64	006	30 November 2014	Przewozy Regionalne	11 December 2016 – 9 December 2017	
EN64	006	30 November 2014	Lesser Poland Railways	From 10 December 2017	
EN64	007	30 December 2014	Przewozy Regionalne	31 December 2014 – 31 August 2015	
EN64	007	30 December 2014	Lesser Poland Railways	1 September 2015 – 10 December 2016	
EN64	007	30 December 2014	Przewozy Regionalne	11 December 2016 – 9 December 2017	
EN64	007	30 December 2014	Lesser Poland Railways	From 10 December 2017	
EN64	008	30 January 2015	Przewozy Regionalne	31 January 2015 – 28 February 2015	
EN64	008	30 January 2015	Lesser Poland Railways	1 March 2015 – 10 December 2016	
EN64	008	30 January 2015	Przewozy Regionalne	11 December 2016 – 9 December 2017	
EN64	008	30 January 2015	Lesser Poland Railways	From 10 December 2017	
EN99	001	2 January 2015	Przewozy Regionalne	3 January 2015 – 12 December 2015	
EN99	001	2 January 2015	Lesser Poland Railways	13 December 2015 – 10 December 2016	
EN99	001	2 January 2015	Przewozy Regionalne	From 11 December 2016	
EN99	002	6 February 2015	Przewozy Regionalne	7 February 2015 – 12 December 2015	
EN99	002	6 February 2015	Lesser Poland Railways	13 December 2015 – 10 December 2016	
EN99	002	6 February 2015	Przewozy Regionalne	From 11 December 2016	
EN99	003	20 February 2015	Przewozy Regionalne	21 February 2015 – 12 December 2015	
EN99	003	20 February 2015	Lesser Poland Railways	13 December 2015 – 10 December 2016	
EN99	003	20 February 2015	Przewozy Regionalne	From 11 December 2016	
EN99	004	6 March 2015	Przewozy Regionalne	7 March 2015 – 12 December 2015	
EN99	004	6 March 2015	Lesser Poland Railways	13 December 2015 – 10 December 2016	
EN99	004	6 March 2015	Przewozy Regionalne	From 11 December 2016	

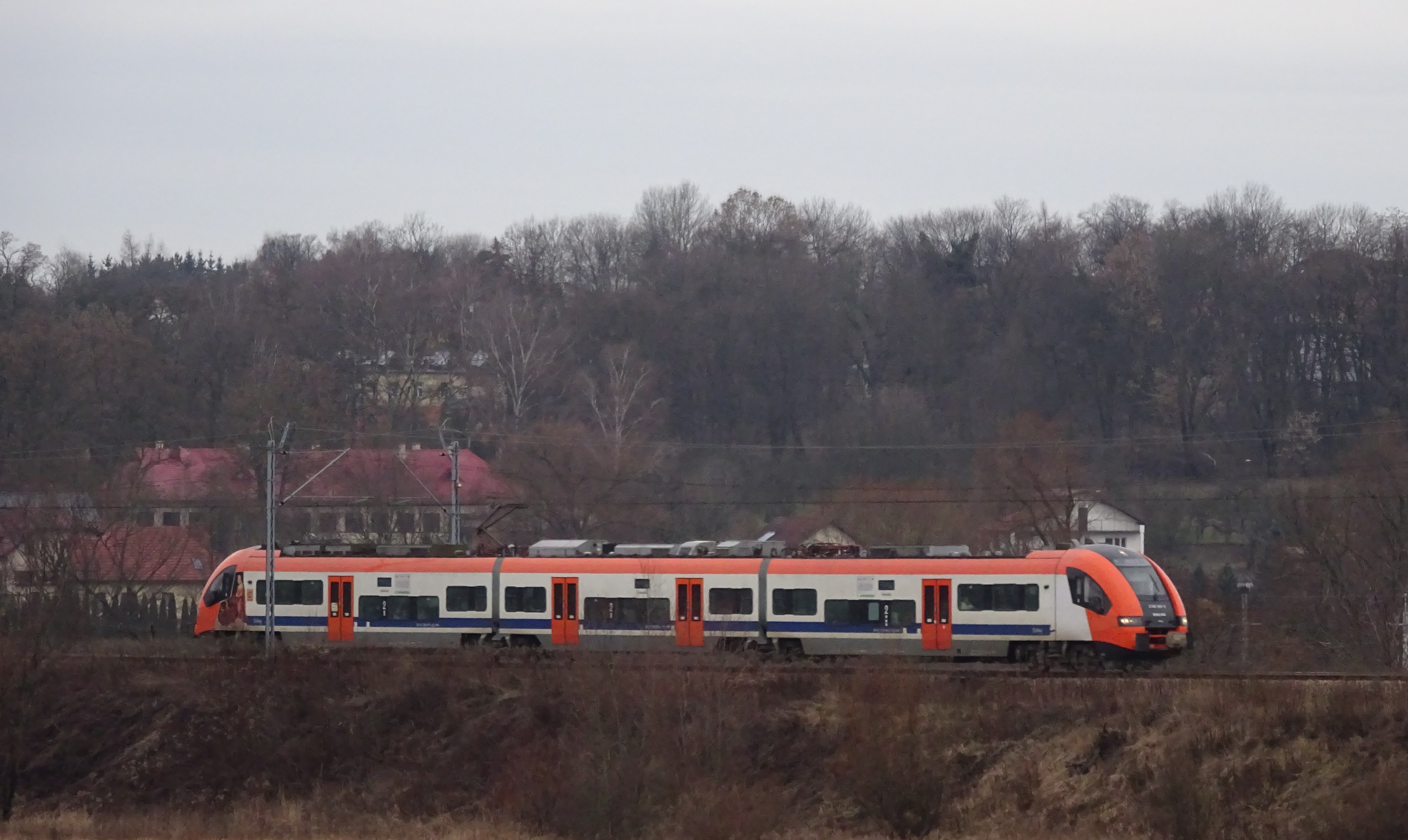
EN64-002 en route to Sędziszów

On 18 October 2013, a contract was signed with the Lesser Poland Voivodeship for six 3-car and four 2-car Acatus Plus units for the Kraków Agglomeration Railway. The first two 3-car units were delivered on 3 November 2014, and presented on 6 November at Kraków Główny railway station alongside two Newag Impuls units purchased through the Southern Purchasing Group.

The units were deployed on the Krzeszowice–Wieliczka Rynek-Kopalnia line, operated by the Lesser Poland Branch of Przewozy Regionalne. On 14 December 2014, Lesser Poland Railways began operations, taking over three EN64 units. An additional unit was transferred on 1 March 2015. Two units served the Kraków Główny–Wieliczka Rynek-Kopalnia line, with the others in reserve. Delivery of 3-car units was completed by 30 January 2015.

Between 2 January and 6 March 2015, all four 2-car EN99 units were delivered and handed over to Przewozy Regionalne. On 1 September 2015, Lesser Poland Railways took over two EN64 units from Przewozy Regionalne. On 13 September 2015, EN64-008 was used for a promotional trip on the Kraków Główny–Kraków Lotnisko railway during the "Odlotowa Niedziela" event, celebrating the completion of the first part of the new passenger terminal at Kraków John Paul II International Airport. Regular services to Kraków Lotnisko railway station began on 28 September.

On 5 December 2015, EN64-002 made a promotional trip from Kraków Główny to Miechów. On 13 December 2015, four EN99 units were transferred to Lesser Poland Railways, which also began operating the Kraków Główny–Miechów–Sędziszów route.

On 11 December 2016, Przewozy Regionalne resumed operation of the Kraków Główny–Sędziszów route, and all Acatus Plus units were transferred back to them. On 10 December 2017, four EN64 units were returned to Lesser Poland Railways.

Each Acatus Plus unit was given a unique name: Solny, Szarotka, Centuś, Królewski, Zalipianka, Juhas, Gazda, Poprad, Sabała, and Hejnalista.

=== Świętokrzyskie Voivodeship ===
On 25 August 2015, the Świętokrzyskie Voivodeship signed a contract for one 40WE unit. The unit was due by February 2016, but delays led the voivodeship to seek penalties from Pesa. Technical acceptance began on 21 April 2016, and the unit was delivered to Kielce in early May. It was officially handed over on 10 May at Skarżysko-Kamienna railway station.
