= Pesa Acatus =

Electric multiple unit produced by Pesa Bydgoszcz in 2006

ED59
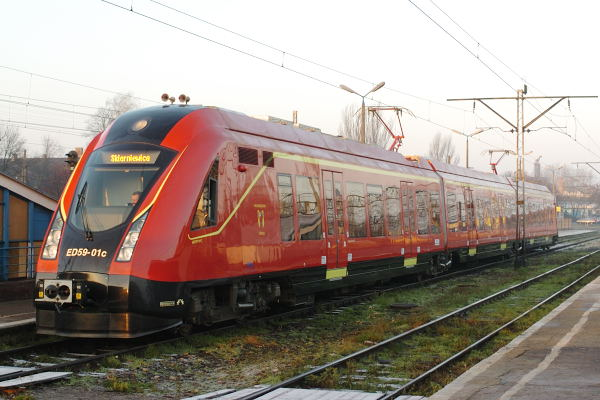
- ED59-01 at Kutno railway station
- Stock type: Electric multiple unit
- Manufacturer: Pesa Bydgoszcz
- Constructed: 2006
- Number built: 19
- Capacity: 157+4 seats 350 in total

Specifications
- Train length: 63,000 millimetres (207 ft)
- Width: 2,870 millimetres (9.42 ft)
- Height: 4,360 millimetres (14.30 ft)
- Floor height: 1,000 millimetres (3.3 ft)
- Wheel diameter: 840 millimetres (2.76 ft)
- Maximum speed: 140 km/h (87 mph)
- Weight: 105 tonnes (231,000 lb)
- Axle load: 3 kV DC
- Engine type: induction motor (DKLBZ 3112-4A)
- Power output: 2,000 kW
- Acceleration: 1 m/s²
- Braking system: Knorr + ED
- Seating: s+d+s

Pesa Acatus (Latin for boat) is a standard-gauge electric multiple unit produced in a single copy at the Pesa plant in Bydgoszcz in 2006, specifically for the Marshal's Office of the Łódź Voivodeship. During test runs, it was a four-car unit (ED74 series, 16WE unit type, 310Ba+411Ba+411Bb+310Bb car type), and it is nowadays operated in a three-car configuration (ED59 series, 15WE type).

The design of the vehicle began in 2004, and a year later, it was offered in a tender and subsequently ordered. In April 2006, the production of the train was completed, and throughout that month, it underwent testing for approval for operation. On 29 May 2006, an official presentation of the unit took place in Łódź, combined with an inaugural ride. In 2011, the unit was withdrawn and awaited overhaul, which was ultimately carried out from December 2013 to June 2014. In 2016, the technically functional vehicle was withdrawn due to the expiration of its approval for operation.

In 2007, a development version of the vehicle named Bydgostia was created. In 2010, the manufacturer also built the Acatus II model, and in 2014, the Acatus Plus family, but they are only related to Acatus by name.

== History ==
=== Origins ===
After World War II, electric multiple units were produced until 1997 exclusively by Pafawag in Wrocław. Pafawag was the manufacturer of the most popular electric multiple unit series in Poland, the EN57. After privatization in the 1990s, the plant ceased production of vehicles of this type, and the last produced unit was the ED73 in 1997. Polish State Railways then ended orders for new rolling stock, including electric multiple units.

Since the late 1980s, Polish State Railways, and since the early 21st century also local governments, mainly purchased diesel railcars and diesel multiple units, as fuel-consuming locomotives dominated the operation of non-electrified lines. This allowed Polish manufacturers and carriers to gain experience in the production and operation of lightweight rolling stock. Additionally, existing electric multiple units of the EN57 series owned by Polish carriers were modernized.

At the beginning of the 21st century, electric traction units from new manufacturers, such as Pesa Bydgoszcz, Newag, and Stadler, began to appear on Polish tracks. Pesa, after a deep restructuring in 1998, started producing railbuses in 2001, but in 2004, it also undertook the construction of the first electric multiple unit – the 13WE (EN95) for the Warsaw Commuter Railway, adapted to a 600 V DC. Despite plans to purchase 10 units of these vehicles, production was terminated after only one unit.

In 2005, the Marshal's Office of the Łódź Voivodeship announced a tender for the delivery of a three-car electric multiple unit. Newag and Pesa participated in the tender, and ultimately, Pesa's proposal was considered the most advantageous. This was the first order for an electric multiple unit from Pesa adapted to a 3000 V DC.

=== Fulfillment of the order ===
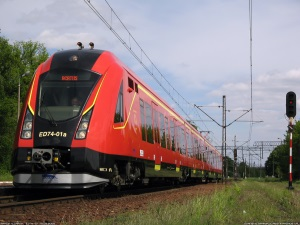
ED74-01 during testing

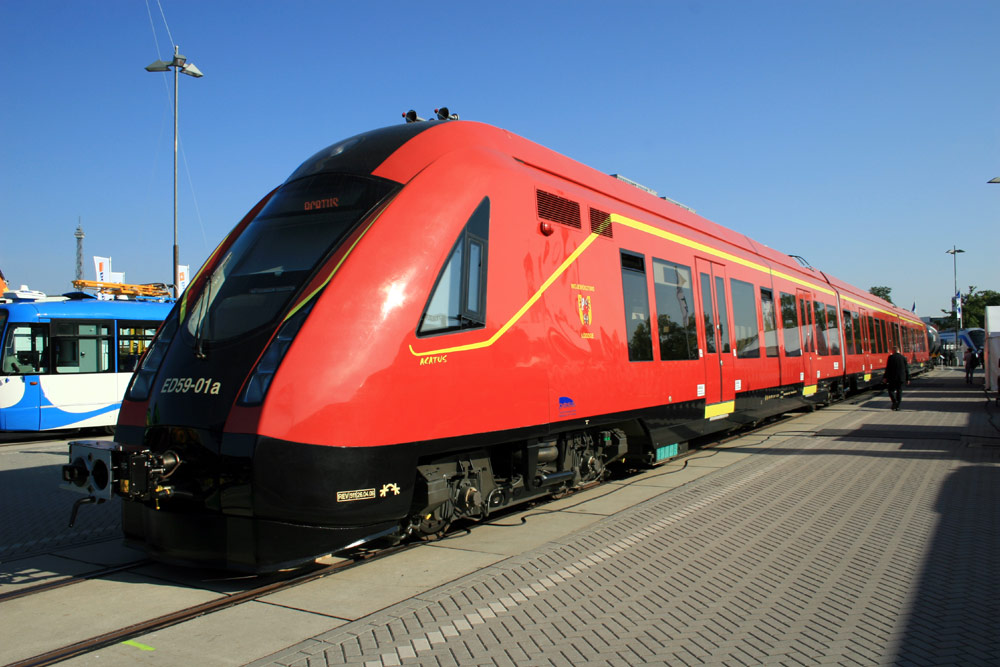
ED59-01 at the InnoTrans fair in 2006

On 26 May 2005, a contract was signed for the delivery of the vehicle, which was to be completed by April 2006. Earlier, in 2004, work began on designing this unit. The task of developing a comprehensive concept for the unit was entrusted to the Marad Design studio. Marek Adamczewski, Jacek Poćwiardowski, Jakub Gołębiewski, Mariusz Gorczyński, and Barbara Kusz-Hallmann were involved in the train's design. On September 6, the design team received technical specifications from the manufacturer, which were clarified, specified, and supplemented over the following months. On 4 February 2005, conceptual designs were presented, from which Pesa selected one for further development in April. Documentation, visualizations, and drawings were then created, with this stage completed by August. In September, Marad Design and Pesa presented the results of their work to the client after negotiations, and they began creating the final project. Work on the design was completed in November 2005, with final interior equipment arrangements made in February 2006. The body frame was manufactured in Sanok by Autosan.

Although a three-car unit was ordered, Pesa initially produced a four-car unit at its own expense. This was done to conduct tests related to the next order for four-car electric multiple units for Polregio and simultaneously reduce the costs of obtaining homologation for vehicles from both orders. During testing, the prototype four-car unit of type 16WE was designated ED74-01.

On 1 April 2006, the vehicle was completed, and its first trial run took place on the route from Bydgoszcz Główna to Laskowice Pomorskie. On April 3, the vehicle reached a speed of 120 km/h on the same route, and two days later, the train traveled to the Railway Institute test track in Węglewo near Żmigród. It arrived on April 7, and further homologation tests commenced. Tests combined with a presentation of the unit took place on April 21, and on April 28, during trials on the Central Rail Line, a speed of 175 km/h was reached. On May 30, the Rail Transport Office issued approval for the vehicle's operation in both the three-car and four-car versions.

Before being handed over to Łódź Polregio, one of the two middle cars was disconnected, and the vehicle designation was changed from ED74-01 to ED59-01. On 29 May 2006, the official presentation of the Acatus took place at Łódź Fabryczna railway station, followed by an inaugural journey to Koluszki railway station. From 19 to 22 September 2006, the unit was presented at the InnoTrans trade fair in Berlin.

=== Successor and other Acatuses ===
In 2007, a developmental version of Acatus called 16WEk Bydgostia was created. The first unit received the designation ED74-001, which was carried during the test runs of the four-car 16WE Acatus.

In 2010, the manufacturer introduced the Acatus II vehicle, and in 2014, the Acatus Plus. However, they only reference Acatus in name, as they are simpler versions of the Elf model.

== Construction ==
The electric multiple unit type 15WE is a three-car, single-deck train designed for regional passenger services on electrified lines powered by 3,000 V DC. During testing, it was a four-car unit of type 16WE consisting of wagons of types 310Ba+411Ba+411Bb+310Bb. The unit was also given the commercial name Acatus, which means boat in Latin. The manufacturer estimated the durability of this vehicle for approximately 30 years of operation.

=== Body ===
The body is constructed as welded from steel sections, covered with aluminum cladding using adhesive technology. Each unit of the vehicle has two pairs of doors on each side, with a clearance of 1,300 mm, below which retractable steps are located. The units are connected using Jacobs bogies, which prevents shortening and lengthening of the train under operational conditions. At both ends of the vehicle, an ESW Talent coupling is mounted, which allows connection to up to three vehicles of the same type and multiple-unit operation. However, this possibility is only hypothetical, as only one unit was produced.

=== Passenger space ===
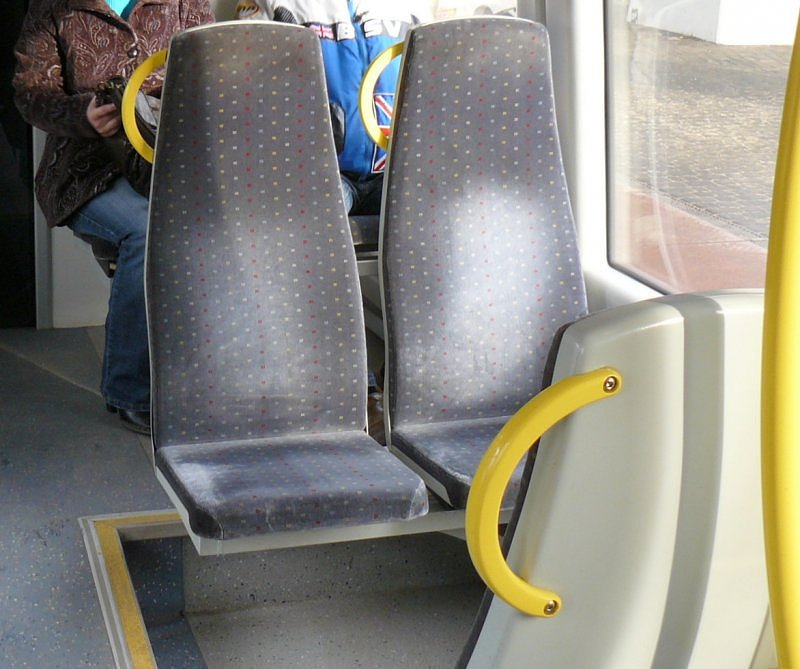
Seats in ED59-01

In most of the passenger space, vandal-resistant seats are arranged in a 2+2 configuration with a passage in the middle between them. A different interior layout is found around the toilets, which are constructed in a closed system and located in the end units. One of them is adapted for people with disabilities and has spaces with wheelchair straps, while the other has folding seats. There are 54 fixed seats in one end car, 64 in the middle car, and 39 fixed seats and 4 folding seats in the other end car.

The entrance doors are equipped with individual opening buttons activated after unlocking by the driver and closing signal. Additionally, infrared phototubes preventing passengers from being trapped are placed at ¼ of the entrance height. The entrance vestibules are equipped with laminated glass windbreaks. An emergency brake handle, emergency door opening lever, duplex device, trash bin, and handrails for standing passengers are mounted on them.

The vehicle is equipped with an air conditioning system manufactured by Thermo King, with ducts supplying heated or cooled air located under the ceiling covering. In addition, the interior of the unit is equipped with a visual and voice information system, 10 monitoring cameras, and smoke detectors.

=== Driver's cab ===
The unit has two driver's cabs located at each end.

The cab is equipped with a centrally positioned control panel typical for Pesa vehicles. It is equipped with buttons and levers for operating the vehicle, as well as liquid-crystal displays showing real-time driving parameters, the vehicle's technical condition, and location obtained through the Global Positioning System. This data is also stored by a digital parameter recorder in the internal memory, which can be read and analyzed on an external computer. On the left side of the control panel base, there is a Koliber radiotelephone manufactured by Radionika. An Isri brand seat is installed in front of the panel, and a folding seat is placed on the wall to its left. The side windows can be opened.

A corridor leads to the cabin from the passenger compartment, which is closed by toughened glass doors. Along its sides, there are cabinets with electrical equipment.

=== Bogies and drive ===
The Acatus is based on four Pesa-manufactured bogies. Two outer bogies are type 22MN drive bogies, and two inner bogies are Jacobs type 35AN rolling bogies. The base of all bogies is 2,500 mm, and the diameter of all wheels is 840 mm. The wheelset centers have a spacing of 18,000 mm.

The vehicle is the second after the 13WE Polish electric multiple unit equipped with asynchronous drive and the first electric multiple unit with such a drive for 3,000 V DC. Its drive consists of four VEM Sachsenwerk DKLBZ 3112-4A induction motors with a power of 500 kW each. They are arranged in pairs on each of the two drive bogies. Each motor is powered by an individual three-phase traction inverter type FT500-3000 produced by Medcom using IGBT technology. A braking resistor unit type RH500-30000 is directly connected to each motor-inverter unit and cooperates directly with the inverter. The drive system also uses voltage converters type PSM60 from Medcom and a fast switch UR6 produced by Secheron. The torque is transmitted to the wheelset axles by Voith SZH-535 traction transmissions. The entire system is controlled using DSP technology.

== Exploitation ==
Country	Carrier	Number	Type	Service period	Source
Poland	Polregio (since December 8, 2009)	1	ED59-01	May 29, 2006–April 30, 2016	

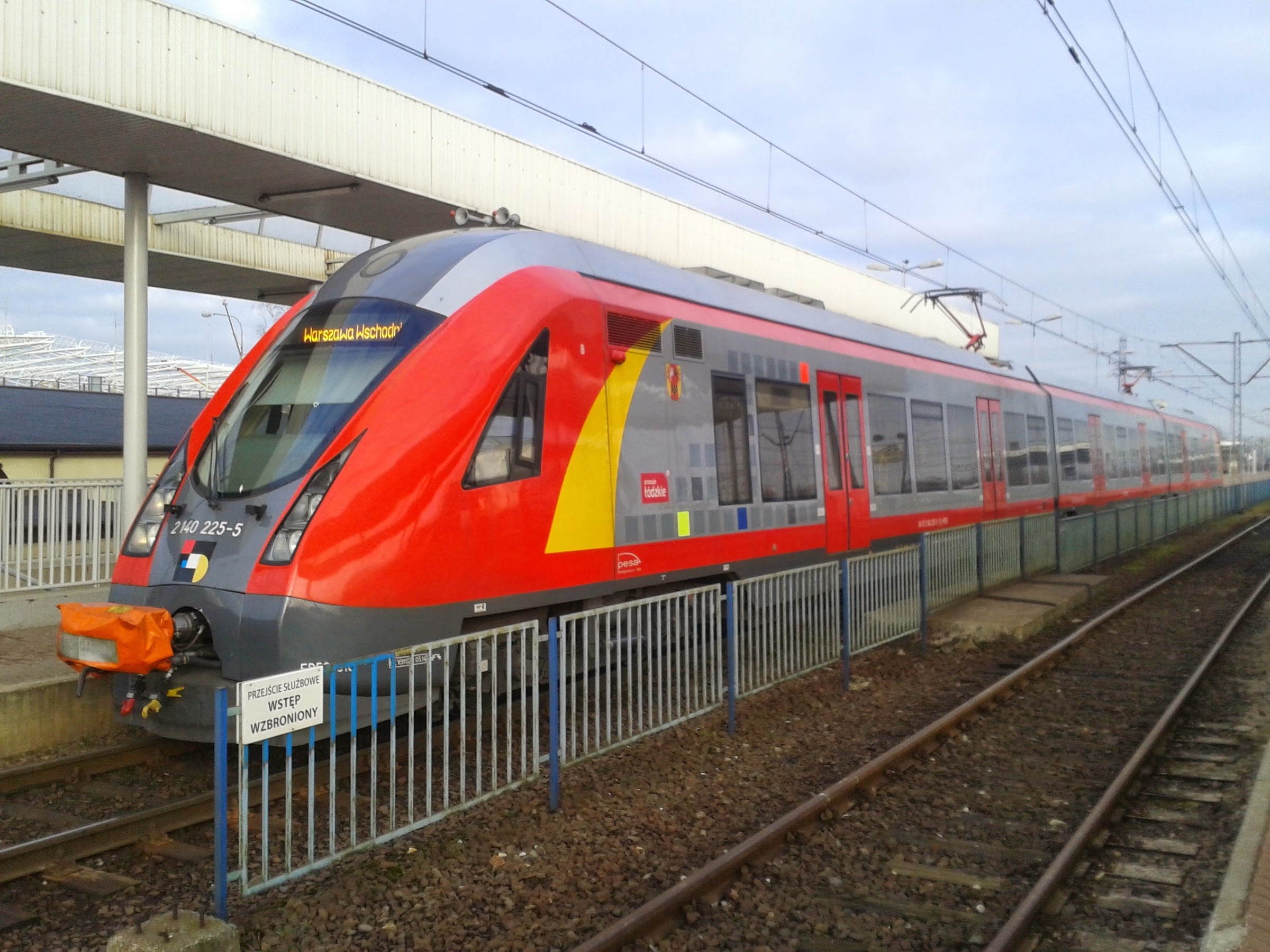
ED59 in the new colors of the Łódź Voivodeship

On 29 May 2006, the Acatus was ceremonially handed over to the Polregio company, after which the unit was deployed to operate routes in its home voivodeship. These were mainly connections between Łódź Fabryczna–Skierniewice and Łódź Fabryczna–Sieradz, and additionally, the unit could also be seen on routes such as Łódź Kaliska–Kutno. On 1 June 2009, the vehicle began servicing three Interregio connections per day on the route Łódź Fabryczna–Warszawa Wschodnia.

In the second half of 2011, the unit was parked at the base of the Łódź Regional Transport Company in Idzikowice due to a lack of overhaul repair. In March 2013, this repair was commissioned to Pesa without a tender, as they were the only company capable of performing it. It was supposed to take a month but ultimately was not completed. In June, it was announced that the repair would last until July, but again, it did not materialize due to prolonged negotiations regarding the terms and scope of the overhaul. Meanwhile, the method of financing the repair changed; initially, Polregio had intended to pay for it from its own funds, but eventually received funding from the voivodeship budget for this purpose. In December 2013, the vehicle was sent to the manufacturer's facility for repair, during which it was repainted in the new colors of the Łódź Voivodeship and equipped with Wi-Fi and ticket machines. Originally, it was supposed to return to service in April 2014, a year after the initial planned date. The next deadline was 2 June 2014, but on that day, the unit broke down a few hundred meters before the platform and was unable to take passengers. Eventually, the unit returned to service on June 5 and was deployed to operate the Łódź–Skierniewice route.

On 30 April 2016, the operational permit issued by the Rail Transport Office expired, and consequently, the technically operational vehicle was decommissioned. In June, the homologation procedure began. The unit was handed over to Pesa, which commissioned the necessary tests to the Tabor Railway Vehicle Institute. In July 2017, the procedure was still ongoing, and the Łódź Voivodeship marshal's office announced that the work leading to the issuance of a new document was advanced. On 2 April 2020, the Łódź Voivodeship Board made a resolution regarding the sale of the ED59-01, and in May 2021, the media reported that the vehicle had been repurchased by the manufacturer.
