= Pesa Bydgostia =

Electric multiple unit of Polish production, manufactured by Pesa Bydgoszcz

ED74
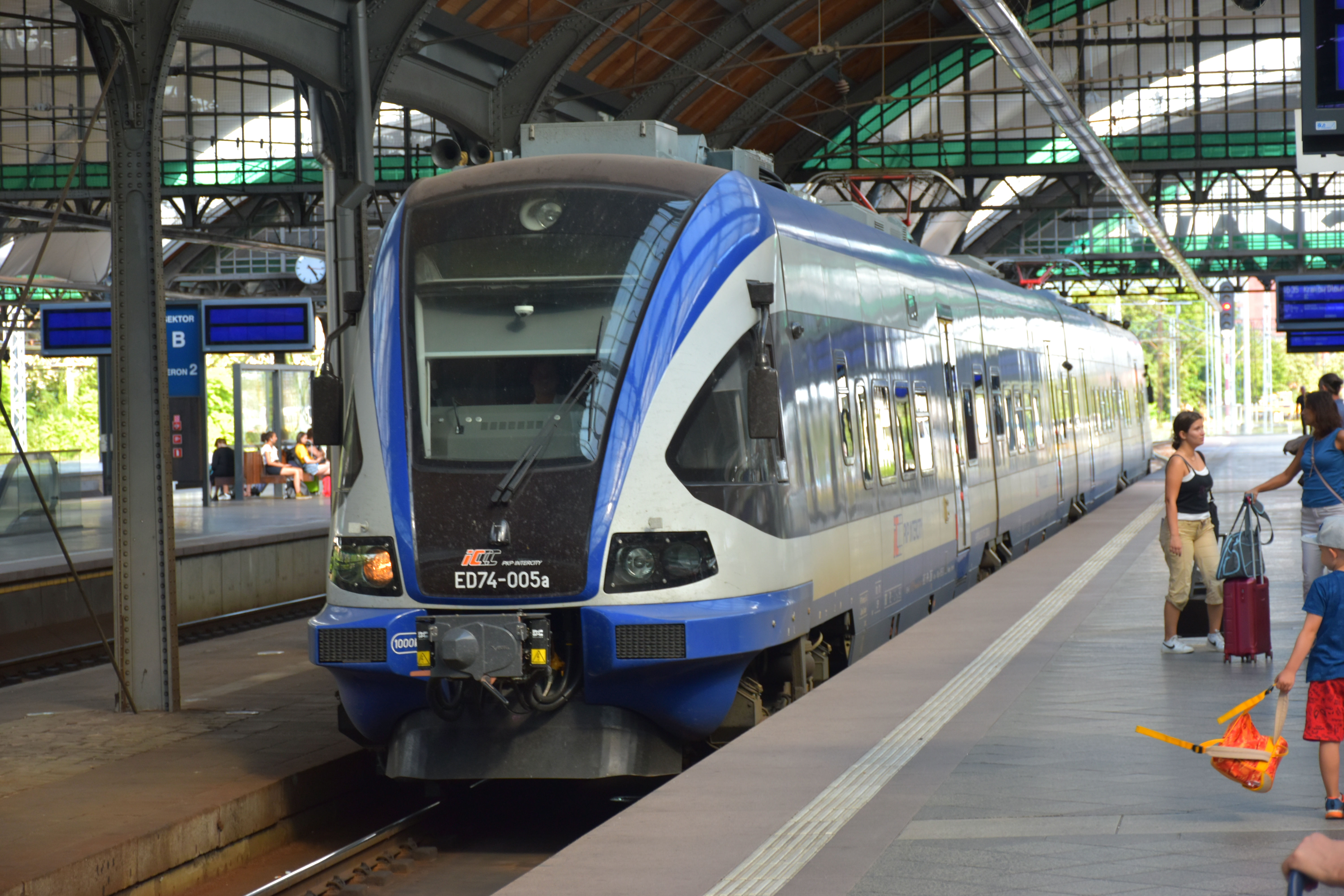
- ED74-005 at the Wrocław Główny railway station
- Stock type: electric multiple unit
- Manufacturer: Pesa Bydgoszcz
- Assembly: Poland
- Constructed: 2007–2008
- Number built: 14
- Capacity: 310 (194+8 seats)

Specifications
- Train length: 80,330 millimetres (263.55 ft)
- Width: 2,870 millimetres (9.42 ft)
- Height: 4,360 millimetres (14.30 ft)
- Platform height: 1,000 millimetres (3.3 ft)
- Wheel diameter: 840 millimetres (2.76 ft)
- Maximum speed: 160 km/h (100 mph)
- Weight: 158.9 tonnes (350,000 lb)
- Engine type: TMF59-39-4
- Power output: 2,000 kW
- Electric system: 3 kV DC
- AAR wheel arrangement: Bo’2’2’2’Bo’
- Braking system: Knorr + ED

Pesa Bydgostia (type 16WEk designated as series ED74, with car types 310Bak, 411Bak, 411Bbk, and 310Bbk) is a four-car standard-gauge electric multiple unit of Polish production, manufactured by Pesa Bydgoszcz upon order from Polregio, with a total of 14 units produced. In December 2008, they were transferred to PKP Intercity. The train set is a developmental version of the Pesa Acatus train.

== History ==
After World War II, electric multiple units were produced exclusively by Pafawag in Wrocław until 1997. Pafawag was the manufacturer of the most popular electric multiple unit series in Poland, the EN57. Following its privatization in the 1990s, Pafawag ceased the production of these rolling stock, with the last unit produced being the ED73 in 1997. For several years, no electric multiple units were produced in Poland.

During this period, Polish State Railways and later local governments primarily purchased diesel railcars and diesel multiple units due to the dominance of fuel-intensive diesel locomotives on non-electrified lines. This allowed Polish manufacturers and operators to gain experience in the production and operation of lightweight rail vehicles. Additionally, the EN57 electric multiple units owned by Polish operators were modernized.

Electric multiple units from new manufacturers began to appear on Polish tracks in 2004. Since then, tenders for the supply of electric multiple units have been won by three manufacturers: Pesa Bydgoszcz (formerly ZNTK Bydgoszcz), Newag (formerly ZNTK Nowy Sącz), and Stadler Rail. Pesa, after undergoing a significant restructuring in 1998, initially focused on producing railbuses from 2001 but began constructing its first electric multiple units in 2004 for the Warsaw Commuter Railway – the 13WE (EN95). Despite plans to purchase 10 units, production ceased after just one unit. In 2005, Pesa developed a project to produce the first electric multiple units adapted for 3,000 V DC voltage in both 3 and 4-car versions. The first prototype was the 4-car Acatus, tested initially as a 4-car unit (ED74-01, type 16WE) and later as a 3-car unit (ED59-01, type 15WE), which significantly reduced the number of tests required for the slightly later ordered 4-car Bydgostia units.

== Construction ==
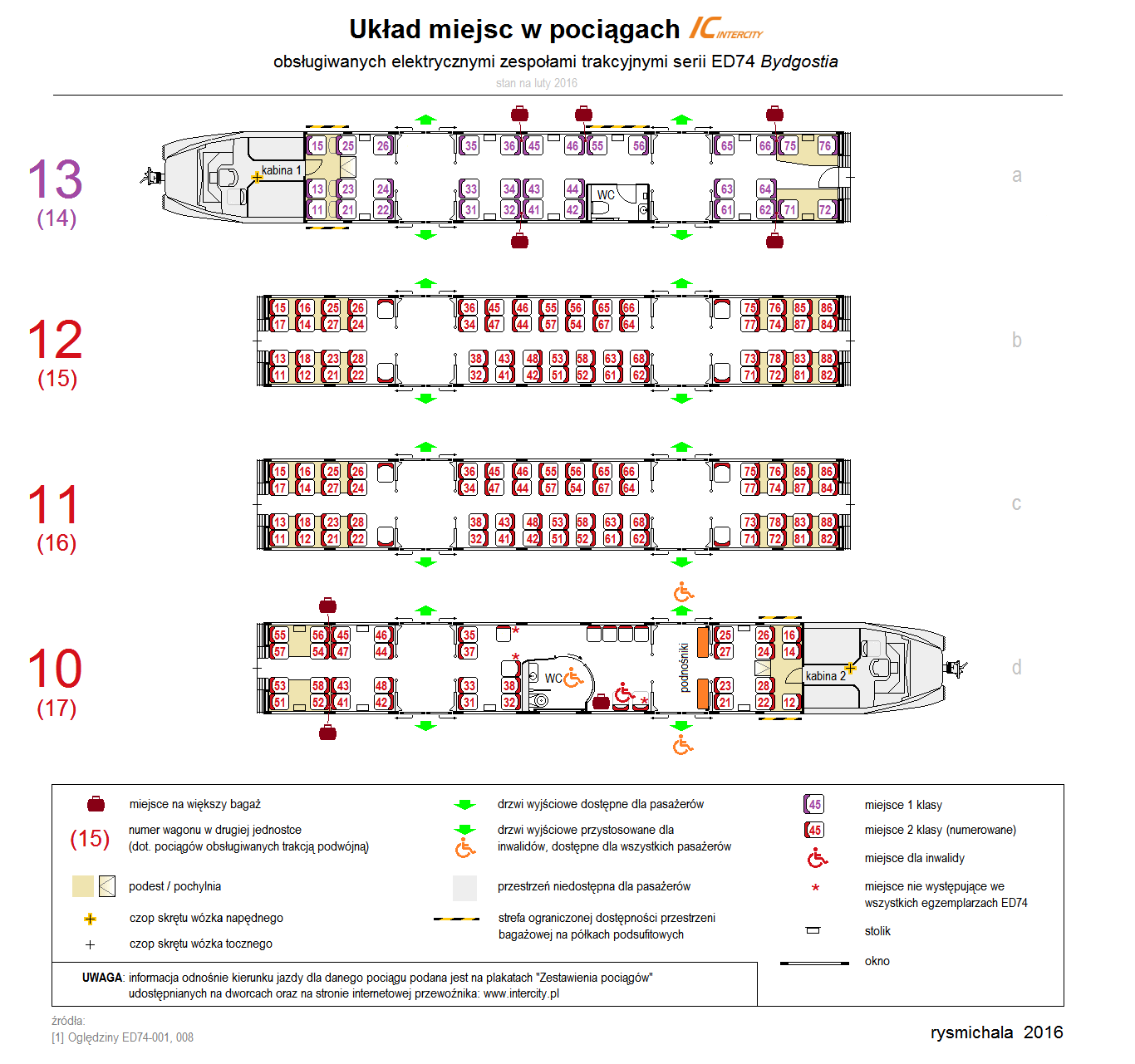
Layout in 2016

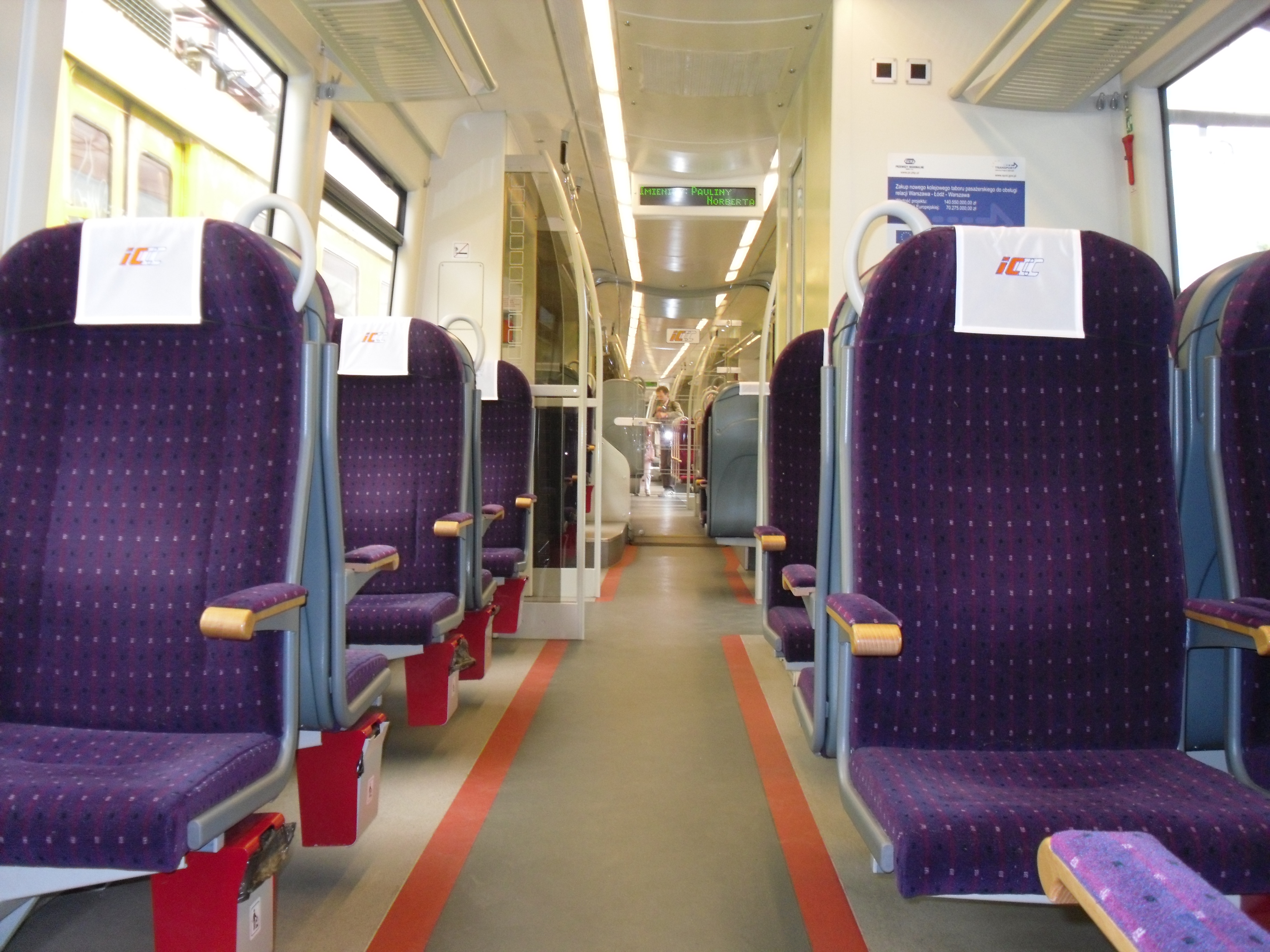
First class interior in 2009

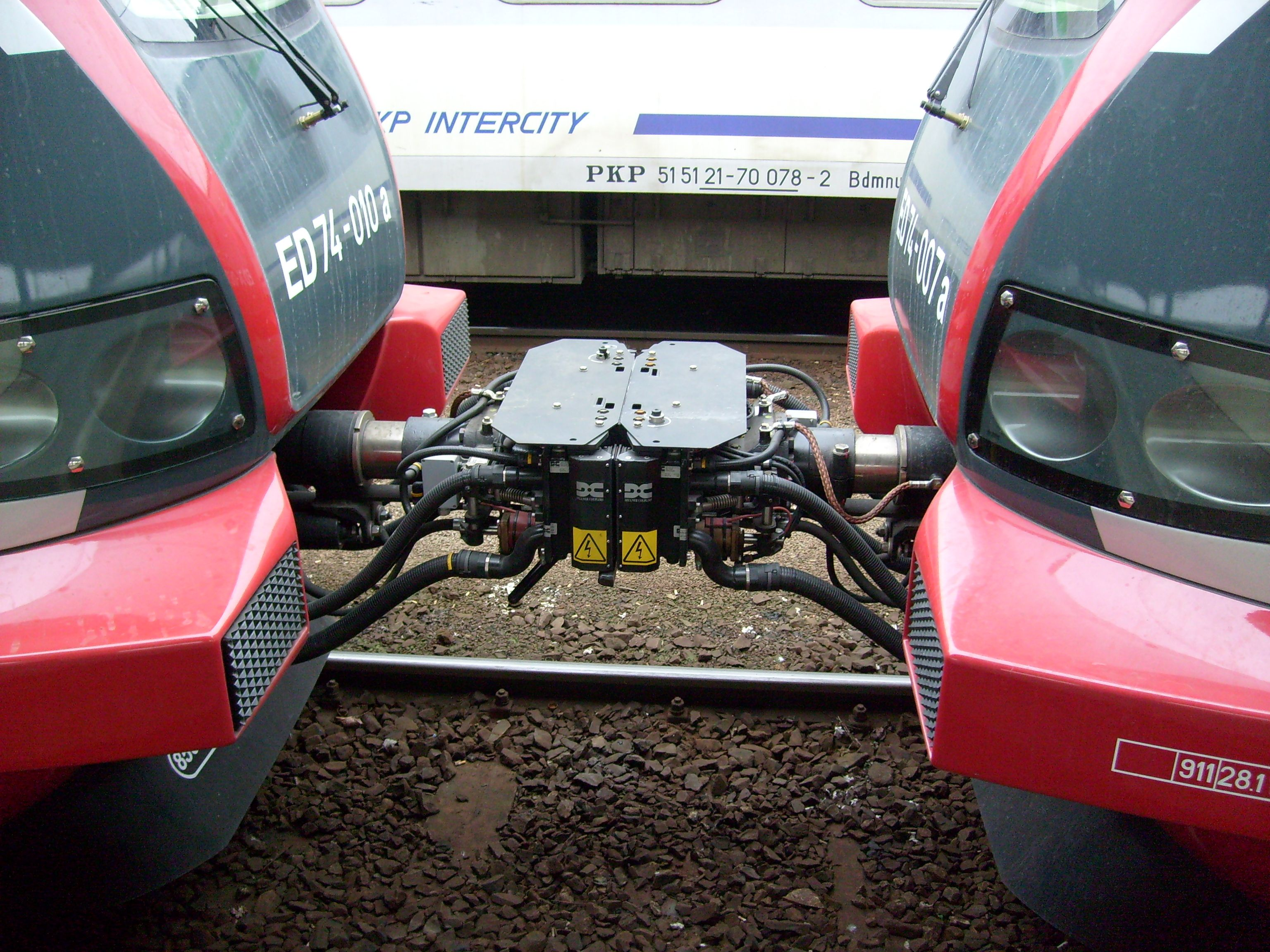
Coupling

The Bydgostia is a four-car, single-space train designed for inter-regional passenger transport. Each car features two pairs of doors on each side, designed to accommodate platforms ranging from 300 to 1,000 mm in height. For lower platforms, steps extend to facilitate boarding. The first and last bogies are powered 22MNK bogies with a wheelbase of 2,500 mm, while the intermediate Jacobs bogies are non-powered 37ANK bogies, also with an axle base of 2,500 mm. The wheel diameter is 850 mm. Due to the method of connecting the cars, shortening or lengthening the train is not feasible during operation, although up to 3 trains can be coupled for multiple-unit train control. However, due to high power consumption, they are typically operated in pairs.

A mixed seating arrangement is used, with seats arranged in rows and groups. The ED74-01 is equipped with 179 fixed and 8 folding seats in second class and 21 in first class. After its production, a decision was made to implement changes: the interior layout was altered, bicycle racks were removed, and only first-class seats were installed. Consequently, subsequent units have 161 fixed and 8 folding seats in second class and 33 in first class. In 2014, during level P4 maintenance, the seating layout of the first unit was standardized to match the others.

Both end cars contain closed-system toilets, and the D car includes space for passengers with reduced mobility or large luggage. Nearby, there are lifts for disabled passengers. All cars are equipped with air conditioning, displays, a sound system, and surveillance.

The vehicles are equipped with standard train protection systems: vigilance control, automatic train braking, and Radio-Stop.

=== Modernizations ===
During the first annual inspection in 2008, seat arrangements were modified: one row of seats was removed in the middle sections between vestibules, and in the end sections, group seating was replaced with row seating, creating additional seats near the entrance doors. Additionally, two folding seats were added near the WC in the D cars, and first-class seats were recolored for easier distinction from second-class seats.

In 2009, an additional seat for an assistant driver was installed, allowing the trains to exceed speeds of 130 km/h.

In early 2014, the first trains underwent level 4 maintenance, during which they were repainted in PKP Intercity colors.

In June 2019, further modernizations of the ED74 units began at ZNTK Mińsk Mazowiecki, including the removal of half the entrance doors, reduction of window areas, interior reconfiguration, and replacement of inverters and converters.

== Operation ==
=== PKP Polregio ===
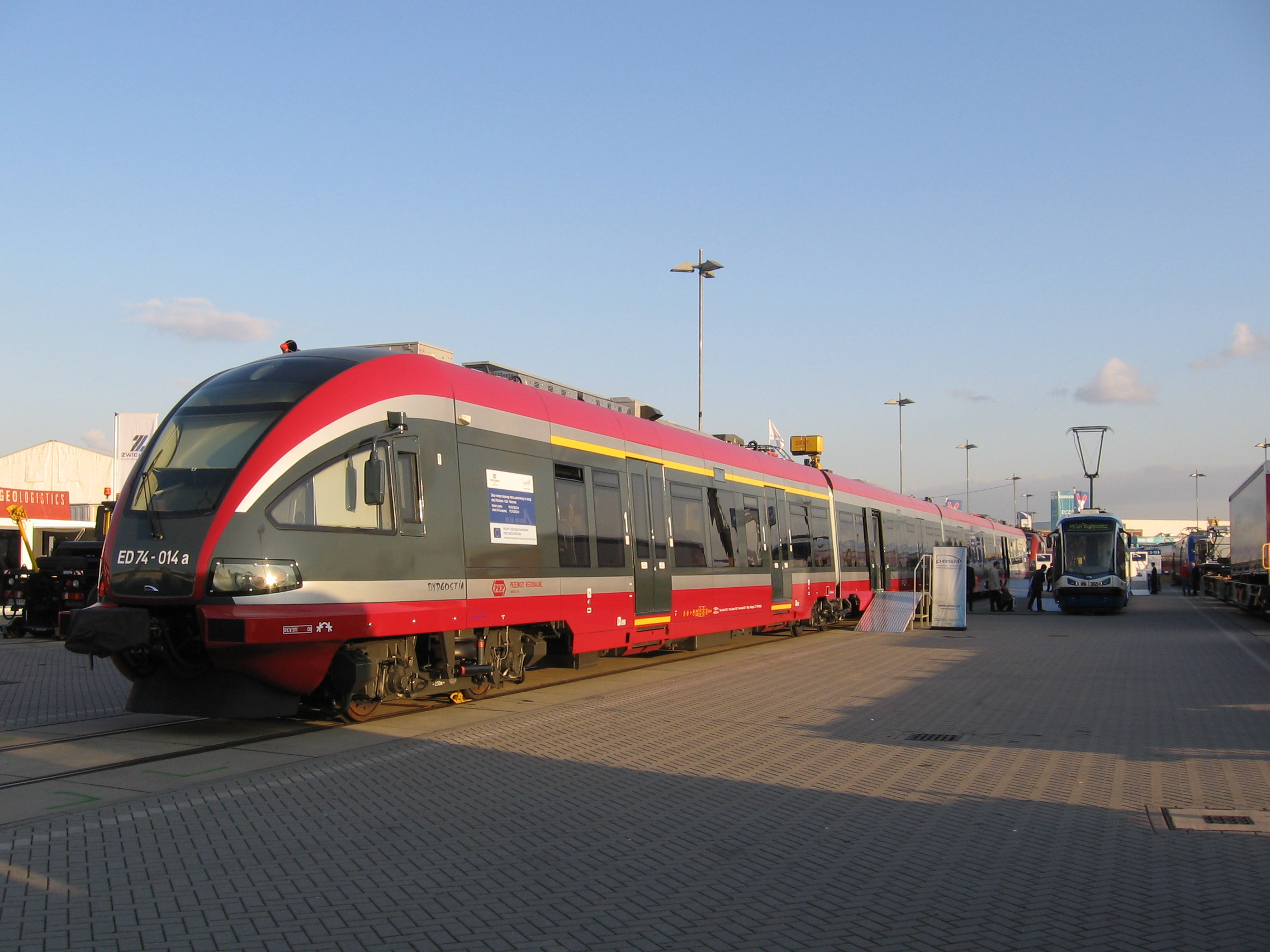
ED74 in PKP Polregio livery at InnoTrans 2008

On 16 December 2005, a contract was signed with PKP Polregio for the delivery of 11 units to serve the Warsaw–Łódź route. The purchase was financed by the European Regional Development Fund under the EU Sectoral Operational Program for Transport, along with government budget contributions.

In early June 2007, the first set was completed and sent for trial runs to obtain operational approval. On 23 August 2007, an official presentation of the ED74 took place at Warszawa Centralna railway station, followed by a trip to Łódź. The next day, two coupled ED74 units operated the first scheduled train. On October 31, an amendment to the contract increased the order to 14 units. The initially ordered 11 sets were delivered by the end of 2007, and by summer 2008, an additional 3 sets were delivered.

On October 10, ED74-005 was presented at the Trako Fair in Oliwa, and from 23 to 26 September 2008, ED74-014 was displayed at InnoTrans in Berlin.

In December 2008, the units were transferred to PKP Intercity to operate Twoje Linie Kolejowe, replacing discontinued express trains previously run by PKP Polregio.

=== PKP Intercity ===
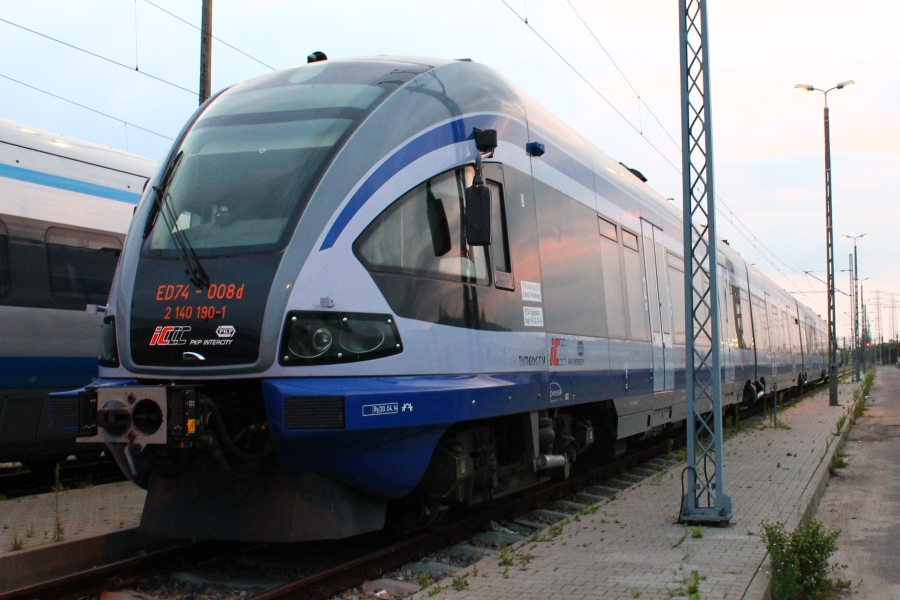
ED74 in PKP Intercity colors

Initially, the units served the Warsaw–Łódź route for which they were purchased. On 29 December 2009, a separation occurred between two coupled sets during departure, leading the Office of Rail Transport to prohibit coupling until the issue was resolved. The incident was deemed isolated, and by January 9, the sets resumed running in pairs but with a driver in both units. In summer 2010, some sets were reassigned to the Łódź–Terespol route. From 13 December 2010, the sets also served routes such as Kraków–Białystok, Białystok–Katowice, Warsaw East–Poznań, Kraków–Warsaw East, and Katowice–Warsaw East. Later, they also operated routes like Kraków–Zakopane, Kraków–Wrocław, Warsaw West–Biała Podlaska, and Warsaw West–Terespol.

In 2011, four sets were leased back, followed by another four in 2012.

By February 2015, only 5 out of 14 units were operational, with the rest awaiting repairs. In September, 7 units were operational, but repair delays persisted due to difficulties in finding suitable roles for the units. By November, 7 units remained in service on routes linking Warsaw with Kraków, Piła, and Terespol, while the other 7 were out of service. In 2016, the prosecutor's office launched an investigation into the failure to perform mandatory maintenance on the trains.

In 2014, different operators sought to acquire the unused ED74 sets from PKP Intercity, but no ownership changes occurred. In April 2016, after purchasing other electric multiple units, PKP Intercity announced plans to sell the ED74 sets due to their unsuitability for long-distance service. It was planned that 7 units would be sold first, followed by another 3 at the end of 2016, and the last 4 in the second quarter of 2017. At that time, 5 units of this series were still in operation, servicing connections from Płaszów to Łódź Kaliska, Terespol, and Białystok. At the end of August, the technical dialogue announced by PKP Intercity saw participation from Lesser Poland Railways, Polregio, and Silesian Railways. Lesser Poland Railways expressed interest in purchasing all 14 ED74 units and began negotiations with PKP Intercity, while Polregio submitted an offer to lease all vehicles with an option to purchase them later, and Silesian Railways did not submit any offer.

On 17 October 2016, PKP Intercity announced the intention to dispose of 14 ED74 series electric multiple units. At that time, all the vehicles were located in Bieżanów, with half of them operational and the other half awaiting P4 repairs. In the 2016/2017 timetable, the units were assigned to serve only the Wit Stwosz route between Kraków and Terespol.

In early December 2016, the carrier was analyzing the submitted offers and anticipated that the sale of the vehicles would be finalized by mid-2017. Ultimately, at the end of April 2017, PKP Intercity canceled the sale proceedings and decided that the units would be returned to service. In October, the carrier announced that all ED74 units would undergo P5 level repairs along with modernization. Afterward, they would be based in Wrocław and would serve InterCity category trains from Wrocław to Lublin and Kielce, as well as from Kraków to Lublin. Pesa and H. Cegielski expressed interest in carrying out these repairs. In January 2019, bids were opened in the tender for the modernization of the units, with Pesa submitting the only offer. However, the proposed price was higher than the cost of purchasing new units. On 27 June 2019, a contract was signed for the modernization of 14 ED74 series units, which was expected to take up to 48 months. Even before the contract was signed, the transport of the units from Prokocim, where they had been stored, to the facilities in Mińsk Mazowiecki began.

On 10 December 2017, with the introduction of the new timetable, the units were assigned exclusively to serve the Twoje Linie Kolejowe Kinga route between Kraków and Warsaw via Kielce and Radom. In June, the Kinga route was discontinued, and the units were reassigned to the Cyryl route between Kraków and Poznań, where they operated until the end of the 2018 summer season. After the summer, the units again began servicing the reinstated Kinga route. Between July and August 2019, one unit was assigned to the Intercity Galicja route between Przemyśl and Kraków.

The first modernized unit was ready in March 2021, and on 12 December 2021, the first two modernized units completed their first trip on the Wrocław–Przemyśl route. By the end of 2022, 12 modernized units had been delivered. In spring 2023, the modernization of the last two units was completed, with the final unit, ED74-014, leaving the Mińsk Mazowiecki facility on May 31.

=== Reception ===
The ED74 units faced much criticism due to the insufficient number of toilets, lack of compartments, and uncomfortable, tightly arranged seats. However, the units were designed for short connections of up to 90 minutes of travel, hence the characteristic seats criticized for their shape. Meanwhile, they were deployed on the Warsaw to Łódź route, where travel time due to renovations lasted about 2 hours until 2015, and later on even longer routes. Additionally, especially in the initial period, there were issues with electronics, heating, and retractable steps.

== Awards and recognitions ==
- 2007 – medal from the President of the Association of Polish Electrical Engineers at the Trako trade fair in Oliwa.
