= Bieżanów-Prokocim =

- Dzielnica of Kraków
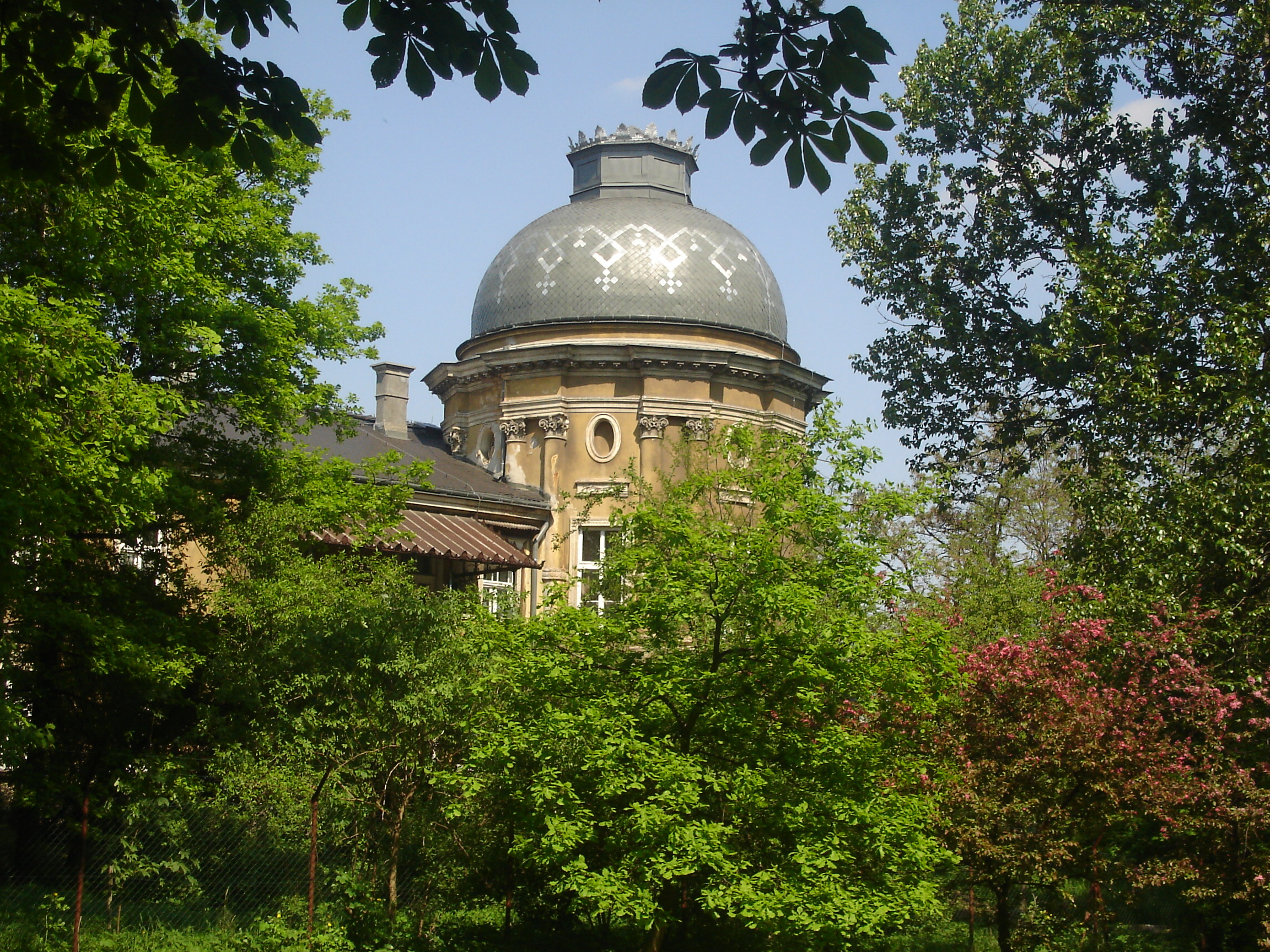

- Location of Bieżanów-Prokocim within Kraków
- Coordinates: 50°0′58.78″N 20°1′52.18″E
- Country: Poland
- Voivodeship: Lesser Poland
- County/City: Kraków

Government
  - President: Zbigniew Kożuch

Area
  - Total: 18.47 km^{2} (7.13 sq mi)

Population (2020)
  - Total: 63 029
  - Density: 3.4/km^{2} (8.8/sq mi)
- Time zone: UTC+1 (CET)
  - Summer (DST): UTC+2 (CEST)
- Area code: +48 12
- Website: http://www.dzielnica12.krakow.pl

Bieżanów-Prokocim is one of 18 districts of Kraków, located in the southeast part of the city. The name Bieżanów-Prokocim comes from two villages that are now parts of the district.

According to the Central Statistical Office data, the district's area is 18.47 square kilometres (7.13 square miles) and 63 029 people inhabit Bieżanów-Prokocim at the density of 3,413 people per square kilometre (8,840 people/mi^{2}).

== Subdivisions of Bieżanów-Prokocim ==
Bieżanów-Prokocim is divided into smaller subdivisions (osiedles). Here's a list of them.

- Bieżanów
- Bieżanów Kolonia
- Kaim
- Łazy
- Osiedle Kolejowe
- Osiedle Medyków
- Osiedle Na Kozłówce
- Osiedle Nad Potokiem
- Osiedle Nowy Bieżanów
- Osiedle Nowy Prokocim
- Osiedle Parkowe
- Osiedle Złocień
- Prokocim
- Rżąka
