= Lesser Poland Railways =

Railway company in Poland

- Koleje Małopolskie
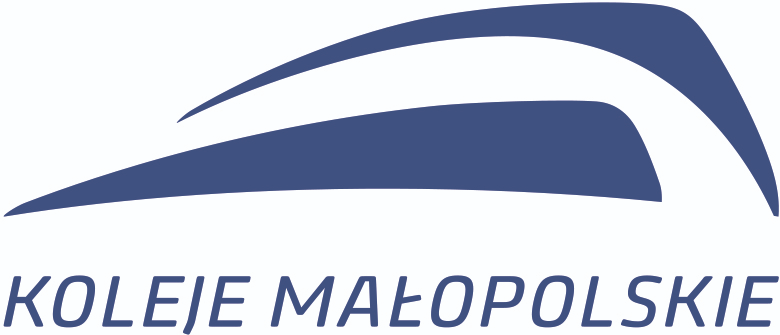

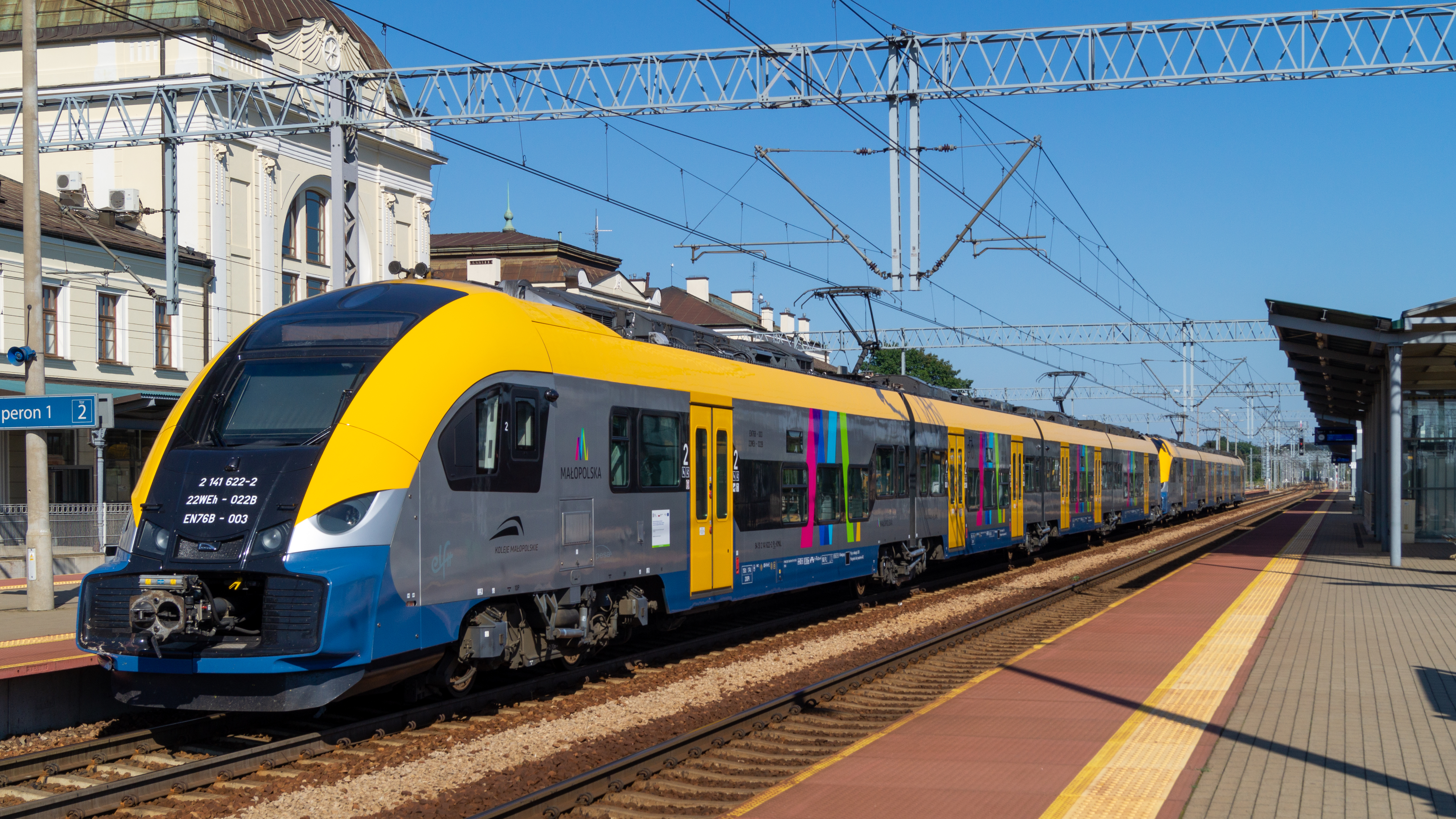
- EN76B-003 of Lesser Poland Railways at Tarnów

Overview
- Main region: Lesser Poland Voivodeship
- Headquarters: Kraków, Poland
- Key people: Radosław Włoszek CEO; Paweł Pachoł Deputy CEO
- Reporting mark: KMŁ; KMAL
- Dates of operation: 2 December 2013–present

Other
- Website: www.kolejemalopolskie.com.pl
Route map

Lesser Poland Railways (Polish: Koleje Małopolskie; KMŁ) is a regional rail operator in the Lesser Poland Voivodeship of Poland.

== History ==
The company was founded on 2 December 2013 and is owned by the Lesser Poland Voivodeship, to handle local passenger traffic in the Voivodeship. It started operations on 6 November 2014. The railway was founded to reduce the congestion on the Kraków - Wieliczka line, reducing the travel time to 21 minutes. The Wieliczka Salt Mine connection is considered to be the main popular station, the local council built a new Park & Ride near Wieliczka Park and Wieliczka Rynek railway stations.

From 14 December 2014 Lesser Poland Railways began transporting passengers on the route Kraków Główny – Wieliczka Rynek-Kopalnia with modern and air conditioned trains. The travel time is 21 minutes, and the train will begin the route at 05:00 to 23:00 every thirty minutes. In 2015 after renovations the route was extended to Kraków Balice which has direct access to the John Paul II International Airport, taking over the former Balice Ekspres train operated by Polregio.

== Rolling stock ==
Class	Number	Seat number	Top speed	Cars number
EN64 Acatus Plus	4	133+5	160 km/h	3
EN77 Acatus II	5	180+13	160 km/h	4
EN76B Elf II	4	200	160 km/h	4
EN78 Impuls	8	200	160 km/h	4
EN78A Impuls II	4	189	160 km/h	4
EN79 Impuls	5	250	160 km/h	5
EN57AL	6	175	120 km/h	4

== Routes ==
Source: Train connections – Lesser Poland Railways (in English and Polish)

- SKA1 Wieliczka Rynek-Kopalnia – Kraków – Kraków Airport
- SKA2 Kraków – Miechów – Sędziszów
- SKA2 Kraków – Skawina – Zator – Oświęcim
- SKA3 Kraków – Tarnów
- SKA3 Kraków – Trzebinia – Oświęcim
- K7 Kraków – Nowy Sącz – Krynica-Zdrój
- K71 Kraków / Krynica-Zdrój – Jasło
- K5 Kraków – Zakopane
- M7 Muszyna – Poprad-Tatry

Most routes are jointly operated with Polregio.
