= Żary (disambiguation) =

Żary is a town in Lubusz Voivodeship, Poland.

Żary, Zary, or Žáry may also refer to:

== Places in Poland ==
- Żary County, county in Lubusz Voivodeship, seated at the town of Żary
  - Gmina Żary, gmina in the county, seated at the town
  - Kunice, Żary, district of Żary
- Żary, Łódź Voivodeship (central Poland)
- Żary, Lublin Voivodeship (east Poland)
- Żary, Lesser Poland Voivodeship (south Poland)

== People ==
- Andrei Zary Broder, American computer scientist
- Connor Zary (born 2001), Canadian ice hockey centre
- Štefan Žáry (1918–2007), Slovak poet

== Transport ==
- Żary railway station, Lubusz Voivodeship
- Żary Muzyków railway station, Lubusz Voivodeship
- Żary Kunice railway station, Lubusz Voivodeship
- Żary railway station, former name (1945–1946) of Żarów railway station

== See also ==
- Żarów
