= Żary Muzyków railway station =

Railway station in western Poland

Żary Muzyków

General information
- Location: Muzyków neighbourhood, Żary, Lubusz Voivodeship; Poland
- Coordinates: 51°38′35.1″N 15°06′59.5″E
- Owner: Polish State Railways
- Line: Zielona Góra–Żary railway
- Platforms: 1

History
- Opened: 19 December 2024; 22 months ago

Services
Preceding station	Polregio	Following station
Żary towards Görlitz	PR	Grabik towards Zielona Góra Główna
Location
- Location within Poland

Żary Muzyków is a railway station on the Zielona Góra–Żary railway in the Muzyków neighbourhood of Żary, within the Lubusz Voivodeship in western Poland.

== History ==
Part of the Governmental Programme for the Construction or Modernisation of Railway Stops for 2021–2025, Żary Muzyków was constructed at a cost of approximately 2.5 million Polish Złoty. The new station opened on 19 December 2025.

== Train services ==
The station is served by the following service(s):

- Regional services (R) Görlitz - Żary - Zielona Góra
