= Żary Kunice railway station =

Railway station in western Poland

Żary Kunice
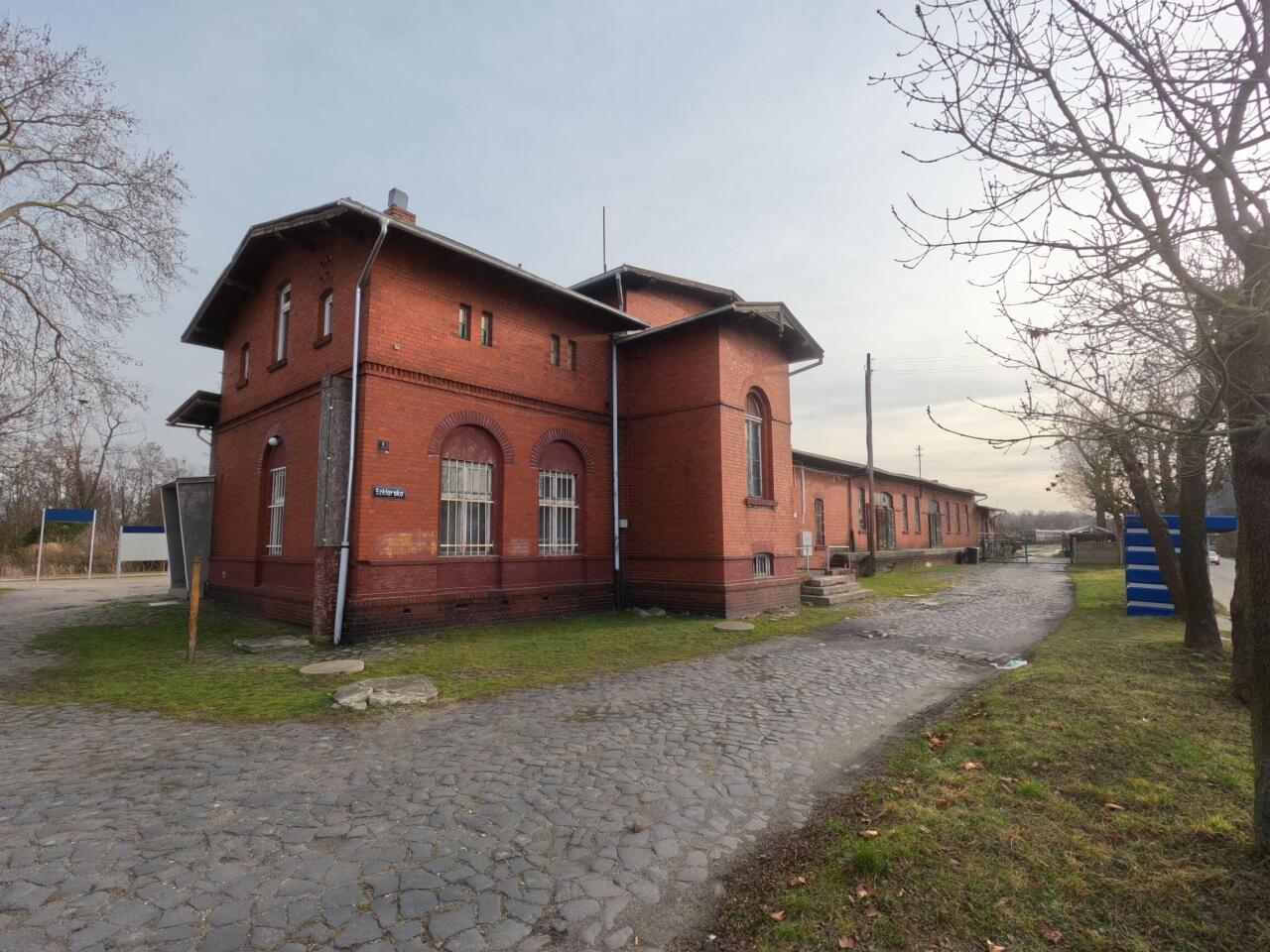
- Station building in January 2023

General information
- Location: Kunice, Żary, Lubusz Voivodeship; Poland
- Coordinates: 51°35′57.0″N 15°09′56.0″E
- Owner: Polish State Railways
- Line: Miłkowice–Jasień railway
- Platforms: 2

History
- Opened: 1879
- Former names: Kunzendorf (1879–1912); Kunzendorf (Niederlaus) (1912–1945); Kunice Żarowskie (1945–1946); Kunice Żarskie (1946–1973)

Services
Preceding station	Polregio	Following station
Jankowa Żagańska towards Görlitz	PR	Żary towards Zielona Góra Główna
Location
- Location within Poland

Żary Kunice (German: Kunzendorf) is a railway station on the Miłkowice–Jasień railway in the Kunice district of Żary, within the Lubusz Voivodeship in western Poland.

== History ==
The station opened in 1879 as Kunzendorf, which was later renamed to Kunzendorf (Niederlaus) in 1912. After World War II, the area came under Polish administration. As a result, the station was taken over by Polish State Railways. The station was renamed to Kunice Żarowskie and later to its modern name, Żary Kunice in 1973.

Many sidings once branched off the station. Tracks to a former brickyard branched off south-west of the station, along with a narrow-gauge railway leading to Mirostowice Górne once used by the Vitrosilicon and the Saint Gobain glassworks . All these sidings are now dismantled. The last remaining tracks also lead to the Vitrosilicon glassworks but instead branch off north-east of the station.

== Train services ==
The station is served by the following service(s):

- Regional services (R) Görlitz - Żary - Zielona Góra
