= Kunice, Żary =

District of Żary, Poland

Kunice
- District of Żary
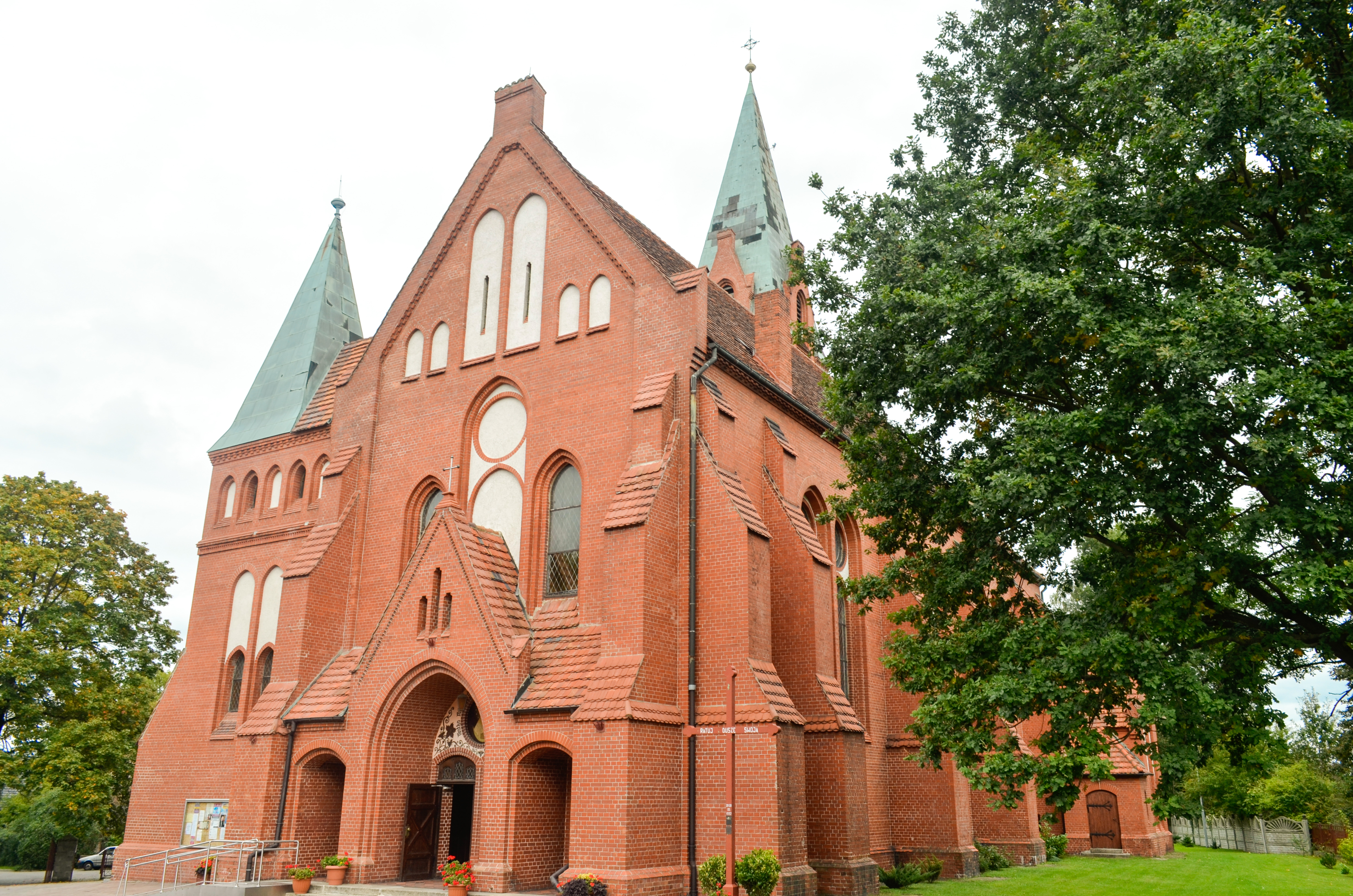
- Church of Our Lady of the Scapular

- Location within Poland
- Coordinates: 51°36′10.0″N 15°10′35.0″E
- Country: Poland
- Voivodeship: Lubusz
- County: Żary
- City: Żary
- First mentioned: 1346
- Within town limits: 1973
- Area: 6.7 km^{2} (2.6 sq mi)
- Time zone: UTC+1 (CET)
  - Summer (DST): UTC+2 (CEST)
- Postal code: 68-205
- Area code: +48 68
- Vehicle registration: FZA

Kunice (German: Kunzendorf) is a district in the town of Żary, in the Lubusz Voivodeship in western Poland.

== History ==
The settlement was first mentioned in 1346.

== Transport ==
Żary Kunice railway station serves the district with regional services operated by Polregio.
