= PKP class SM04 =

SM04
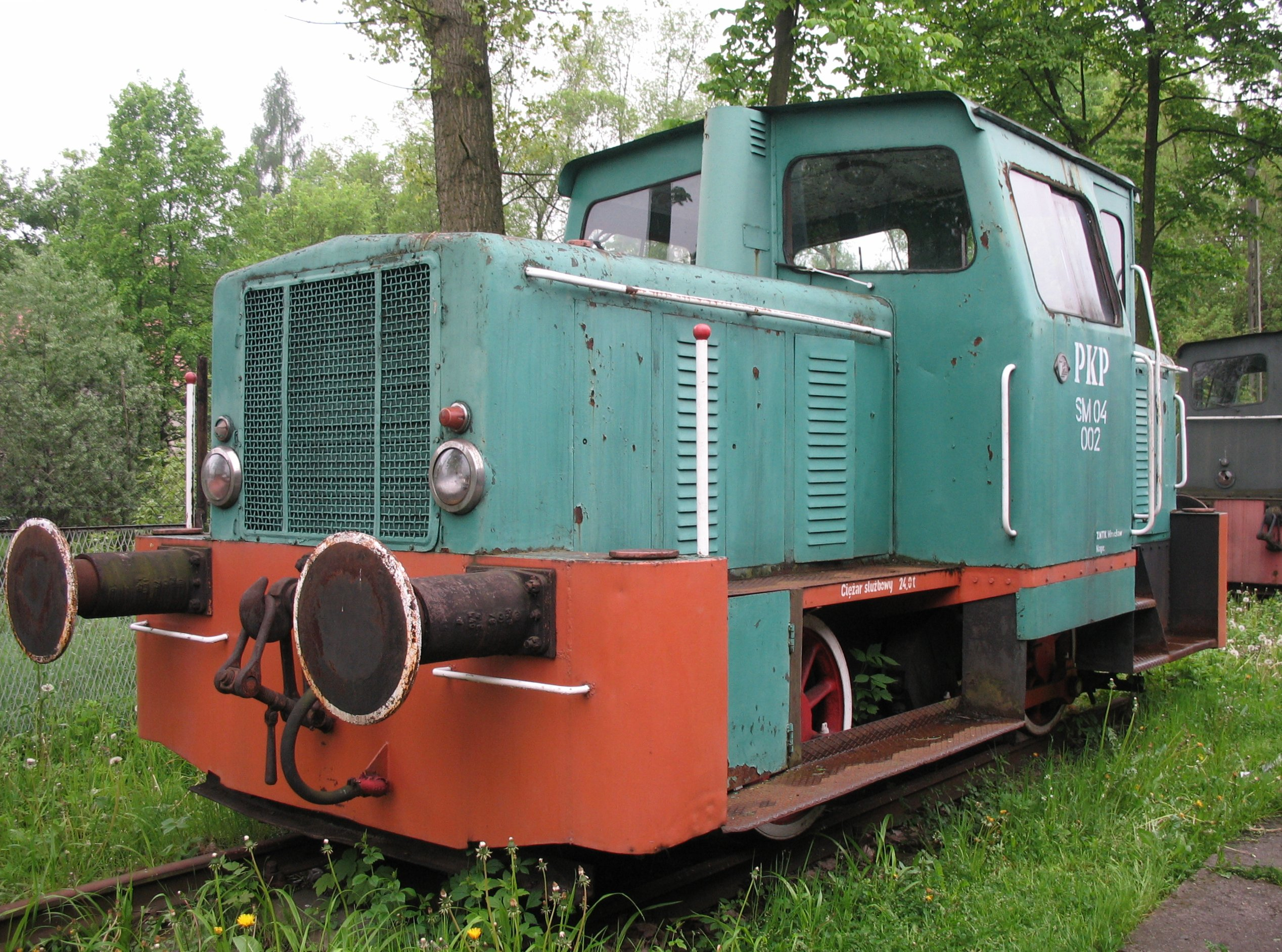
- SM04-002 at Chabówka Railway Museum
Type and origin
- Power type: Diesel
- Builder: Zastal POL
- Model: 409Da
- Build date: 1972, 1978
- Total produced: 2
Specifications
- Configuration
  - AAR: B
- Gauge: 1,435 mm (4 ft 8 1/2 in)
- Driver dia.: 950 mm
- Length: 6,940 mm
- Width: 2,970 mm
- Height: 3,380 mm
- Loco weight: 24 T
- Fuel capacity: 250 l
- Engine type: 10H6/14H6
- Cylinders: 6
- Transmission: Mechanical
- Loco brake: Knorr
Performance figures
- Maximum speed: 25.7 km/h (Ls150); 45.8 km/h (2LS150)
- Power output: 133 kW
- Tractive effort: 58.5 kN
Career
- Operators: PKP
- Class: SM04
- Locale: POL Poland
- Delivered: 1972, 1978

The SM04 (factory designation 409Da) is a low power, Polish built shunter, formerly operated by PKP (Polish National Railways) and is an improved version of the SM03.

== History ==
Built between 1972 and 1978, the SM04 differed from its predecessor in that its construction allowed for the installation of a more powerful diesel engine, built under licence from Henschel. Originally, this engine was to be the 10H6, which had a power output of 160 bhp; however the 180 bhp 14H6 was used instead.

The SM04 was mainly sold to industry, where they carried their factory designation of 409Da. A mere 2 examples were acquired by PKP at the beginning of the 1990s. Both locomotives had been salvaged from Zakłady Naprawcze Taboru Kolejowego w Sędziszowie (Sędziszów Rolling Stock Reparation Plant), but were removed from PKP's inventory in 2000. One of these is now stationed as an exhibit at the railway museum in Chabówka.

== Locomotive assignment ==
Loco nos.	Operator	Remarks
002	Chabówka Railway Museum	Exhibit

== See also ==
- Polish locomotives designation
