= Żary railway station =

Railway station in Żary, Poland

Żary
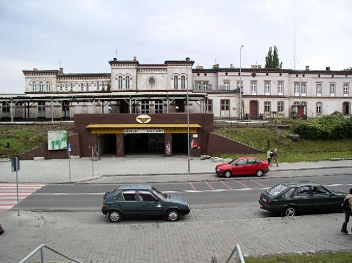
- Żary railway station

General information
- Location: Żary, Lubusz Voivodeship; Poland
- System: Railway Station
- Operator: PKP Polskie Linie Kolejowe
- Lines: 14: Łódź-Forst (Lausitz) railway 282: Miłkowice–Jasień railway 370: Żary–Zielona Góra railway Żary–Legnica railway
- Platforms: 5
- Tracks: 6

History
- Opened: 1846; 180 years ago
- Former names: Żary koło Żagania, Sorau

Services
| Preceding station | KD | Following station |
|---|---|---|
| Legnica towards Wrocław Główny | D25 | Sieniawa Żarska towards Forst (Lausitz) |
| Żagań towards Wrocław Główny | D99 | Forst (Lausitz) towards Berlin-Lichtenberg |
Location
- Location within Poland

Żary is a railway station serving the town of Żary, in the Lubusz Voivodeship, Poland. The station opened in 1846 and is located on the Łódź-Forst railway, Miłkowice–Jasień railway, Żary–Zielona Góra railway and Żary–Legnica railway. The train services are operated by Lower Silesian Railways, PKP Intercity and Polregio.

== Train services ==
The station is served by the following services:

- Regional services (R) Forst (Lausitz) – Żary – Żagań
- Regional services (R) Zielona Góra Główna – Żary – Żagań
- Regional services (R) Zielona Góra Główna – Żary – Węgliniec – Zgorzelec – Görlitz
- Regional services (Os) Żary – Żagań – Legnica
- Regional services (OsP) Forst (Lausitz) – Żary – Żagań – Legnica – Wrocław Główny
- Regional services (P) Berlin Lichtenberg – Cottbus – Forst (Lausitz) – Żary – Żagań – Legnica – Wrocław Główny
- Express services (TLK) Zielona Góra Główna – Żary – Legnica – Wrocław Główny – Opole Główne – Częstochowa – Koluszki – Warszawa Wschodnia

| Preceding station | Lower Silesian Railways | Following station |
|---|---|---|
| terminus | Os - local train | Żagań toward Legnica |
| Sieniawa Żarska toward Forst (Lausitz) | OsP - express local train | Żagań toward Wrocław Główny |
| Forst (Lausitz) toward Berlin Lichtenberg | P - premium local train | Żagań toward Wrocław Główny |
| Preceding station | PKP Intercity | Following station |
| Nowogród Osiedle toward Zielona Góra Główna | TLK - Twoje Linie Kolejowe - "Your Rail Lines" | Żagań toward Warszawa Wschodnia |
| Preceding station | Polregio | Following station |
| Sieniawa Żarska toward Forst (Lausitz) | R - REGIO | Żagań (terminus) |
| Lubanice toward Zielona Góra Główna | R - REGIO | Żagań (terminus) |
| Lubanice toward Zielona Góra Główna | R - REGIO | Żary Kunice toward Görlitz |

Until mid-December 2014 the station was also served by EuroCity "Wawel", which used to run once daily between Berlin Hauptbahnhof and Wrocław Główny.
