= Zielona Góra–Żary railway =

Railway line in western Poland

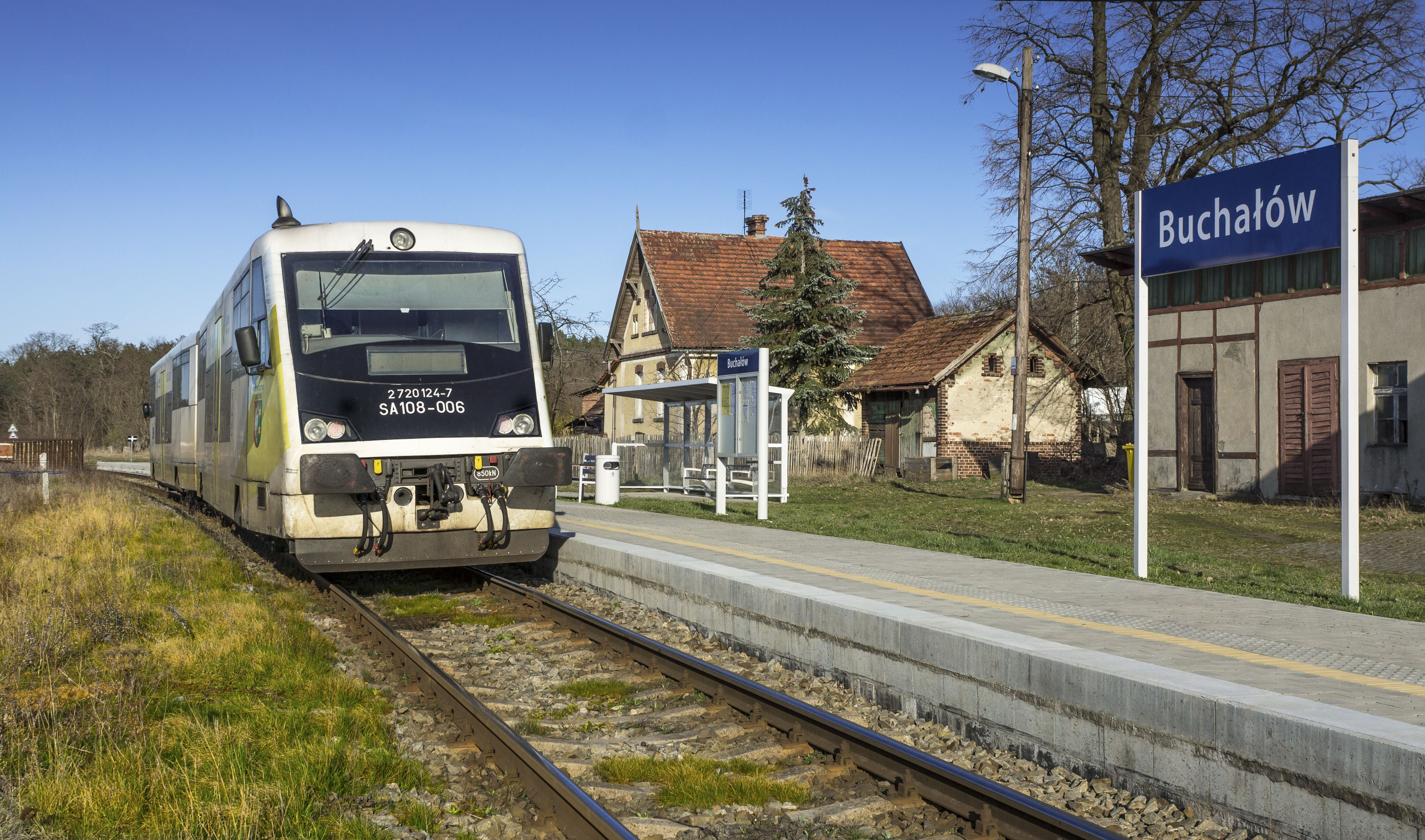
- Railbus SA-108 at Buchałów

Overview
- Line number: PKP 370
- Locale: Lubusz Voivodeship, Poland
- Termini: Zielona Góra; Żary

History
- Opened: 10 November 1895; 130 years ago (first section)

Technical
- Line length: 58.884 km (36.589 mi)
- Number of tracks: 1
- Track gauge: 1,435 mm (4 ft 8 1/2 in) standard gauge
- Operating speed: 40–120 km/h (25–75 mph)
Route map
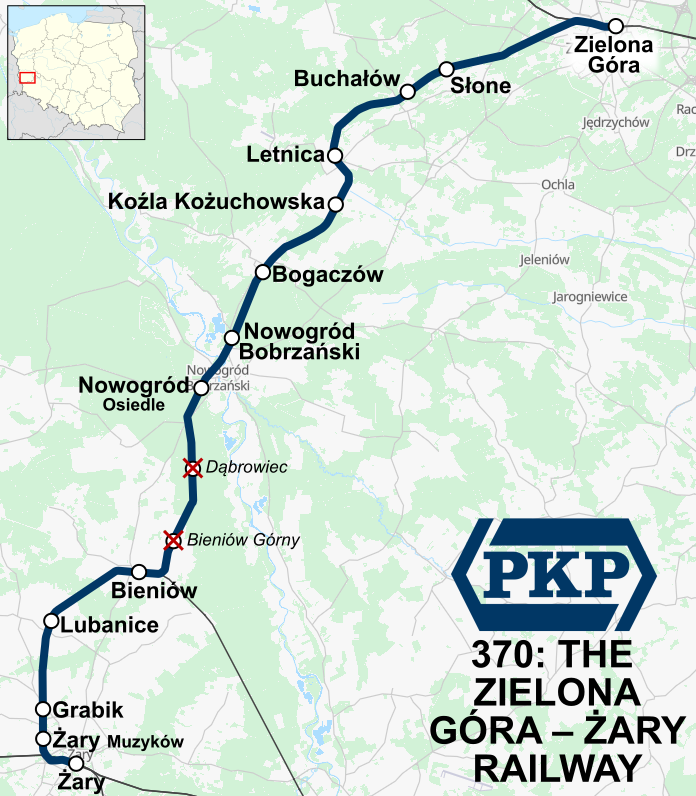

The Zielona Góra–Żary railway is an unelectrified single-track railway line connecting Zielona Góra Główna railway station in Zielona Góra and Żary railway station in Żary in the Lubusz Voivodeship of western Poland.

== History ==
Plans to connect Zielona Góra with Żary and Żagań by rail appeared as early as the 1840s. This was revisited in 1867 and 1872, when there was a proposal to build a line to Bautzen. The town of Nowogród Bobrzański required a rail connection for its industry. Because the line was to run through both Prussia and Saxony, separate permits were required. On 20 March 1875, a contract was granted to build the line to Prussia, however, the proposal to build the line to Saxony, was rejected.

As a result, on 17 March 1887, the decision was made to build the route solely within Prussia. The line was planned to terminate at Przewóz, beyond Żary. However, due to funding issues, the line was ultimately built to Żary.

The first section of the line opened on 11 October 1895 between Nowogród Bobrzański and Bieniów. The line was later extended to Żary on 1 September 1896, and eventually to Zielona Góra on 1 August 1904.

Bieniów Górny closed in 1953 and was later demolished the following year. This followed with the closure of Dąbrowiec in 1973, and later Słone, in 1991.

Part of the Governmental Programme for the Construction or Modernisation of Railway Stops for 2021–2025, Żary Muzyków opened on 19 December 2025. Słone re-opened on 15 December 2024.

== Train services ==
The line is served by the following service(s):

- Regional services (R) Görlitz - Żary - Zielona Góra

== Gallery ==
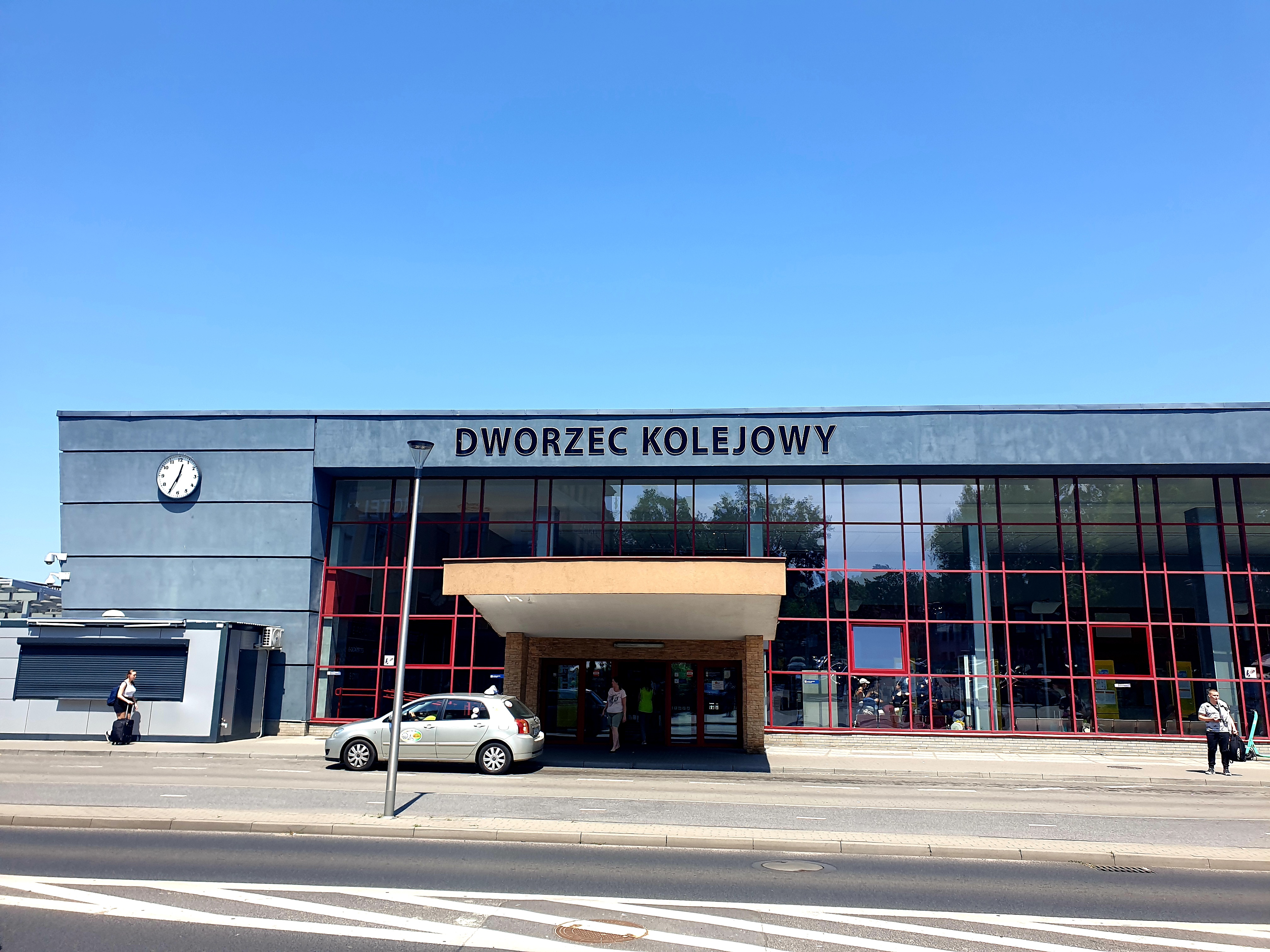
Zielona Góra Główna railway station

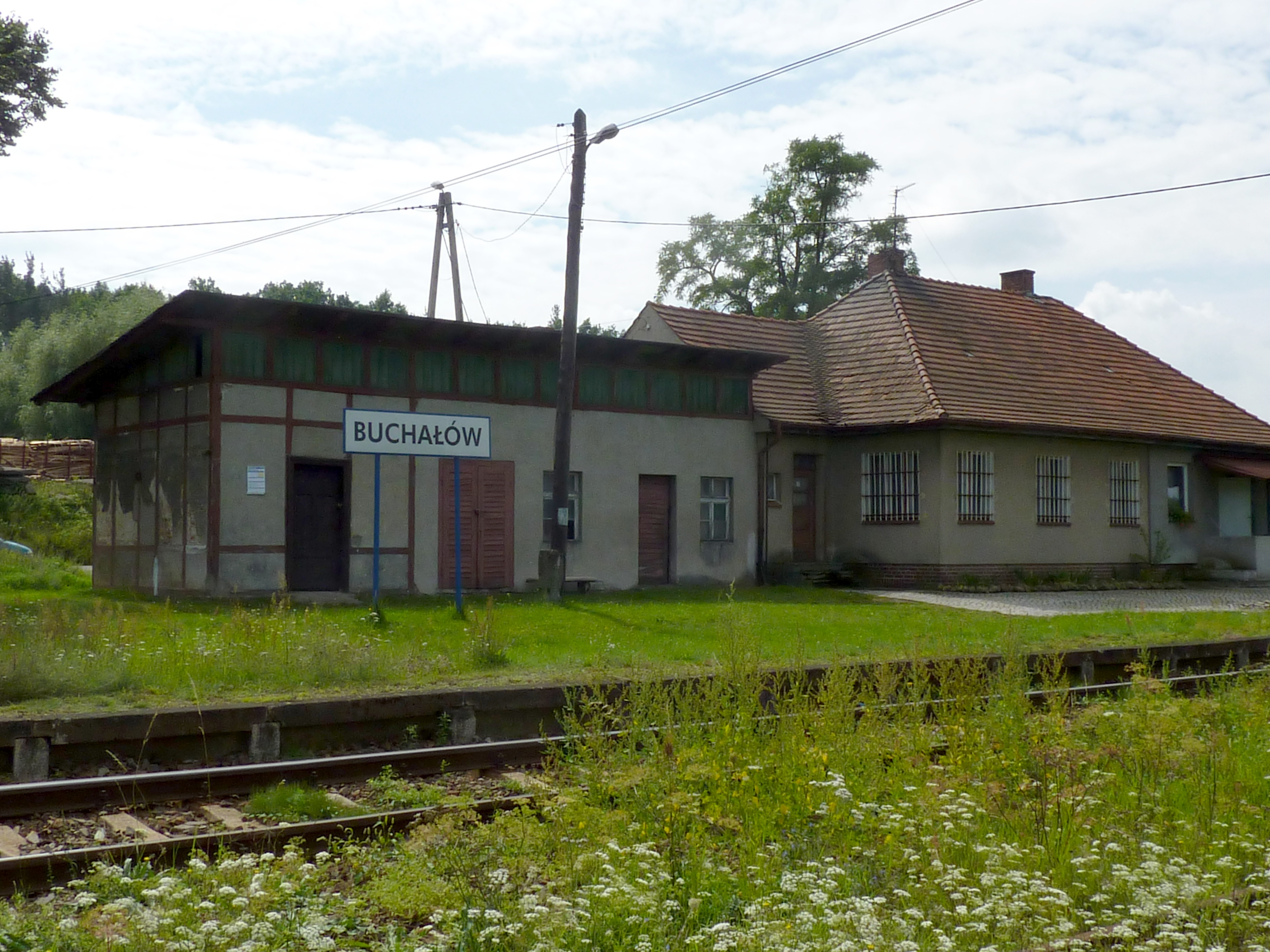
Buchałów prior to its modernisation

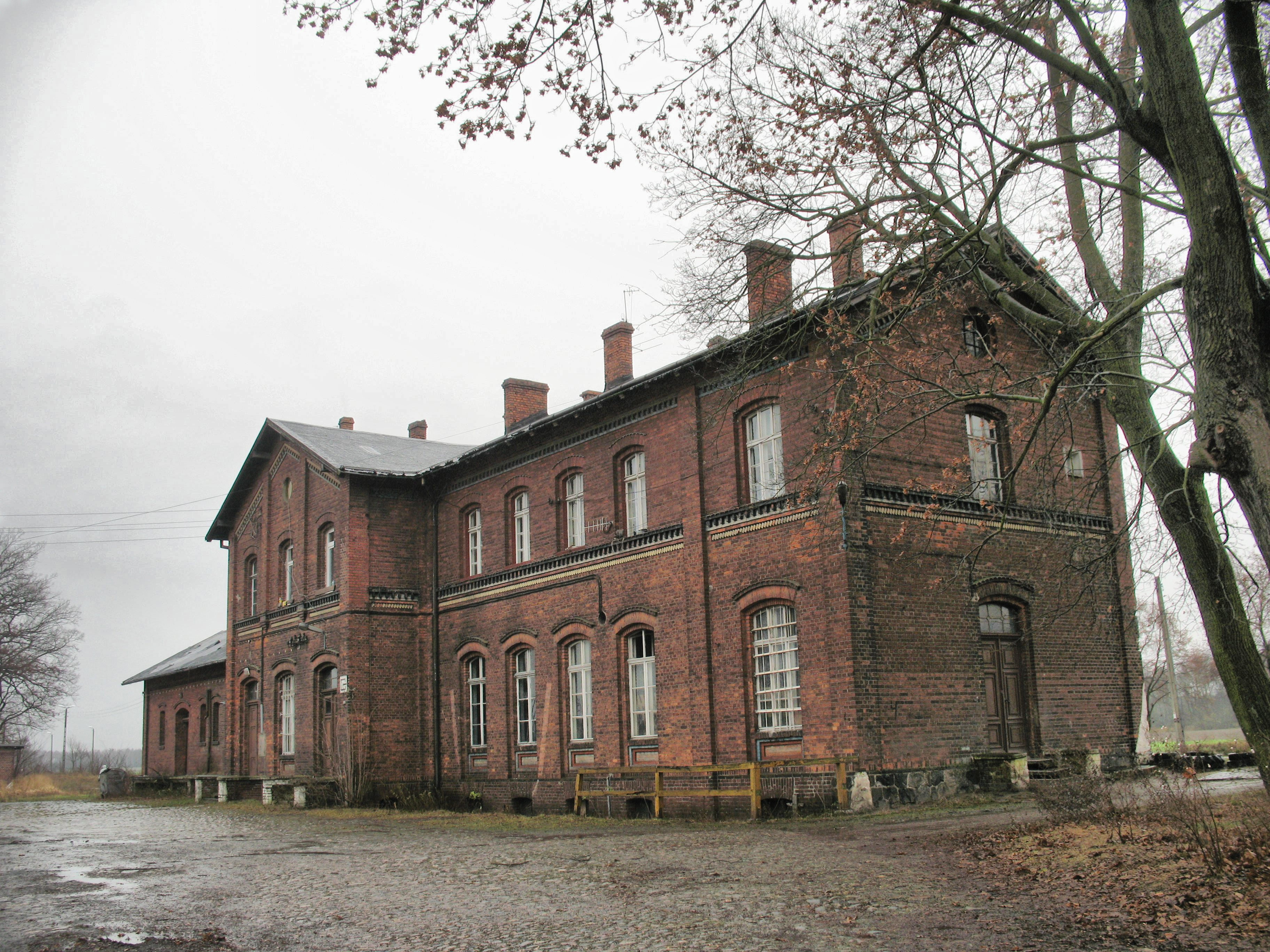
Bieniów railway station

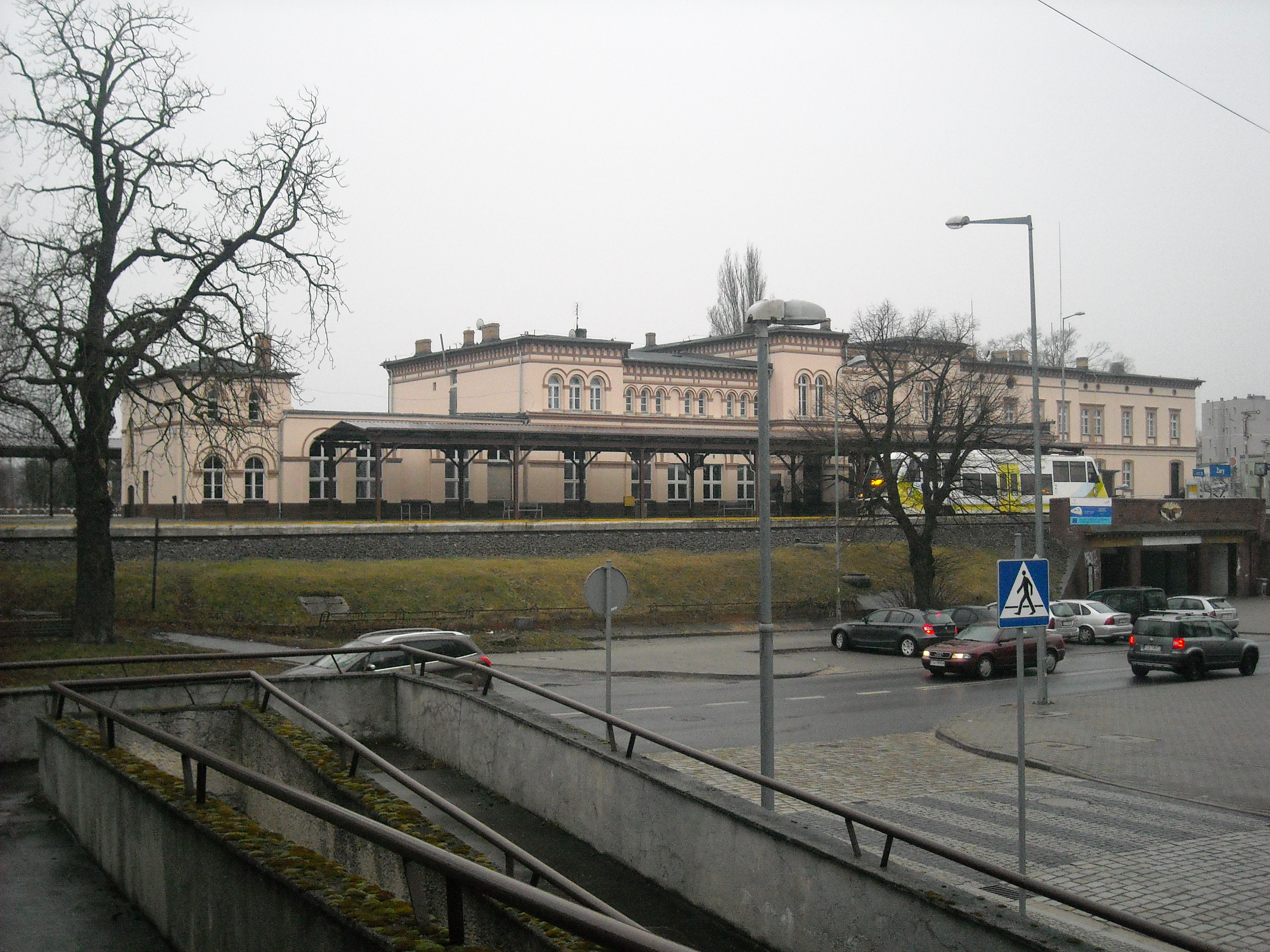
Żary railway station
