= Polregio =

Train operator in Poland

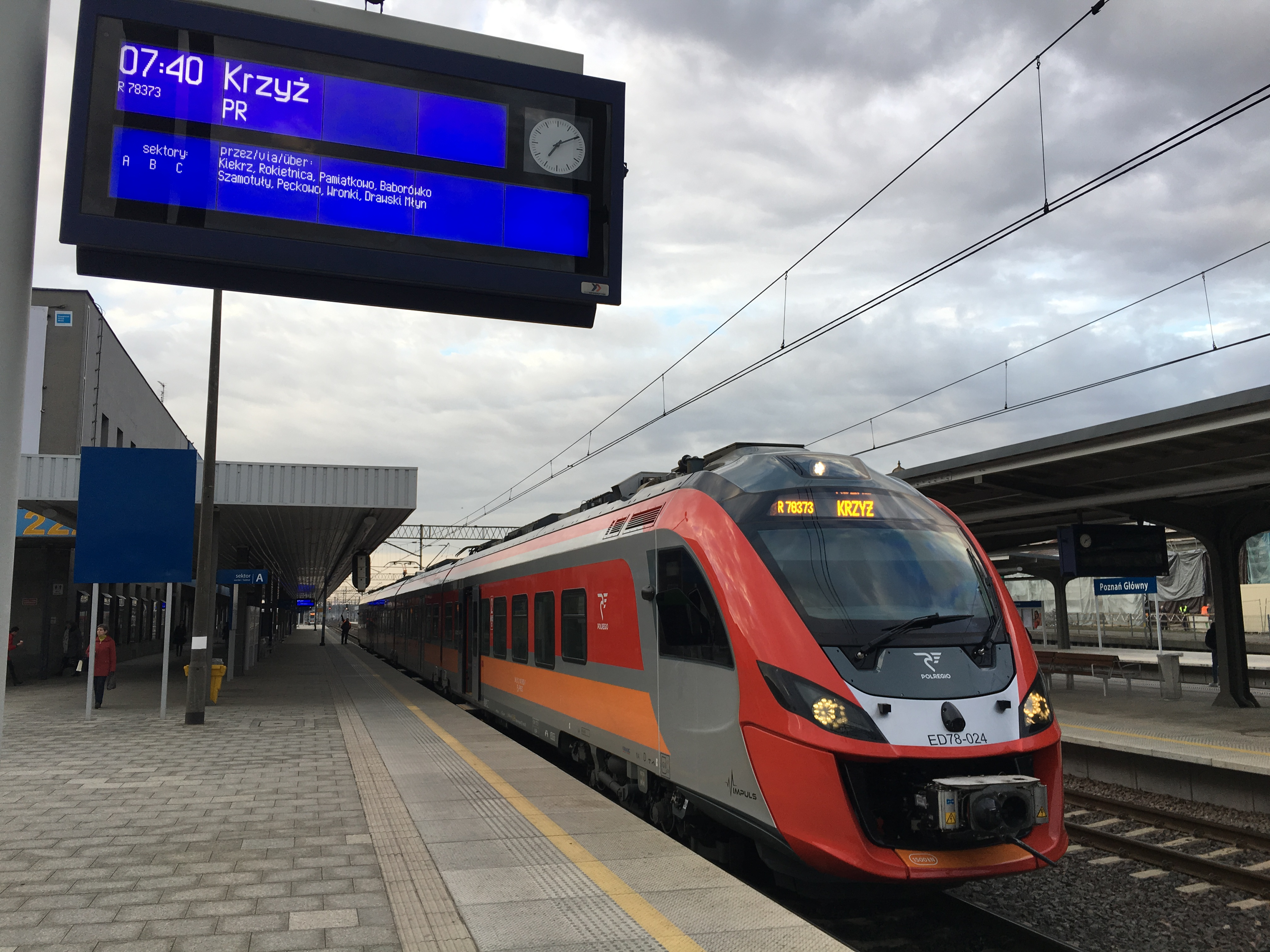
- ED78-024 Newag Impuls type at Poznań Główny station
- Type: Spółka akcyjna
- Industry: Rail transport
- Founded: 1 October 2001
- Headquarters: Warsaw, Poland
- Key people: Adam Pawlik, CEO; Marcin Mróz, Chairman of the supervisory board
- Number of employees: 6,637 (November 2022)
- Website: polregio.pl

Polregio (formerly Przewozy Regionalne, lit. 'Regional Transport') is a train operator in Poland, responsible for local and interregional passenger transportation. Each day it runs approximately 3,000 regional trains. In 2002 it carried 215 million passengers.

The company was founded in 2001 from the splitting of the PKP Passenger Transport Sector of the once-unitary Polish State Railways national rail operator into several companies to meet European Union requirements.

== Train categories ==
REGIO (R)
local passenger train, 2nd class only, stops (usually) at all stations
REGIOplus
semi-fast local passenger train, 2nd class only, stops at a limited number of stations, same fare as Regio
interREGIO (IR)
low-cost inter-regional fast train, 2nd class only, stops at medium and major stations only; since 1 September 2015 only on routes Łódź – Warszawa and Ełk – Grodno (Belarus), due to company's economics and restructuring.
REGIOekspres (RE)
fast trains on international routes; stop at major stations only; 1st and 2nd class, higher standard than IR; currently only on the routes: Dresden Hbf – Wrocław Główny and Frankfurt (Oder)-Poznań (both operated by DB Regio on the German part of the route as RegionalExpress)

From 26 May 2006 until 1 February 2014, Polregio also operated an airport rail link service (the first in whole of Poland) called Balice Express, connecting Kraków Airport (via Kraków Lotnisko railway station) with Kraków Główny at its own fare. The service ceased when the railway line was upgraded and electrified and then taken over by Lesser Poland Railways for its SKA1 line.

For domestic routes IR and RE trains share the same fare for the 2nd class (meaning you can board an RE train with an IR ticket and vice versa). With the exception of the two above-mentioned RegioExpress trains, there is no reservation in any of the Polregio trains.

Until 1 December 2008 the company also used to run other 300 interregional and international fast trains (pociąg pospieszny), but per the government's decision, the interregional and international fast trains were transferred to its then-sister company, PKP Intercity and rebranded to Tanie Linie Kolejow (lit. 'Cheap Railway Lines').

== Ownership ==
Until 22 December 2008 Polregio was a wholly owned subsidiary of the PKP Group, after that date all of its shares have been transferred to the 16 voivodeship governments. Thus, the company is no longer part of the PKP Group and on interregional routes its InterRegio trains compete with PKP Intercity TLK trains.

On 8 December 2009, the company changed its name from PKP Przewozy Regionalne to Przewozy Regionalne, and in January 2017, the company started using the brand name POLREGIO for its services.

Voivodship	Number of shares	Percentage of shares	Location of directorate
Greater Poland	123,243	9.7%	Poznań
Kuyavia-Pomerania	73,691	5.8%	Bydgoszcz
Lesser Poland	81,315	6.4%	Kraków
Łódź	72,421	5.7%	Łódź
Lower Silesia	92,750	7.3%	Wrocław
Lublin	69,880	5.5%	Lublin
Lubusz	55,462	3.6%	Zielona Góra
Masovia	171,523	13.5%	Warsaw
Opole	43,198	3.4%	Opole
Podlaskie	48,281	3.8%	Białystok
Pomerania	90,208	7.1%	Gdynia
Silesia	116,890	9.2%	Katowice
Subcarpathia	62,257	4.9%	Rzeszów
Świętokrzyskie	38,116	3.0%	Kielce
Warmia-Masuria	67,339	5.3%	Olsztyn
West Pomerania	73,691	5.8%	Szczecin

== Branches ==
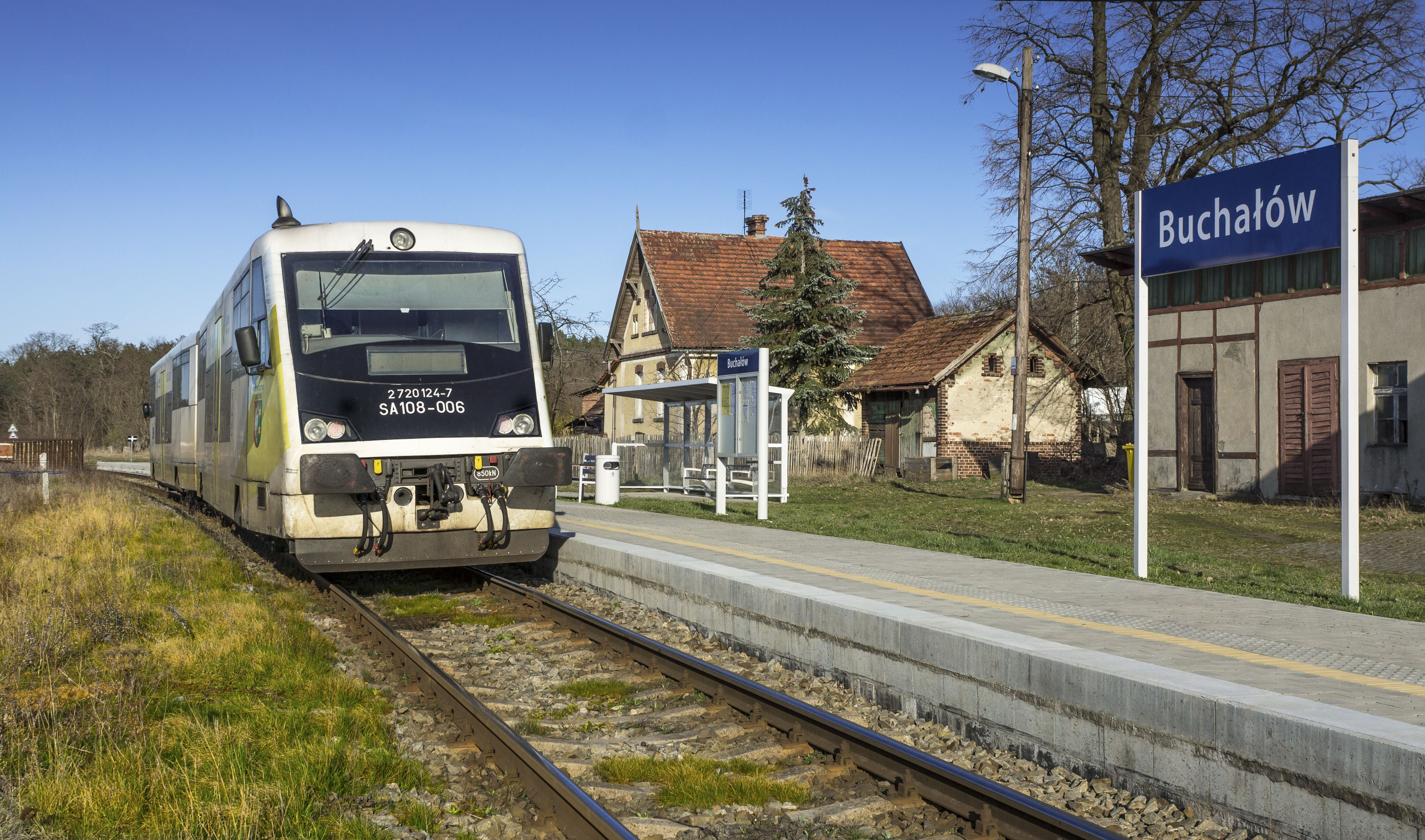
SA108 of Lubusz at Buchałow on the Zielona Góra–Żary railway in April 2021

=== Lubusz ===
The Lubusz Voivodeship owns 55,462 shares of Polregio, representing 3.6% of the company's share capital. It forms the Lubusz branch of Polregio, which is based in Zielona Góra. The branch most consists of diesel stock, such as the Pesa 218M. It serves eight routes across the Lubusz Voivodeship, some extending outside into neighbouring voivodeships. Since 2025, there have been plans for the branch to be replaced by the Lubusz Voivodeship's own rail operator; however efforts on its establishment are still ongoing.

== Rolling stock ==
=== Electric multiple units ===
Family	Class	Image	Cars	Type	Top speed		Number	Builder	Refurbished by
Family	Class	Image	Cars	Type	km/h	mph	Number	Builder	Refurbished by
–	EN57		3	EMU	110–120	68–75	295	Pafawag	Pesa Mińsk Mazowiecki, Newag, HCP FPS
–	EN71		4	EMU	110	69	4	Pafawag	–
–	ED72		4	EMU	110–120	68–75	20	Pafawag	Pesa Mińsk Mazowiecki
–	EN81		1	EMU	120	75	6	Pesa	–
Newag Impuls	14WE		3	EMU	110	69	5	Newag	–
Newag Impuls	EN63		3	EMU	160	100	59	Newag	–
Newag Impuls	ED78		4	EMU	160	100	30	Newag	–
Newag Impuls	EN78		4	EMU	160	100	5	Newag	–
Newag Impuls	EN90		5	EMU	160	100	10	Newag	–
Newag Impuls	EN98		2	EMU	160	100	12	Newag	–
Newag Impuls	31WEbb		4	EMU	160	100	29	Newag	–
Newag Impuls	36WEhb		4	EMU			8	Newag	–
Pesa Elf	EN62		3	EMU	160	100	6	Pesa	–
Pesa Elf	EN76		4	EMU	160	100	8	Pesa	–
Pesa Elf	EN96		2	EMU	160	100	8	Pesa	–
Pesa Elf	22WEg		4	EMU	160	100	5	Pesa	–
Pesa Acatus Plus	EN64		3	EMU	160	100	5	Pesa	–
Pesa Acatus Plus	EN99		2	EMU	160	100	8	Pesa	–

=== Electric locomotives ===
(as at 15 June 2020)

Type	Number	Speed	Manufacturer	Modernized
EP07P	5	125 km/h	Pafawag	ZNLE Gliwice
Together: 5

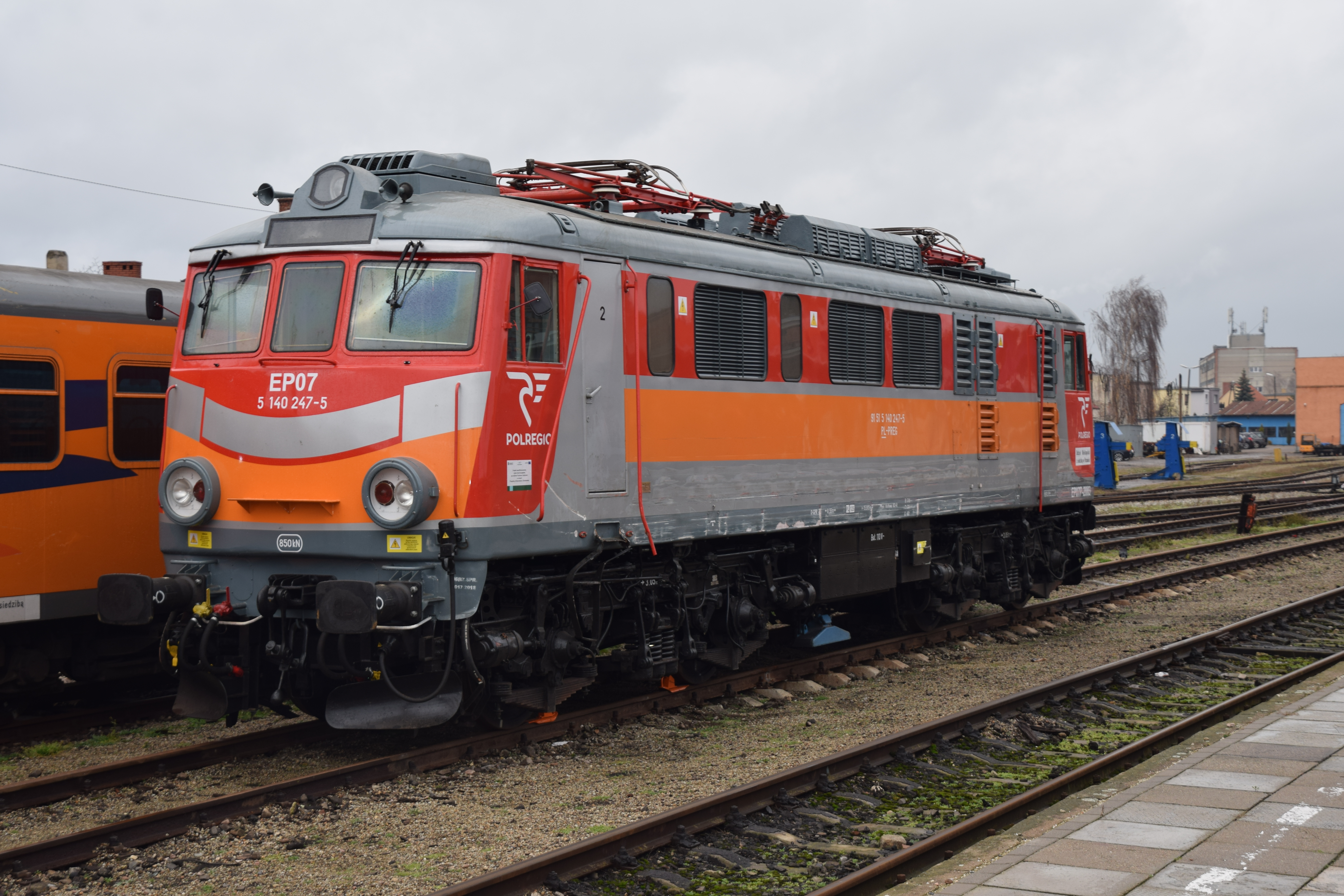
EP07P-2003

=== Diesel locomotives ===
(as at 15 June 2020)

Type	Number	Speed	Manufacturer	Modernized
SM42	11	90 km/h	Fablok	
SU42	7	90 km/h	Fablok	ZNTK Nowy Sącz
SM04	5	30 km/h	Zastal	
Together: 23

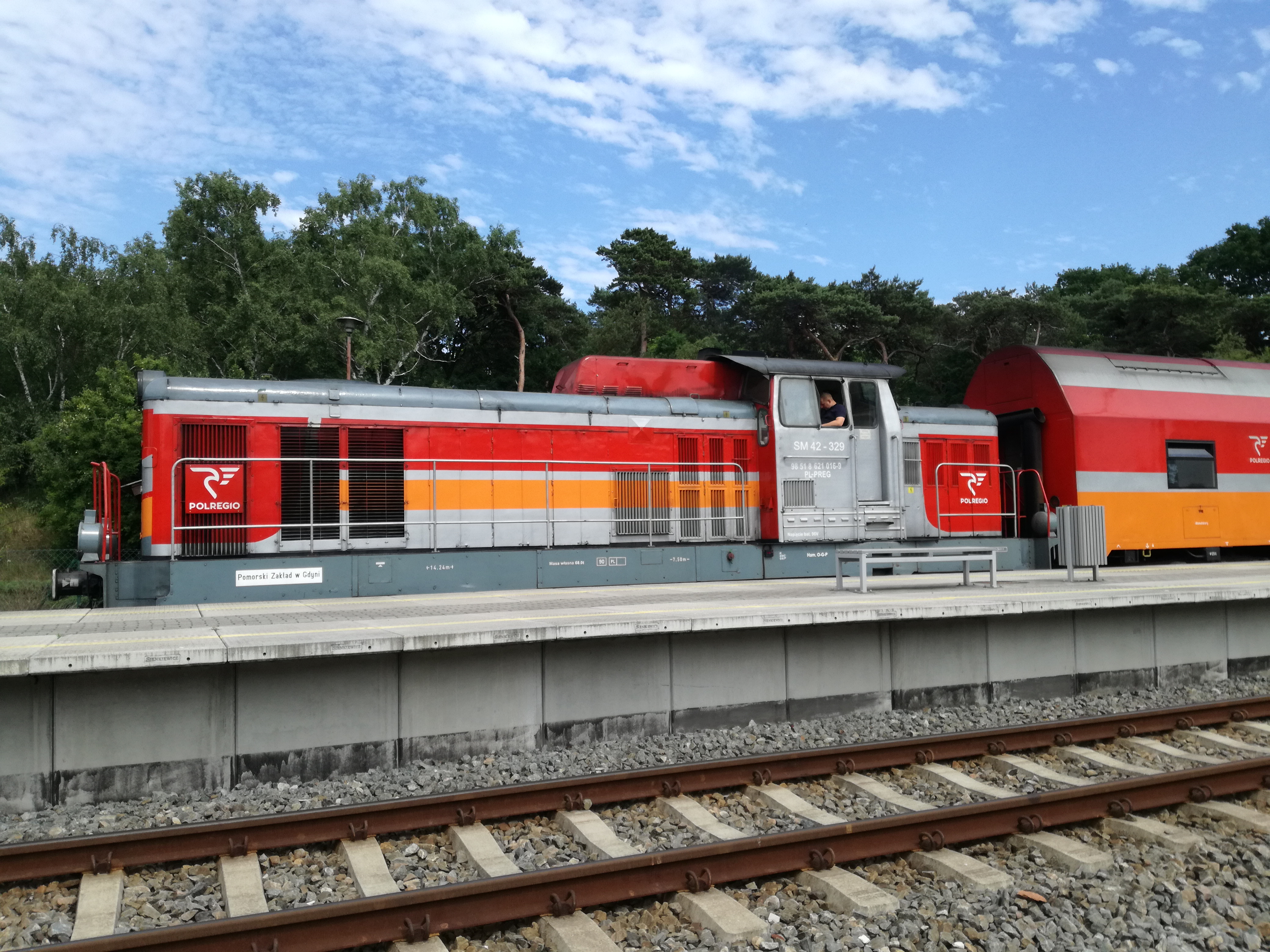
SM42-3229

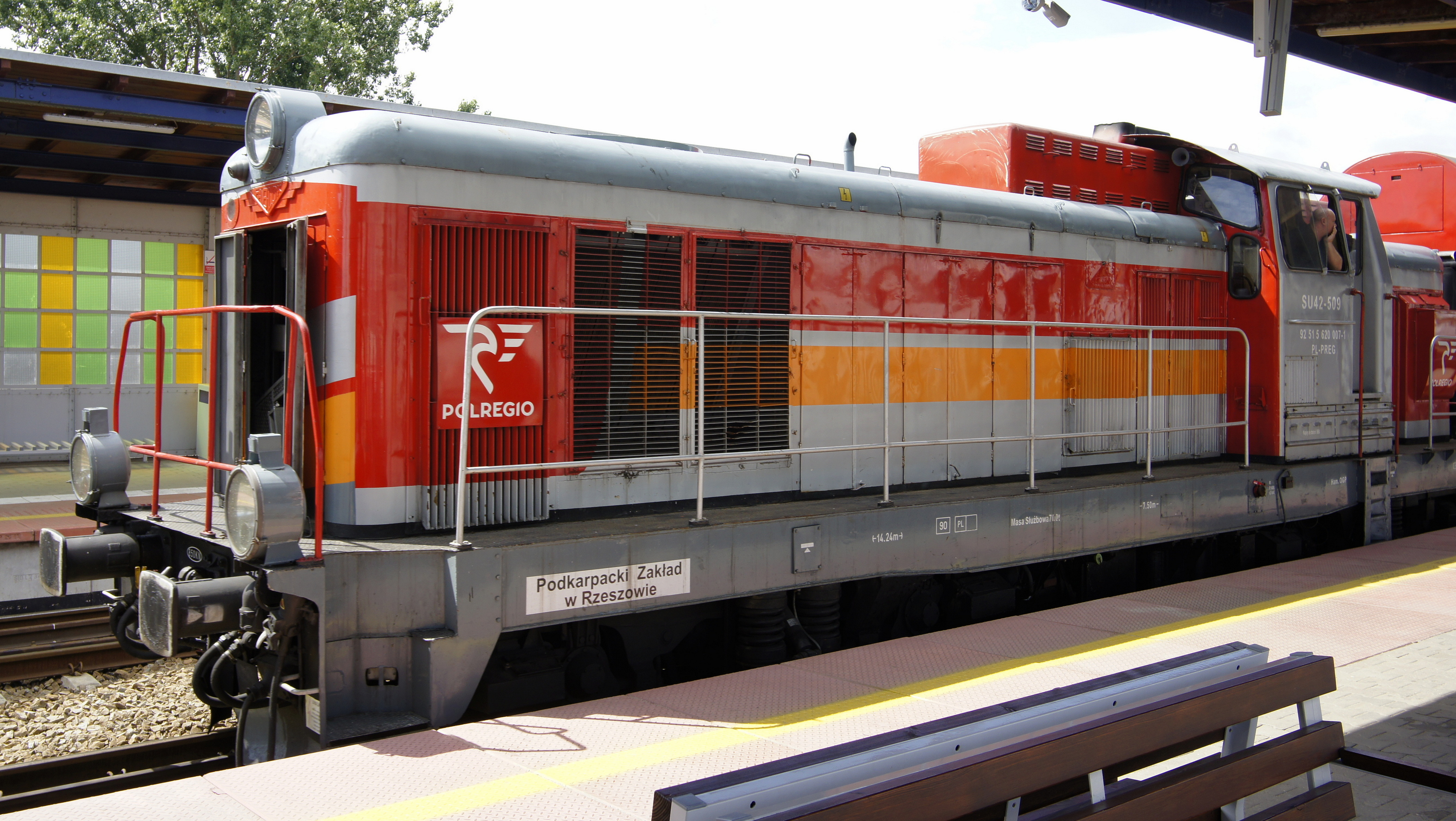
SU42

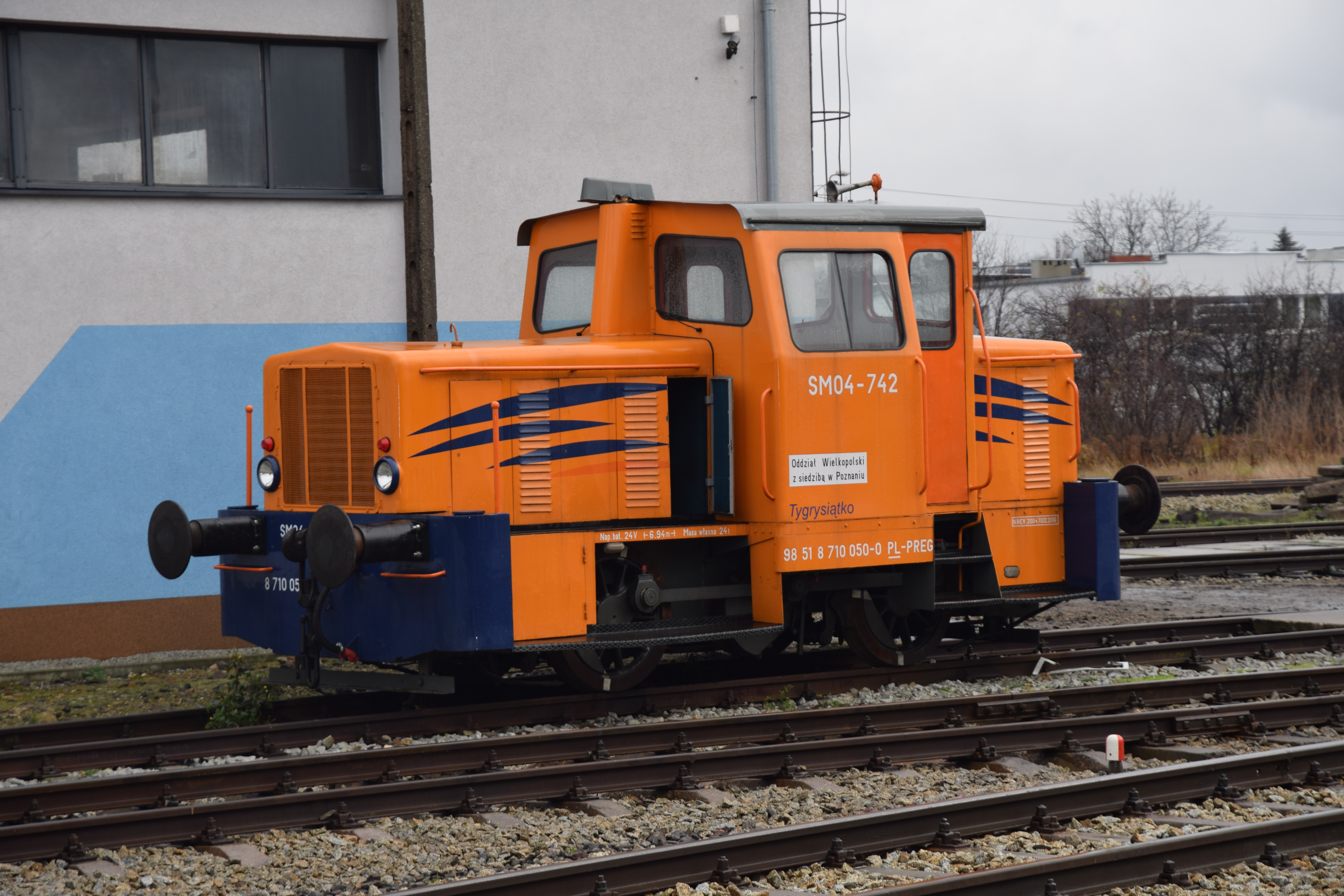
SM04-742

=== Carriages ===
(as at 15 June 2020)

Type	Number	Speed	Manufacturer	Modernized
120A	9	120 km/h	Pafawag	
Bmnopux	18	120 km/h	Waggonbau Görlitz	Pesa
161A	5	160 km/h	HCP	Pesa
162A	6	160 km/h	HCP	Pesa
163A	5	160 km/h	HCP	Pesa
113Aa	2	160 km/h	HCP	Pesa
Together: 45

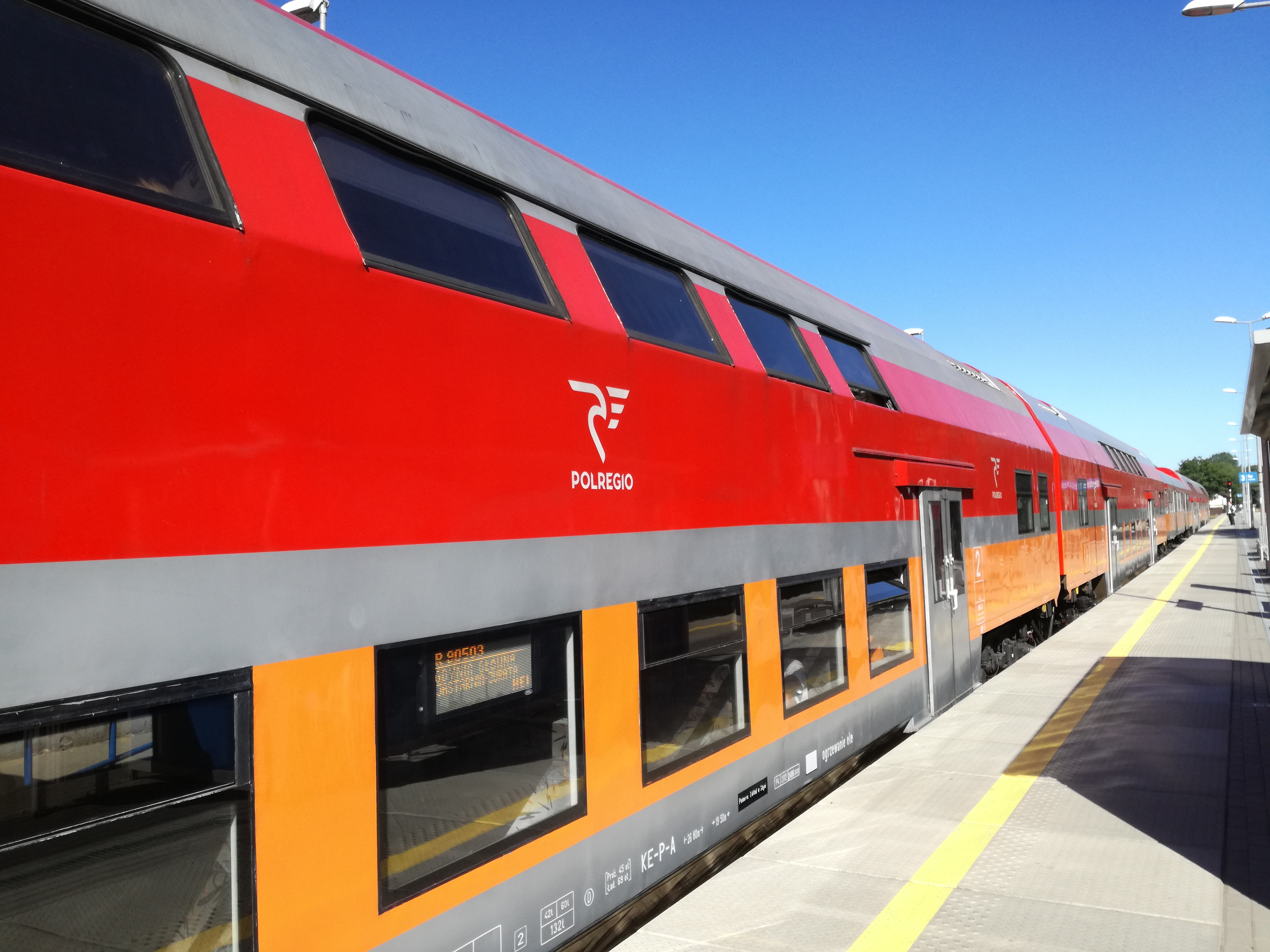
Bmnopux

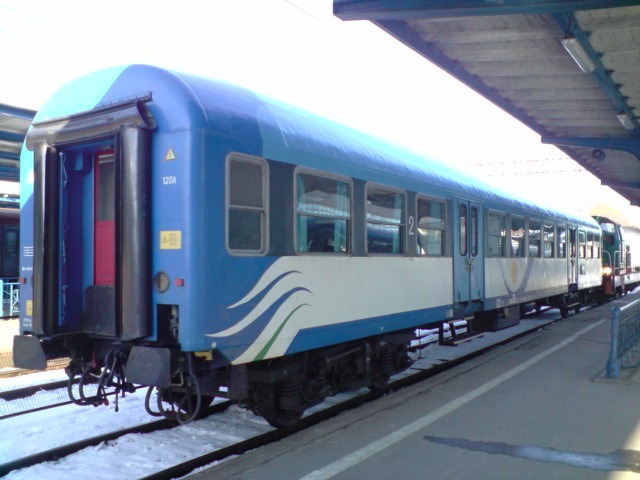
120A

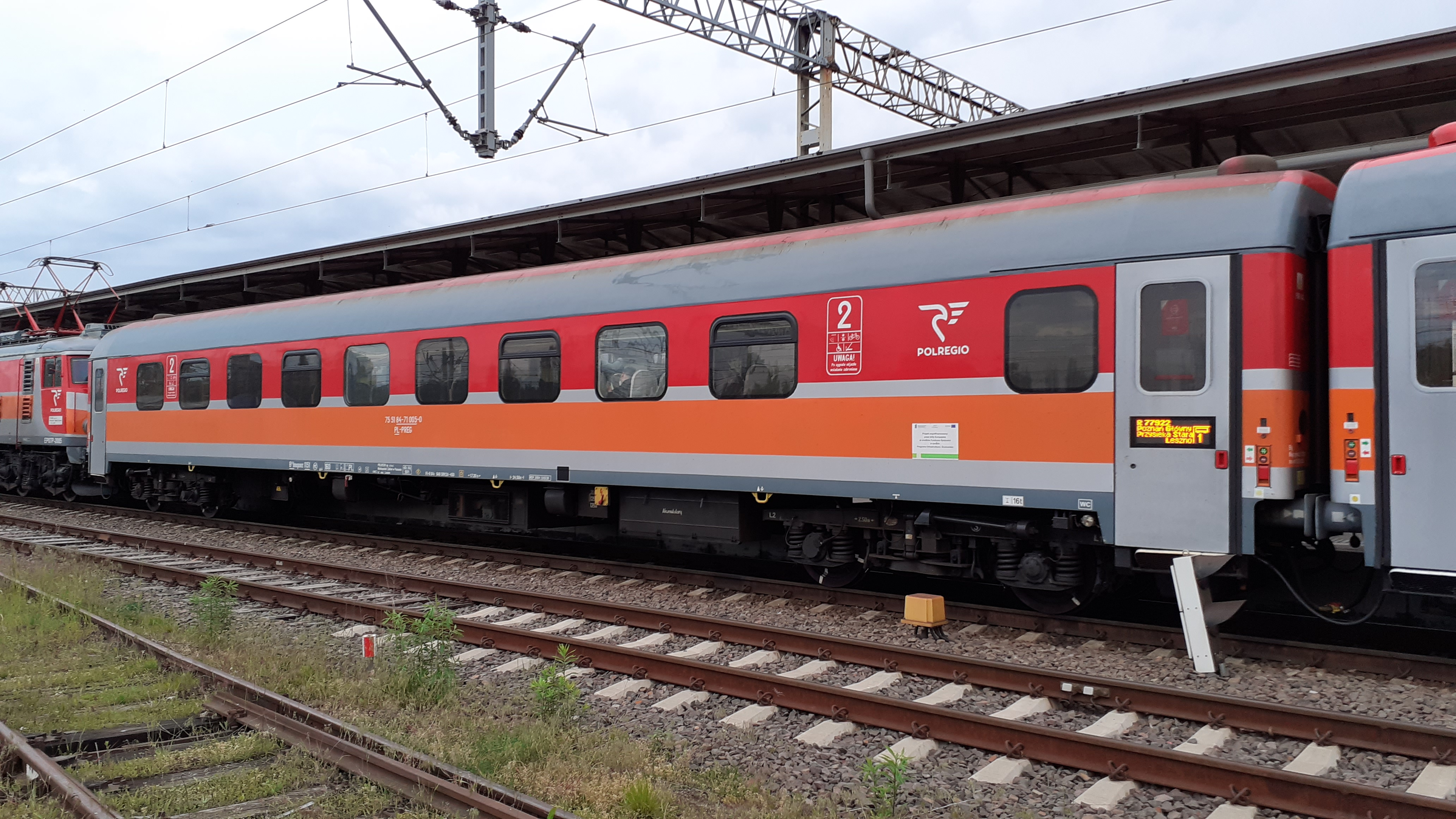
161A

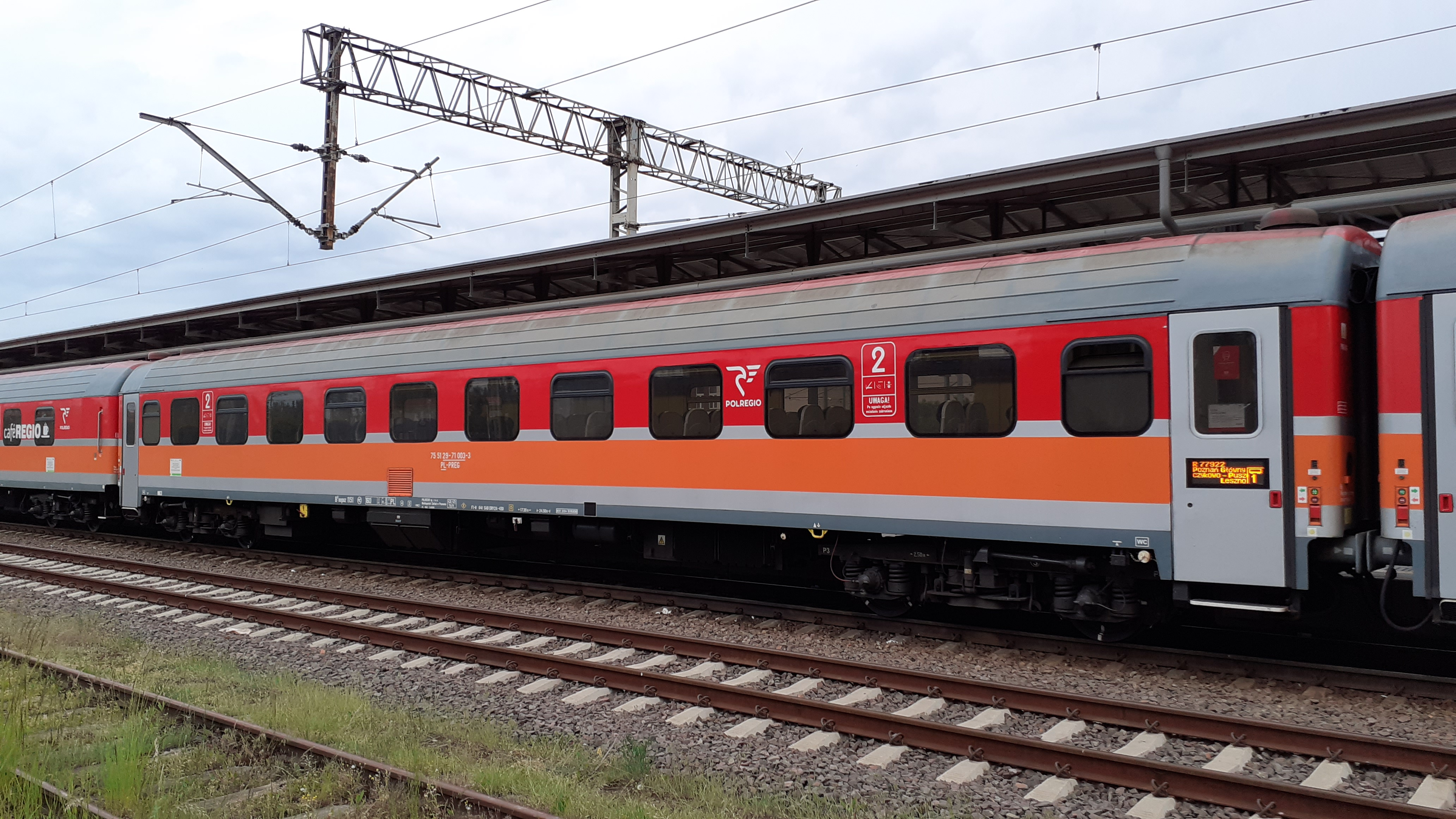
162A

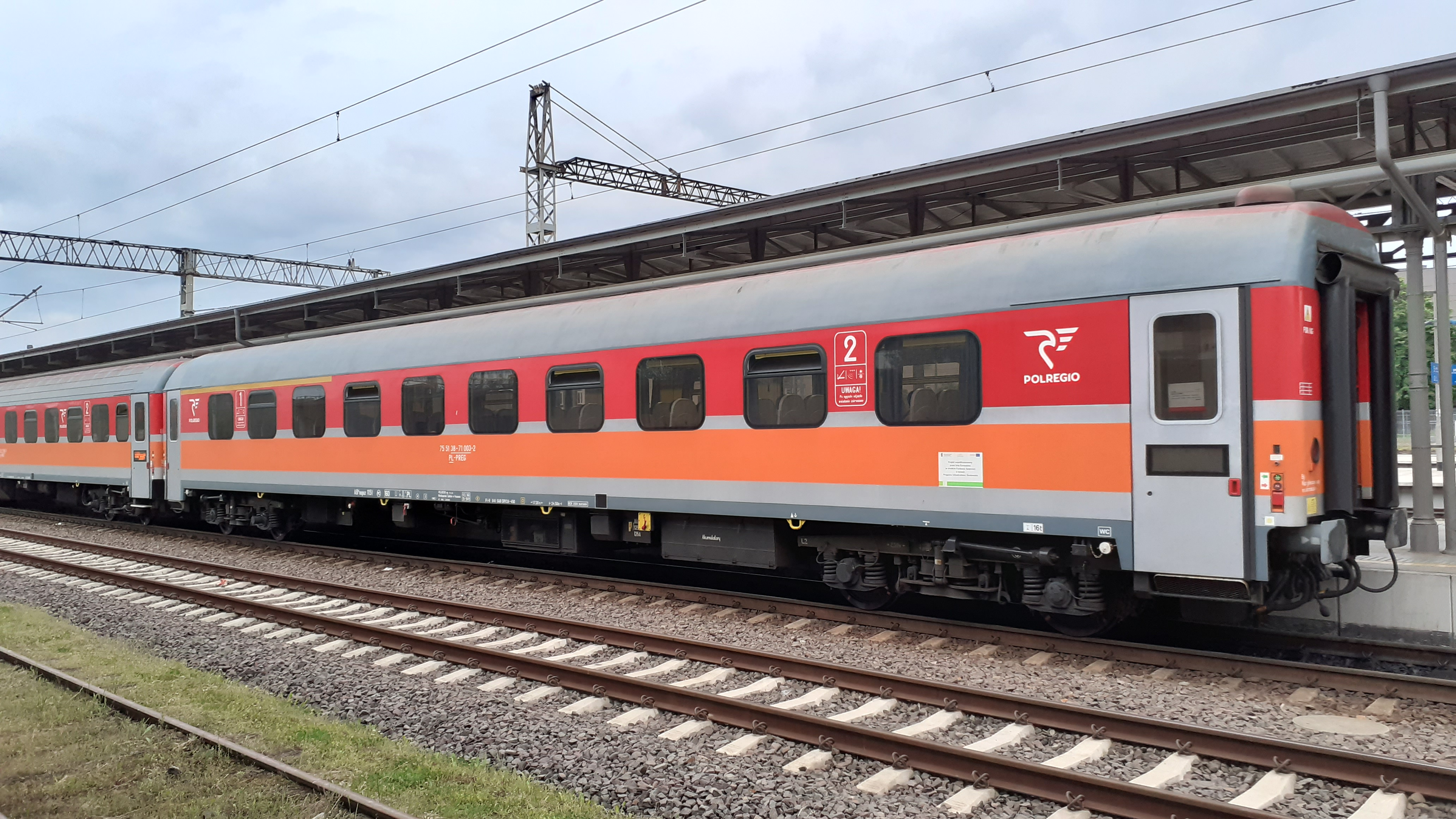
163A

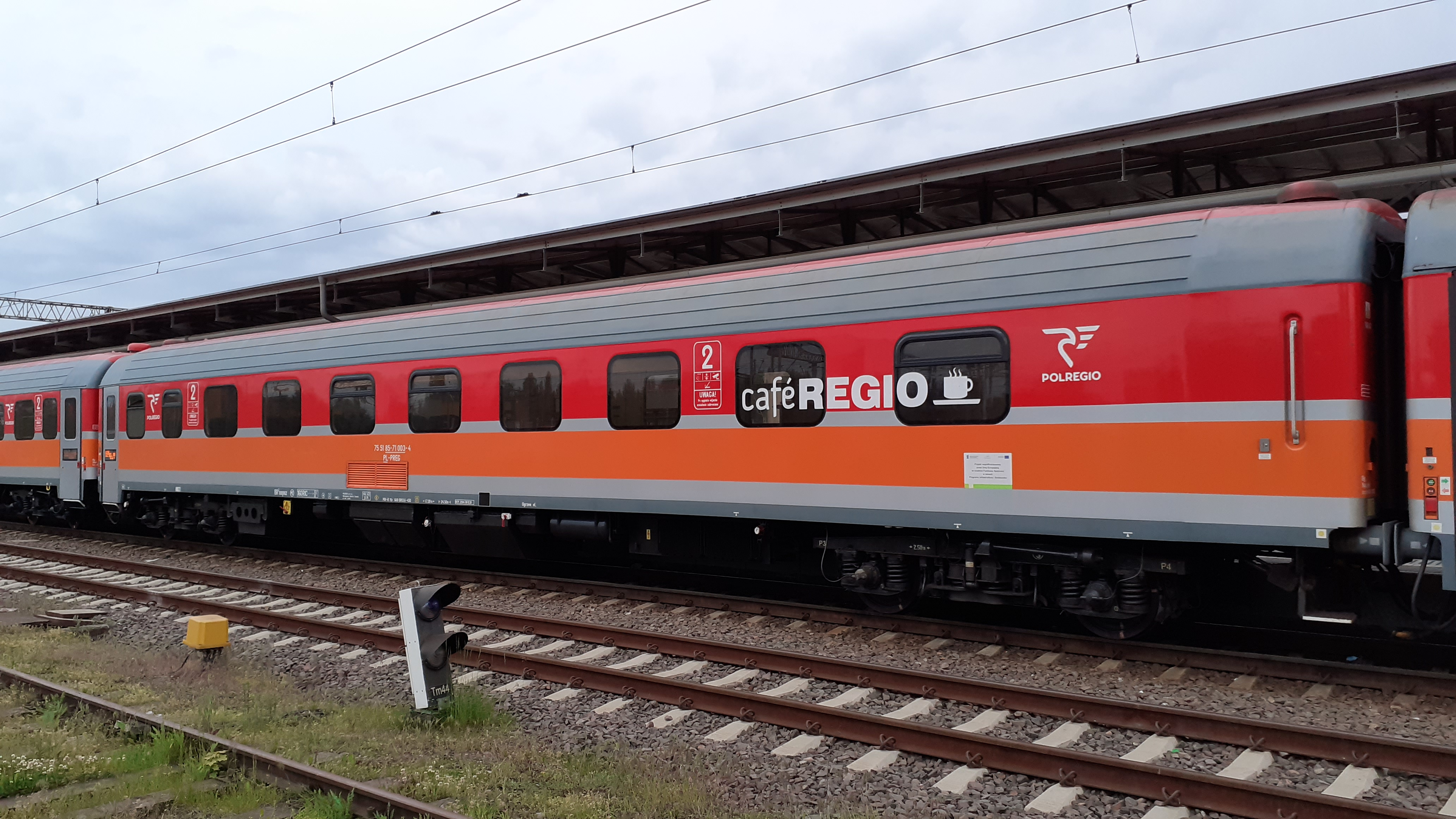
113Aa

=== Diesel multiple units ===
(as at 15 June 2020)

Type	Number	Speed	Manufacturer
SA103	13	120 km/h	Pesa
SA105	6	100 km/h	ZNTK Poznań
SA106	5	120 km/h	Pesa
SA107	2	100 km/h	Kolzam
SA108	6	100 km/h	ZNTK Poznań
SA109	7	100 km/h	Kolzam
SA131	1	120 km/h	Pesa
SA132	3	120 km/h	Pesa
SA133	24	120 km/h	Pesa
SA134	17	120 km/h	Pesa, ZNTK MM
SA135	8	120 km/h	Pesa, ZNTK MM
SA136	12	120 km/h	Pesa
SA137	7	120 km/h	Newag
SA138	3	120 km/h	Newag
SA139	11	120 km/h	Pesa
SA140	2	130 km/h	Newag
Together: 139

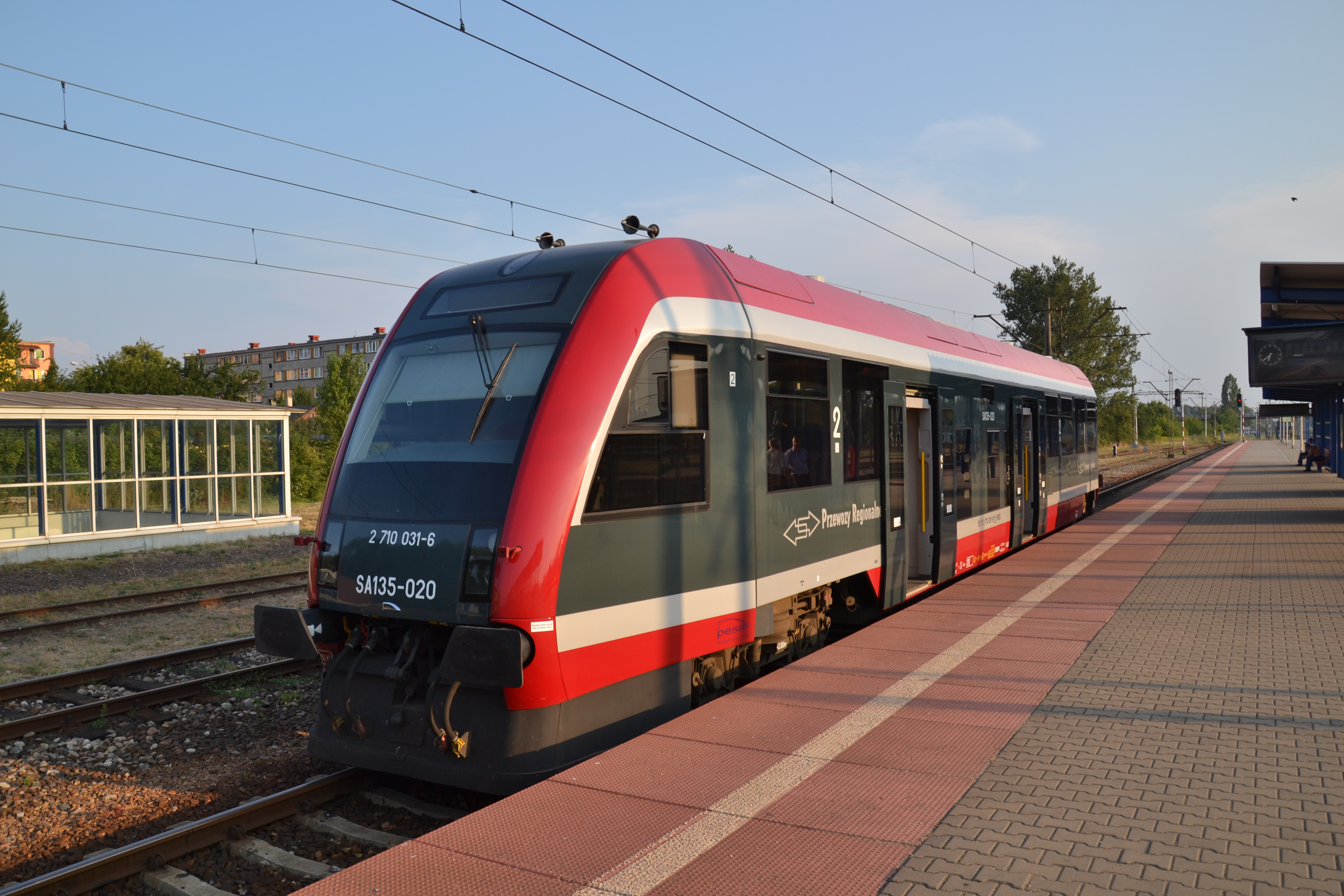
SA135-020 in Koluszki

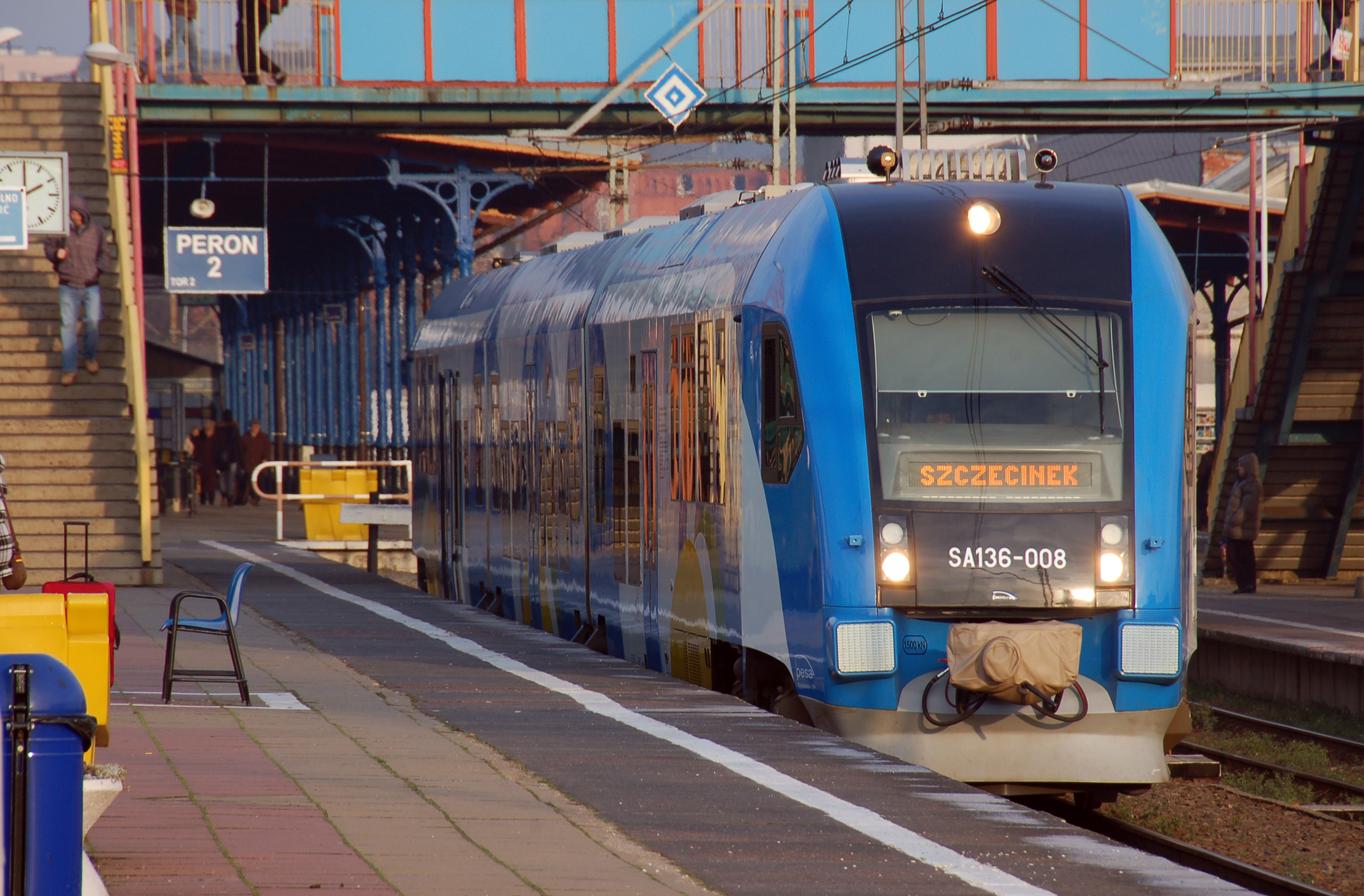
SA136-008

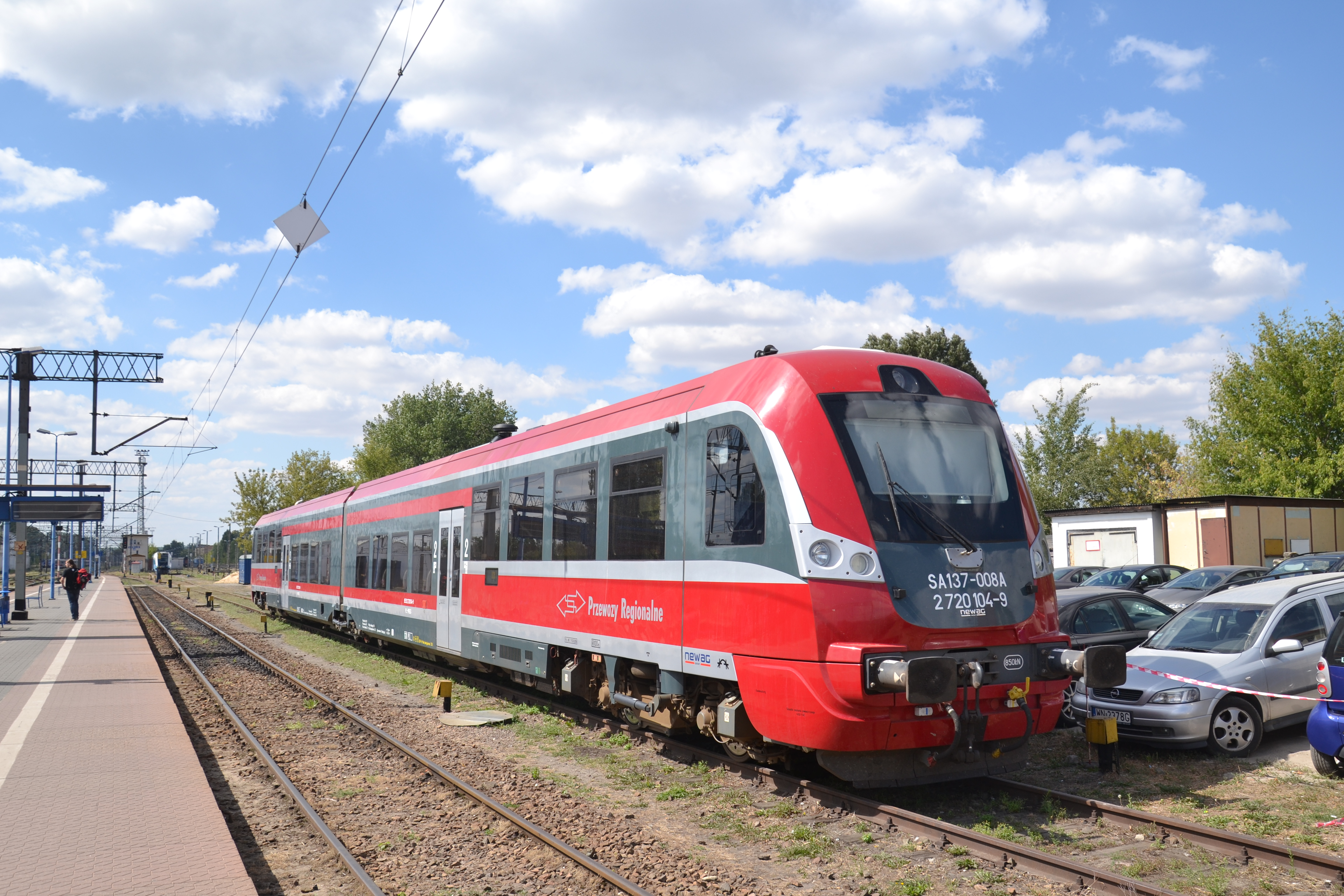
SA137-008

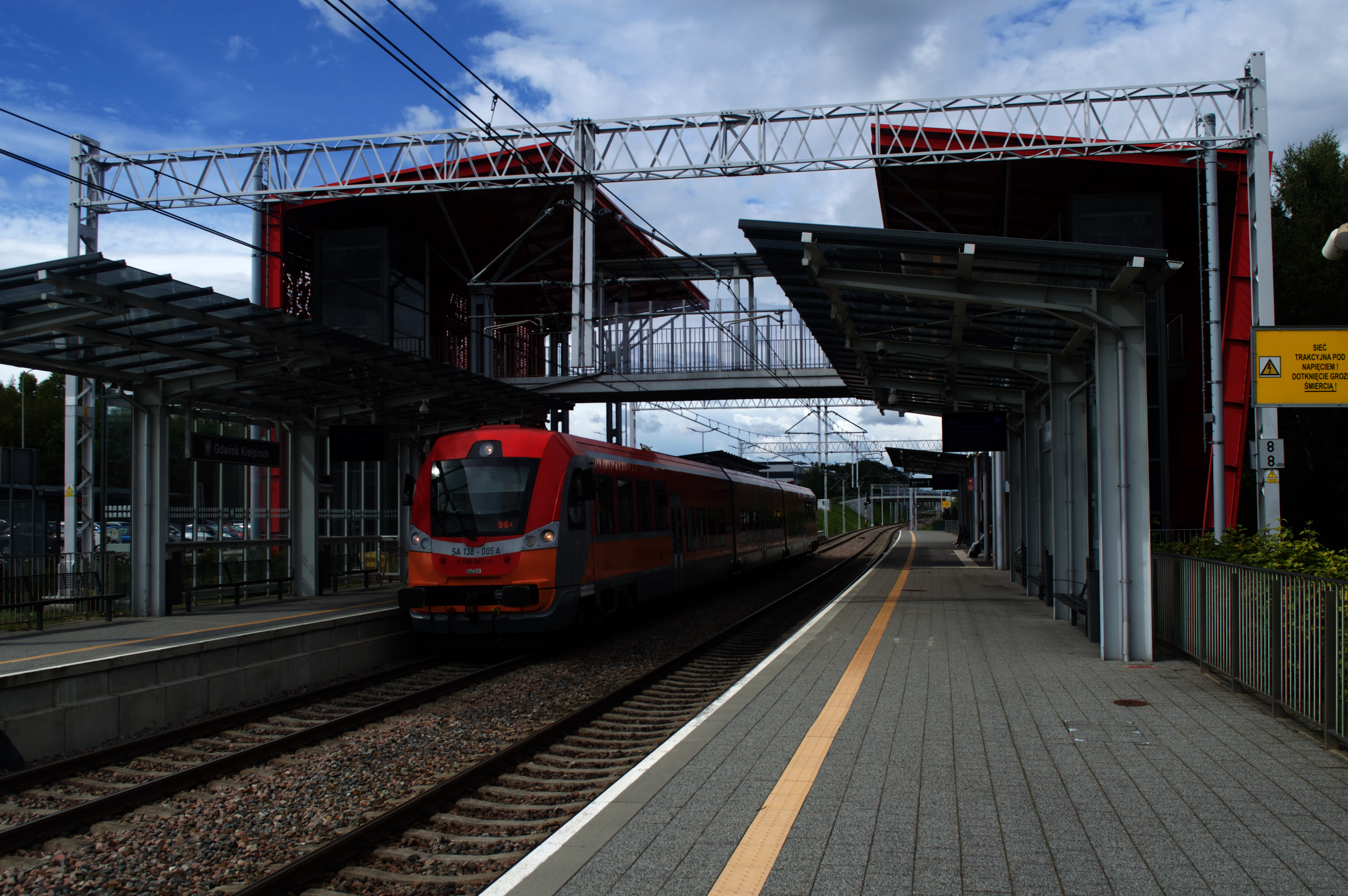
SA138-005

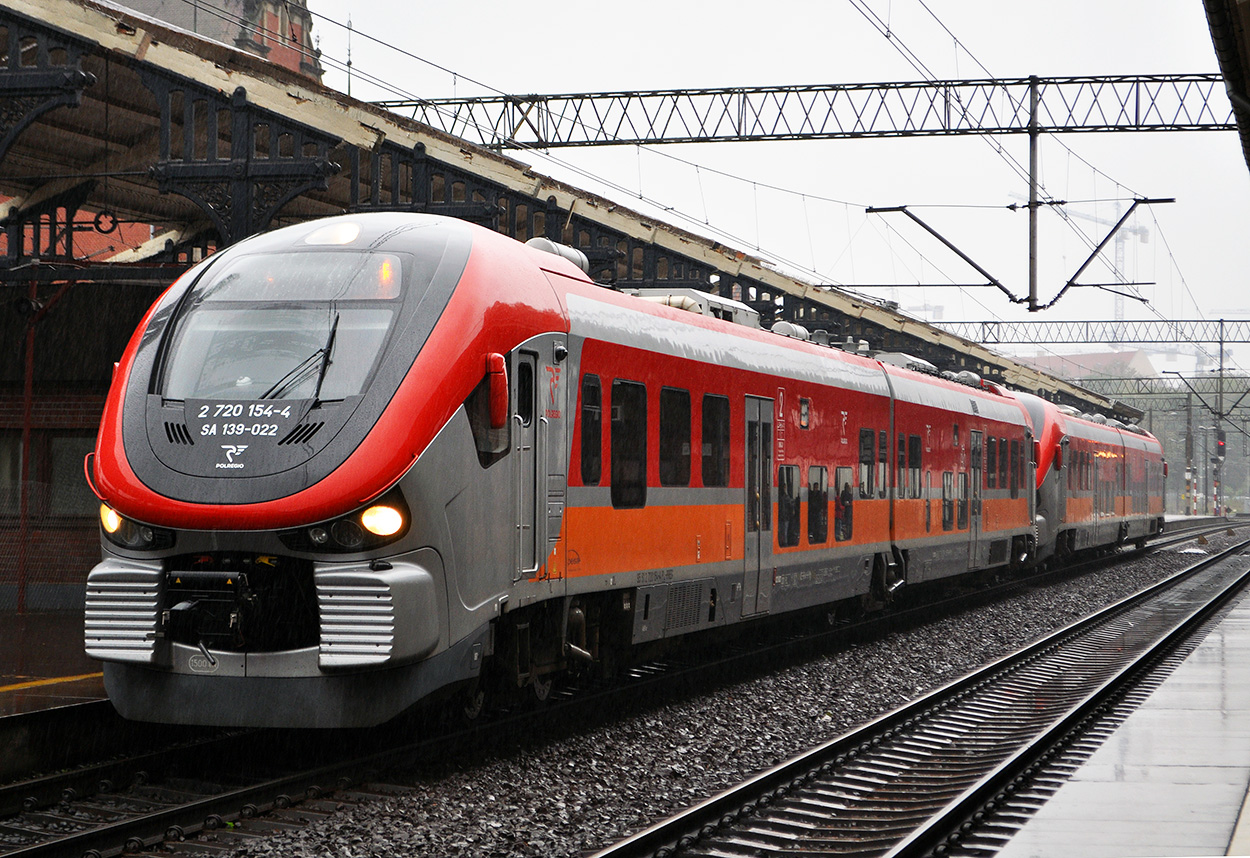
SA139-022 023

== Accidents and incidents ==
- On 3 March 2012, at approximately 20:55 CET, a Przewozy Regionalne train collided head-on with a PKP Intercity train on the Kozłów–Koniecpol railway near Szczekociny. Sixteen people died in the incident and 58 were injured. The cause of the incident was human error.
- On 5 October 2023, at around 7:00 CET, two Polregio trains collided head-on near Gdynia Główna, causing the first car of one train to derail and roll over to its side. Four people were injured, all of whom were railway workers.

== See also ==
- Rail transport in Poland
