= 2026 Białośliwie train collision =

Collision of two trains in western Poland

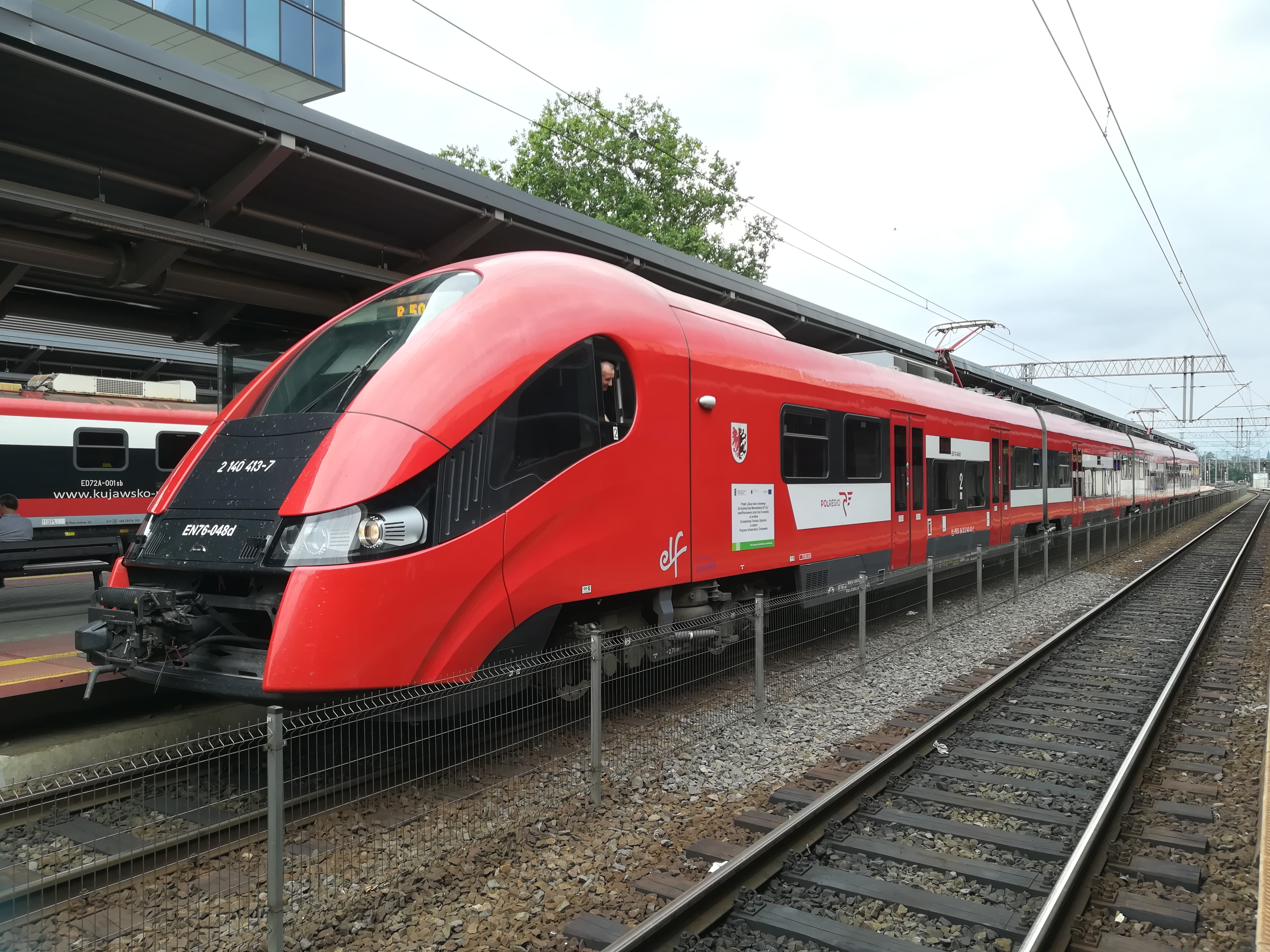
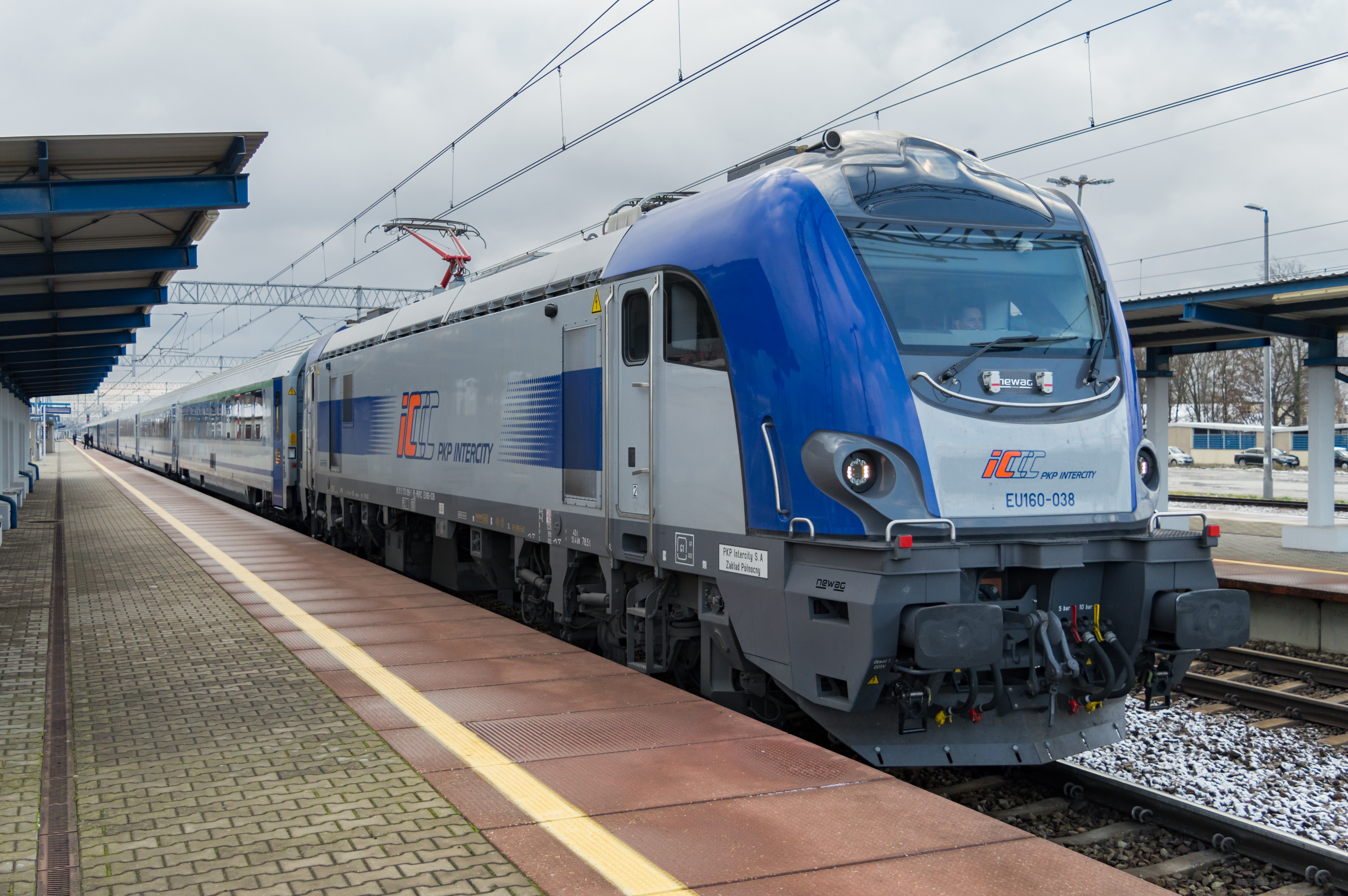
- A Polregio Pesa Elf EN76KP, the type of train involved A PKP Intercity Newag Griffin EU160, the type of train involved
- Approximate location of the collision

Details
- Date: 25 June 2026; 18:04 CET
- Location: Białośliwie, Piła County
- Country: Poland
- Line: Kutno–Piła railway
- Incident type: Rear-end collision
- Cause: Under investigation

Statistics
- Trains: 2
- Vehicles: Pesa Elf EN76KP (052); Newag Griffin EU160 (070)
- Deaths: 0
- Injured: 11

On 25 June 2026 at 18:04 CET, two passenger trains collided near Białośliwie railway station on the Kutno–Piła railway in Białośliwie, Piła County in western Poland. A Polregio train collided into a PKP Intercity train. A total of around 200 passengers were evacuated, eleven of whom suffered minor injuries.

== Collision ==
On 25 June 2026, at 18:04 CET, near Białośliwie railway station, a Polregio service, operating from Piła Główna to Bydgoszcz Główna collided rear-end into the rear carriages of a PKP Intercity service, "Staszic" operating from Białogard to Warszawa Wschodnia. Upon impact, the Polregio train derailed, which also resulted in the three rear carriages of the PKP Intercity train to derail.

== Casualties and response ==
Eleven passengers of the PKP Intercity train suffered injuries, three of whom where hospitalised. None of the 20 passengers of the Polregio train were injured. Some 200 passengers were evacuated from both trains.

Two rescue trains, and a crane, were dispatched to rerail the derailed trains. Polskie Linie Kolejowe (PLK) dismantled the overhead wires to rerail the trains, and repaired all damaged tracks and rail infrastructure. Both trains were rerailed at midnight on 27 June, with one of the tracks reopening to traffic on the same day. Repair works on the other track and rail infrastructure are still underway by PLK.

== See also ==
- Sokolniki Suche train collision
