= Pesa Elf =

Polish family of electric multiple units

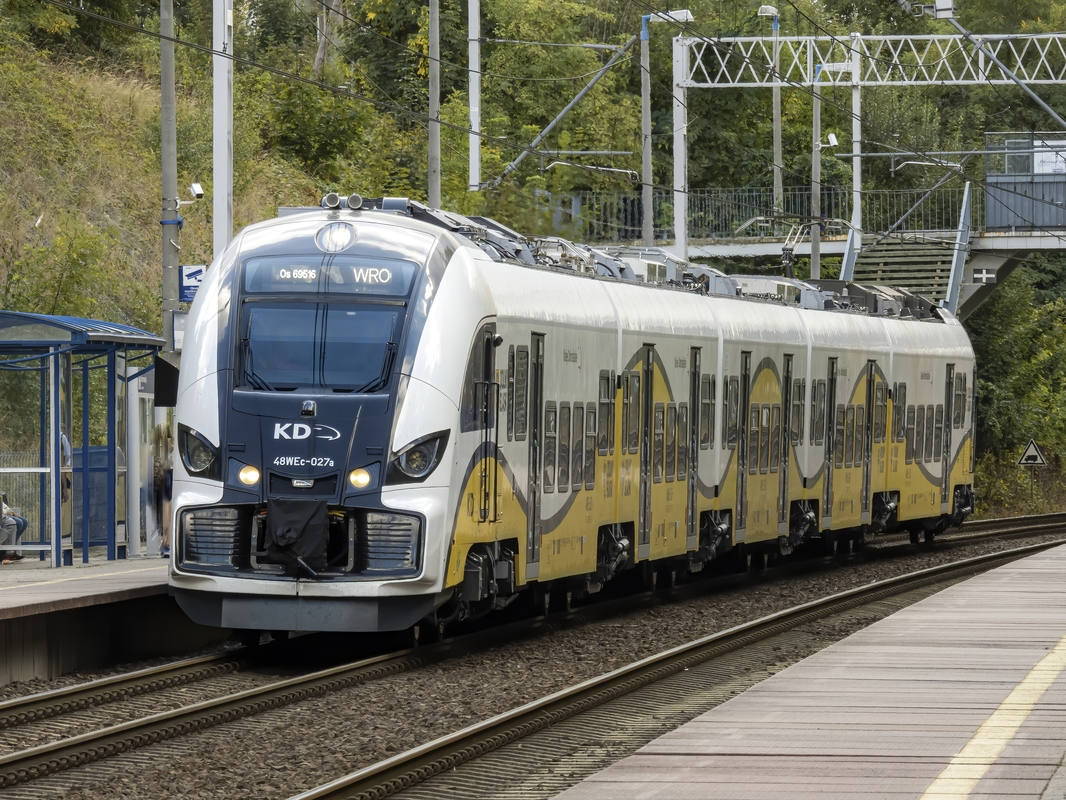
- Elf II 48WEc of Lower Silesian Railways at Zgorzelec Miasto in 2022

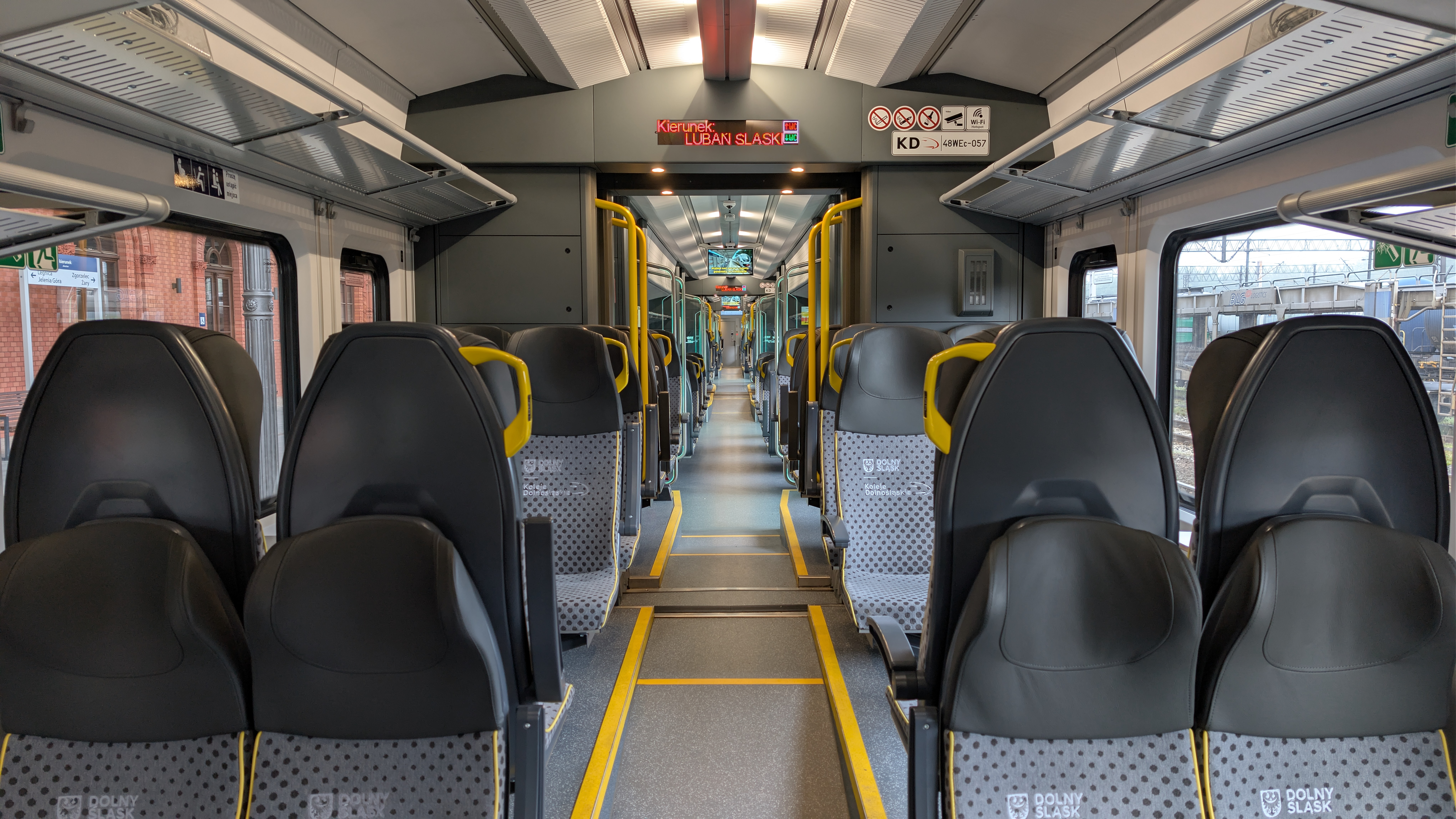
- Interior of Elf II 48WEc of Lower Silesian Railways at Węgliniec in 2026
- Stock type: Electric multiple unit
- Manufacturer: Pesa SA
- Assembly: Poland
- Family name: Elf
- Constructed: 2010–present
- Entered service: 2011
- Number under construction: 88
- Number built: 189
- Fleet numbers: EN76 (4 cars); EN62 (3 cars); EN96 (2 cars)
- Operator: See Operation

Specifications
- Width: 2,880 mm (9 ft 5 in) (UIC 505-1)
- Height: 4,280 mm (14 ft 1 in)
- Platform height: 550 mm (1 ft 10 in)
- Maximum speed: Design: 190 km/h (118 mph); Majority: 160 km/h (100 mph)
- Traction system: electric
- Traction motors: 4 × 400 kW; 4 × 500 kW; 6 × 500 kW; 8 × 400 kW
- Power output: 1600–3200 kW
- Acceleration: around 1 m/s^{2}
- Electric systems: 3 kV DC, 25 kV AC overhead (also 1.5 kV DC and 15 kV AC are offered)
- Current collection: Pantograph
- Coupling system: Scharfenberg
- Multiple working: Up to 3 units
- Track gauge: 1,435 mm (4 ft 8 1/2 in) standard gauge

Pesa Elf (an abbreviation of Electric Low Floor) is a family of electric multiple unit trains developed by Polish rolling-stock manufacturer Pesa SA. Elf feature a low floor design, intended for railway stations with platforms below 55 cm (22 in), improving accessibility and reducing boarding times. The trains are designed for regional, commuter, and long distance services, with different variants tailored to their intended use. There are three classes of Elf trains; Elf I, Elf II, Elf.eu and the Elf III—used as a trade name for diesel multiple units of Pesa (such as the Pesa Link) targeting markets outside of Poland.

Each class includes several variants configured for different operators and service patterns. For example, the Elf I 27WE units which operate on Rapid Urban Railway (Warsaw) feature a longitudinal seating layout to maximise standing capacity for commuter services.

As of 2026, around 189 Pesa Elf trains operate across Europe, with an additional 88 units currently under construction. Elf.eu trains, which use a multi-voltage system, are in service outside of Poland, currently in the Czech Republic (RegioJet) and in Romania (CFR Călători). (Note: Elf III trains are also operated by České dráhy (Czech Republic) and Ghana Railway Company (Ghana), although this designation is excluded since Elf III is the trade name of other trains manufactured by Pesa, such as the Pesa Link.)

== History ==
=== Elf I ===
Following a major restructuring in 1998, Pesa initially (from 2001) focused on the production of diesel railbuses and DMUs, but in 2004 it undertook the construction of the first EMUs for the Warsaw Commuter Railway: Pesa Mazovia. Despite plans to purchase 10 units for the operator, production was ultimately cancelled after the construction of 1 unit. Two more EMUs were designed and built: the Pesa Acatus in 2006 and Pesa Bydgostia also in 2006 until 2008. The production of both trains were cancelled after the first batch, due to the high-level (1 m (3.3 ft)) floor design which hindered the rapid alighting of passengers and passengers who used bicycles, strollers, or wheelchairs for their journey. As most railway stations in Poland had low-level platforms, the only exceptions at the time were usually railway stations in Warsaw and Gdańsk.

Pesa began its design of the Electric Low Floor (Elf), together with the Acatus II. Both classes were designed with low-level boarding, at a height between 760 mm (30 in) for the Acatus II, and 760–800 mm (30–31 in) for the Elf trains. The design process of the Elf trains involved a 110-person team of Pesa engineers, as well as subcontractor engineers and academics from Polish technical universities. The designs were inspired by foreign trains, the Bombardier Talent and Siemens Desiro.

=== Elf II ===
New technical requirements for manufactured trains in Poland led to the discontinuing of Elf I units in 2016, with new Elf IIs being designed to meet the new requirements, which also differed from their predecessors, the Elf Is. Silesian Railways was the first operator whom ordered the new Elf IIs, in October of the same year, at a price of around 206 million PLN, cheaper than Newag and Stadler's trains. The order consisted of one two-car unit, two three-car units, and 10 four-car units. In 2017, an additional order of six more trains came through, which consisted of one three-car unit, two four-car units, and three two-car units.

=== Elf.eu ===
In 2019, Pesa designed the Elf.eu series, adapted to the requirements of train operators outside of Poland. Based on the Elf II series, Elf.eu are dual-voltage trains at 3 kV DC and 25 kV AC. The trains can also be configured from 2 to 5 cars. In April 2019, Pesa received 19 million PLN in funding from the Poland National Centre for Research and Development (NCRD), for the development of the Elf.eu series as part of the "Fast Track" competition for large train manufacturers.

The first operator to order the Elf.eu series was the Czech operator RegioJet, which ordered dual-voltage, two-car units. The trains are longer units, with different bogies. The first units entered service on 14 August 2022.

=== Elf III ===
Pesa Regio160, also known as Elf III (sometimes written as Elf 3.0) was designed as a low-level DMU. On 26 February 2021, a framework agreement was signed with Pesa, providing for the delivery of 160 DMUs for Czech Railways, with an initial order for 33 units. By November 2023, a total of 106 two-car units had been ordered. Construction of the first units began in 2023, designated as ČSD Class 847.

=== Exhibits ===
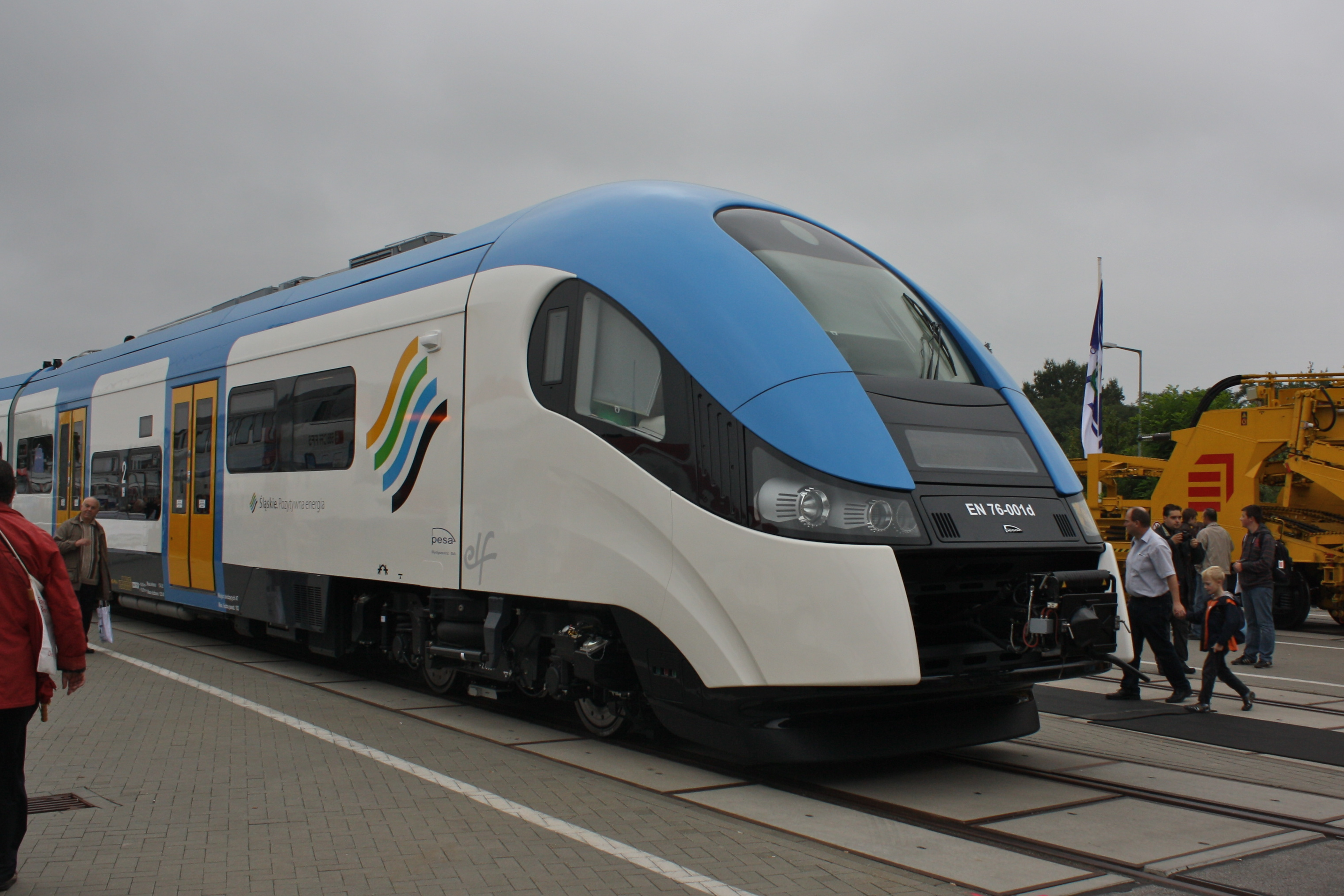
A Silesian Railways Elf I showcased at InnoTrans in September 2010

The Elf family was first showcased at InnoTrans (Berlin) on 21 September 2010. Pesa showcased a Silesian Railways Elf I EN76, numbered 001. The following year, in 2011, a Polregio (Holy Cross branch) Elf I EN96, numbered 002 was showcased at Trako (Gdańsk), between October 11 and 15. On 28 June 2012, during the presentation of the Pesa Link for České dráhy in Velim, Czech Republic, Pesa also showcased a Masovian Railways Elf I EN76, numbered 011. Between June 18 to 20 in 2013, a Greater Poland Railways Elf I EN76, numbered 035 was showcased at Czech Raildays (Ostrava). In the same year, from 24 to 27 September, a 3 car Elf I EN62, numbered 001 was presented at Trako (Gdańsk).

In September 2017, an Elf II 21WEa, numbered 002 was showcased at Trako (Gdańsk), followed by a 34WEa, numbered 003 at Czech Raildays (Ostrava) in June 2018. In September 2019, a Greater Poland Railways Elf II 48WE, numbered 004 was presented at Trako (Gdańsk).

== Features ==
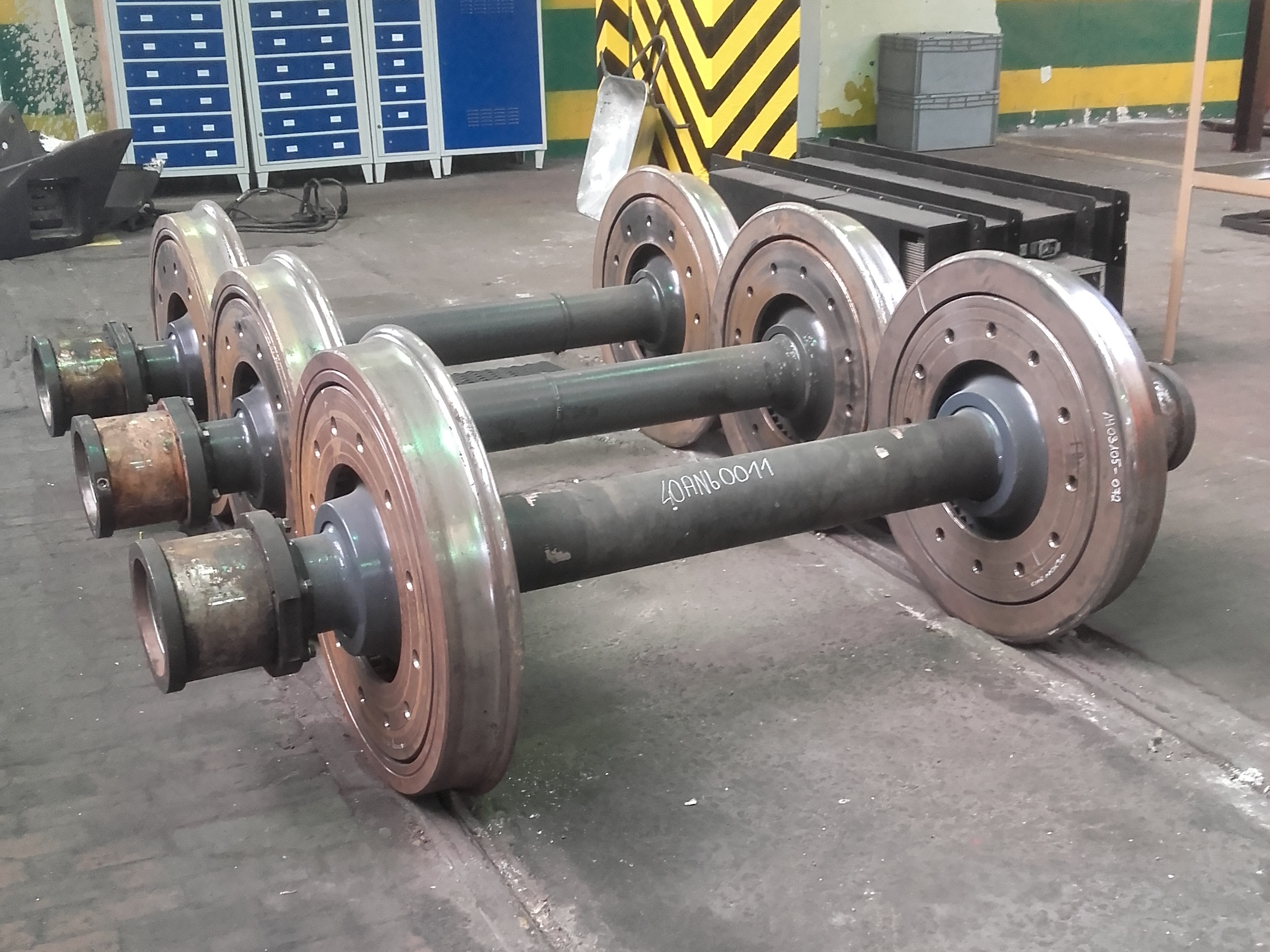
Set of wheels from an Elf unit

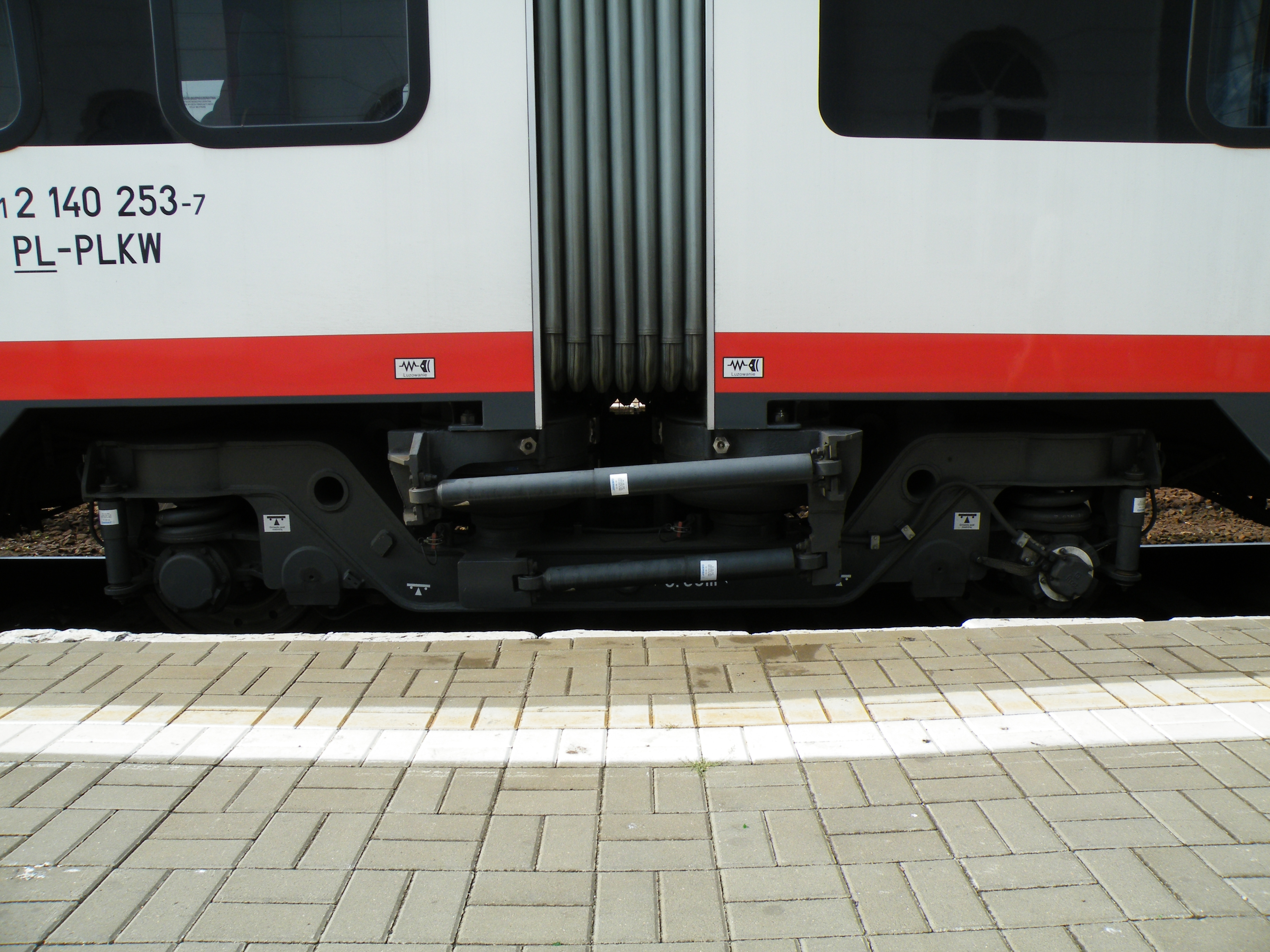
Jacobs bogies of a Greater Poland Railways unit

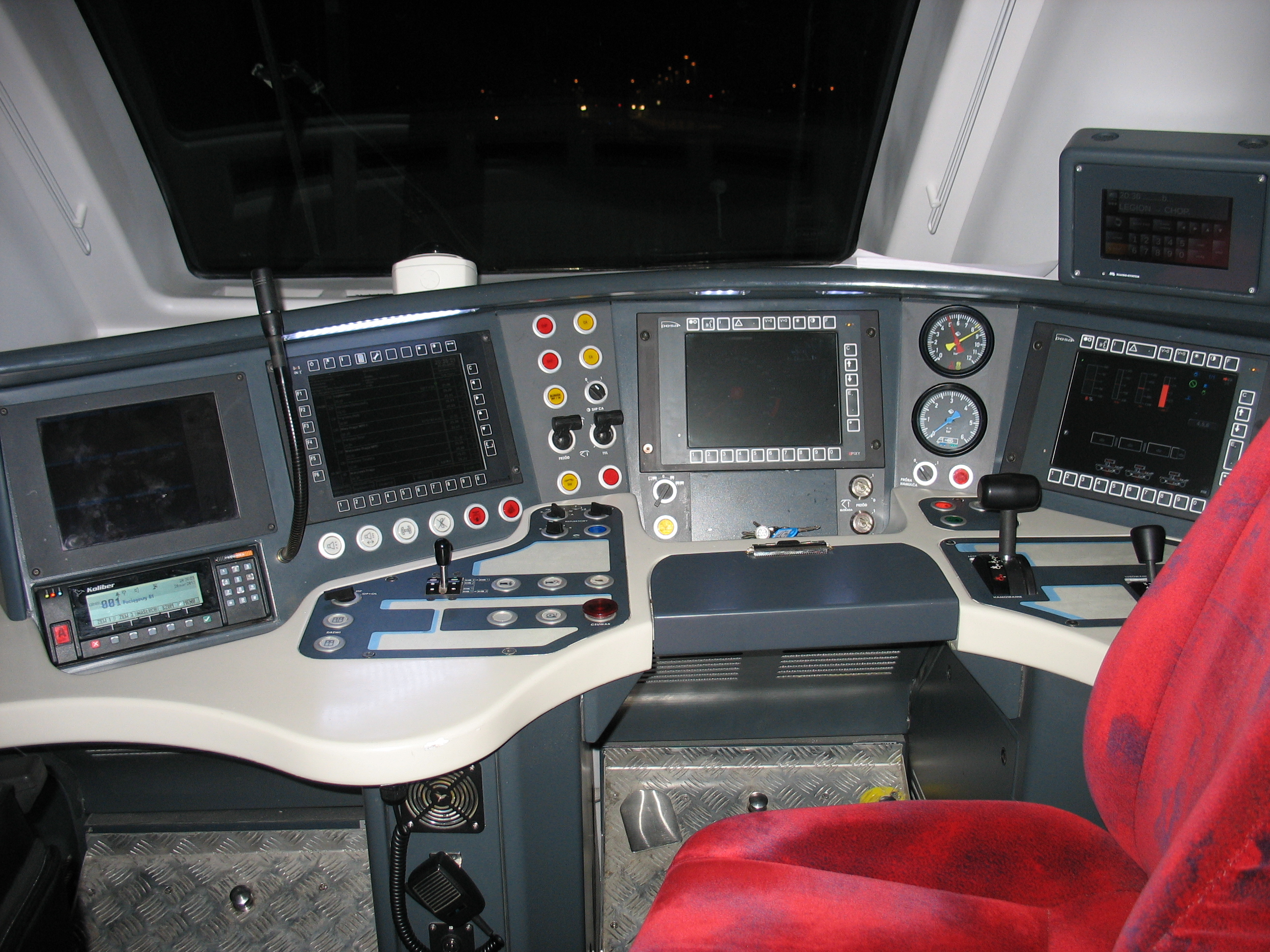
The driver's cab of a Rapid Urban Railway 27WE

The Elf family is standard-gauge, designed as low-floor trains featuring open gangways and plug doors. The trains are designed for multi-transport use, such as regional, commuter, and long distance services. Depending on their intended use, units vary in terms of acceleration, number of cars, and number of doors. For example, Elfs built until 2013 comprised of 2, 3, 4, or 6 cars, whilst the number of doors ranged from 1 to 3 per side of every car. The top speed of most units is 160 km/h (100 mph), however the top-tier version can operate at a top speed of 190 km/h (120 mph), featuring 10 cars. The exterior profile and interiors were designed by Bartosz Piotrowski. Pesa also offers broad-gauge Elfs, however such trains have never been built.

=== Traction, bogies, coupling, and suspension ===
In most units, only the front and rear (outer) bogies are powered, totalling to four traction motors for every train. Whilst the bogies in between carriages (Jacobs bogie) are unpowered, acting as trailer cars. This configuration is applicable for units of up to 5 cars. The Elf I 22WE and 22WEb trains operated by Silesian Railways are an exception to this, as all bogies are powered.

The bogies feature a two-stage suspension system: the primary suspension system consists of steel springs, while the secondary suspension system utilises pneumatic springs, equipped with emergency springs. Air springs (two per powered bogie and four per Jacobs bogie) support the car bodies. To provide additional vibration damping, hydraulic dampers are vertically alongside the coil and air springs, at the pivot yoke (lateral), and longitudinally on the sides of the bogies, acting as yaw dampers.

Trains use the scharfenberg coupling system, allowing for multi-unit operation of up to three units. However, due to the method used of the open gangway connection, units themselves can not be shortened or lengthened.

=== Body ===
The body framework is constructed from corrosion-resistant steel, including the 1.5 mm (0.059 in) thick outer skin, which is also steel. The train's front and rear (outer) ends are made of composite materials. All passenger doors of the trains are equipped with automatically-retracting steps to assist boarding at platforms with a height distance from the train floor, typically lower than 550 mm (22 in) or taller than 760 mm (30 in).

=== Interior ===
The interior design, such as the colour scheme of trains varies depending on the operator, however all units feature the same basic design. All seats are arranged transversely, (facing towards the front or rear) either in a 2+1 or 2+2 layout. Trains feature an accessible bay for wheelchair users, and passengers with bicycles, and luggage racks above the seating. All trains, except the Elf Is operated by Rapid Urban Railway (Warsaw) are equipped toilets, which are also accessible. The driver's cab includes two seats, one for the driver and one for the assistant driver.

== Operation ==
Country	Operator	Series	Image	Variant	No. of cars	No. built	Year built	Notes / references
Poland	Lower Silesian Railways	Elf II		48WEc	5	45 (out of 55)	2022–present	
Poland	Lesser Poland Railways	Elf II		22WEh	4	4	2021	
Poland	Masovian Railways	Elf I		22WEe	4	16	2011	
Poland	Silesian Railways	Elf I		22WE	4	8	2011	
Poland	Silesian Railways	Elf I		22WEb	4	1	2011	
Poland	Silesian Railways	Elf I		27WEb	6	6	2013	
Poland	Silesian Railways	Elf II		34WEag	2	4	2017–2020	
Poland	Silesian Railways	Elf II		21WEag	3	5	2017–2020	
Poland	Silesian Railways	Elf II		22WEdg	4	12	2017–2020	
Poland	Greater Poland Railways	Elf I		22WEa	4	22	2012–2014	
Poland	Greater Poland Railways	Elf II		48WE	5	10	2019	
Poland	Greater Poland Railways	Elf II		48WEb	5	5	2020–2021	
Poland	Greater Poland Railways	Elf II		48WEd	5	4	2025	
Poland	Polregio	Elf I		22WEc	4	6	2014–2016	Owned by Kuyavian–Pomeranian Voivodeship
Poland	Polregio	Elf II		34WE	2	4	2018	
Poland	Polregio	Elf II		21WEb	3	5	2017–2018	Owned by Subcarpathian Voivodeship
Poland	Polregio	Elf II		22WEf	4	2	2018	Owned by Subcarpathian Voivodeship
Poland	Polregio	Elf I		34WE	2	4	2011	Owned by Świętokrzyskie Voivodeship
Poland	Polregio	Elf I		21WE	3	1	2012	Owned by Warmian–Masurian Voivodeship
Poland	Rapid Urban Railway	Elf I		27WE	6	13	2011	

=== Poland ===
==== Silesian Railways ====
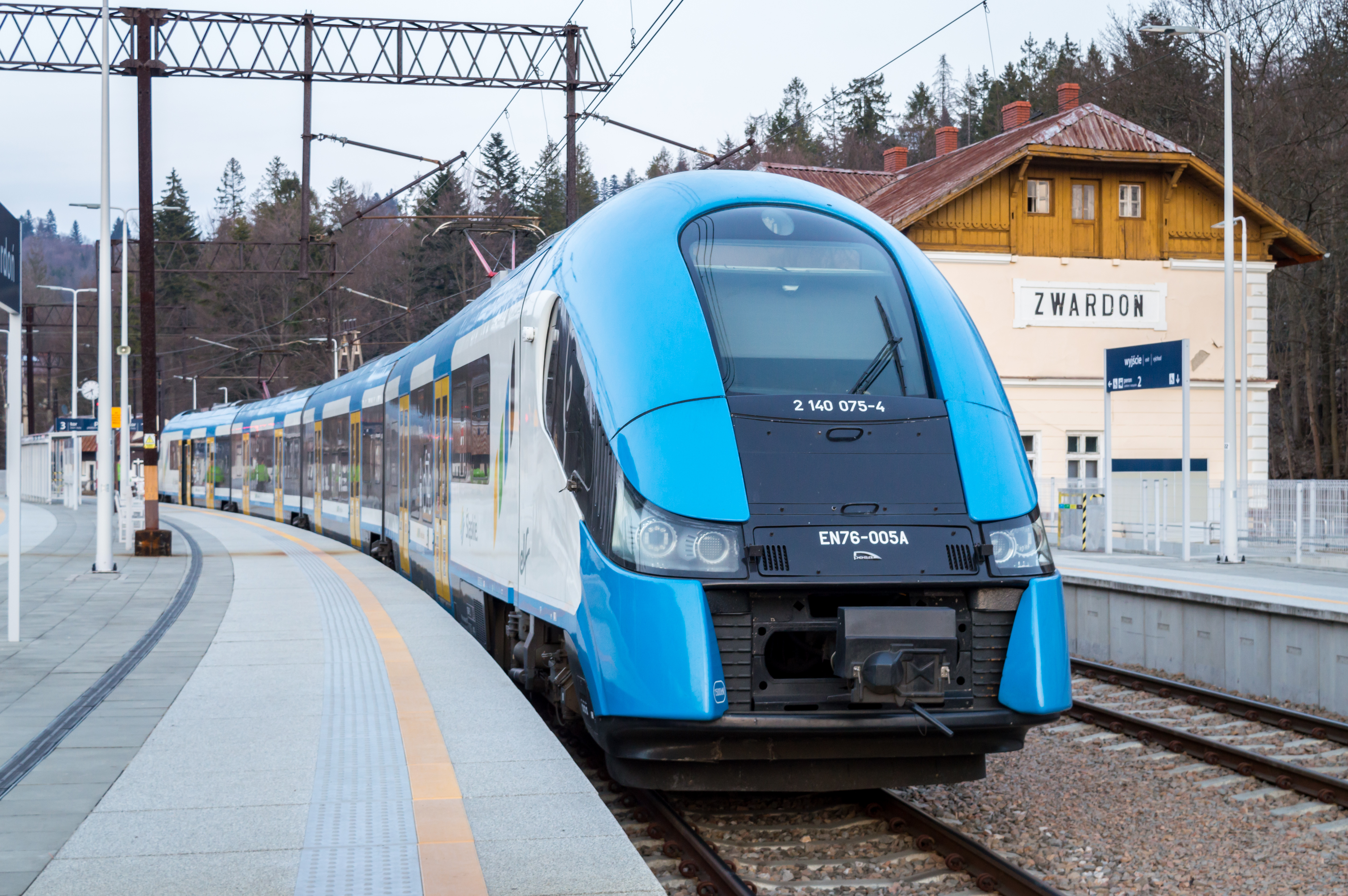
Elf I 22WE of Silesian Railways is the oldest variant of the family.

On 22 December 2009, the Silesian Voivodeship signed a contract with Pesa for the construction of eight 4 car Elf trains, followed by the contract for a ninth unit on 30 March 2011. Initially, the trains were intended to serve Polregio, however, with the establishment of Silesian Railways (KŚ) in 2010, the units were transferred to the operator. In early 2011, it emerged that the trains ordered were some 6.5 tonnes heavier than specified in the earlier contract. Consequently, Pesa removed equipment and altered features of the train: luggage racks were replaced with metal ones, seats were changed, and features such as additional sanders, larger water tanks, and glass breakers were removed.

The first two units were delivered in April 2011, initially stabled at two different depots in Katowice and Łazy until KŚ commenced passenger services on 1 October of the same year, when the new trains entered service initially on KŚ routes S1 (Częstochowa–Gliwice) and S6 (Częstochowa–Wisła Głębce).

On 10 September 2012, another contract was signed for the leasing of six 27WEb 6 car trains, with the option to purchase the trains at the end of the lease term. Initial technical inspection procedures by KŚ for the new trains began on 20 December, followed by further technical inspections (of the first two units) on 4 January 2013. Due to defects discovered during the procedures, the trains were not accepted by the operator. After four out of six of the units passed the technical inspections in late January 2013, they were delivered to Silesia on 1 February, with one of the units being showcased at Katowice the following day. The four units entered service on 4 February, with the remaining two units being delivered on 28 February, entering service on 8 March.

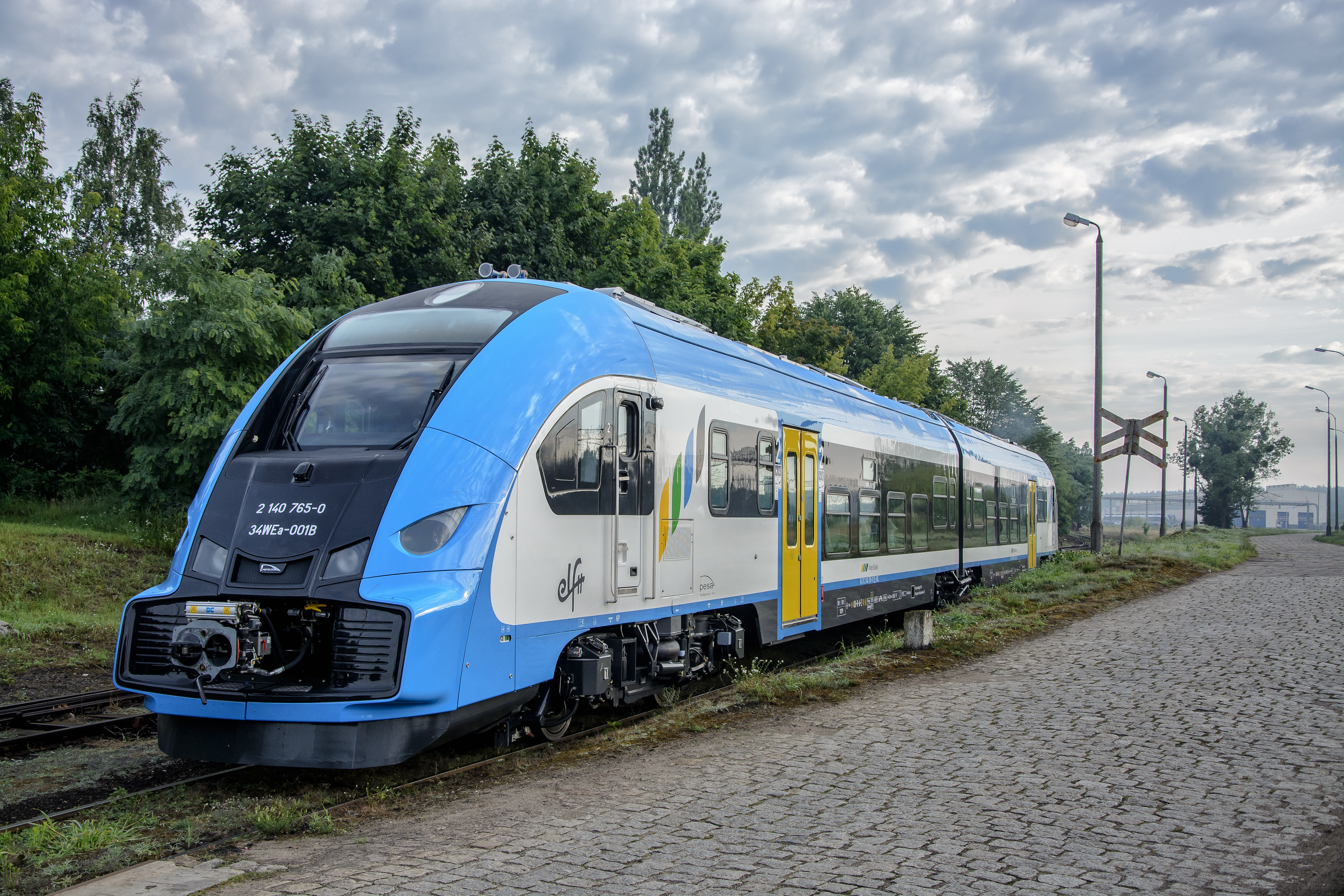
Brand new Elf II 34WEa at the Pesa factory in Bydgoszcz in 2017

On 18 October 2016, the Silesian Voivodeship signed a contract with Pesa for the construction of 13 Elf II trains, the first of the class. This included ten four-car units, two three-car units, and one two-car unit for KŚ. The contact included an option for the additional order of six trains. In late 2016, the operator decided to order four more units; three two-car units and one three-car unit. On 31 January 2017, the Silesian Voivodeship ordered an additional two four-car units, submitting the formal order a week later. On 23 April 2017, the first three-car unit, 21WEa, numbered 001 completed a test run from Bydgoszcz to Warlubie, where it departed for Kraków that evening for homologation testing. The deadline for the delivery of the first unit was 31 July; however, due to incomplete homologation testing, Pesa delivered the 14WE, numbered 002, which temporarily served KŚ to facilitate existing timetables until the new Elf IIs arrived. A month later, Pesa delivered additional replacement trains (for the same reasons): a second 14WE train and two EN81 units. The first unit was delivered on 11 September, 21WEa-002 which came into service the following day, where the same unit was also presented the day after, on 13 September. In late October, Pesa delivered two Masovian Railways EN71KM units as replacements for two 4 car Elf II; by then, the operator already had three Elf II units in its fleet. On 1 December, Pesa was granted permission by the Office of Rail Transport to deliver the four-car units, 34WEag; the first units arrived by 4 December.

==== Rapid Urban Railway ====
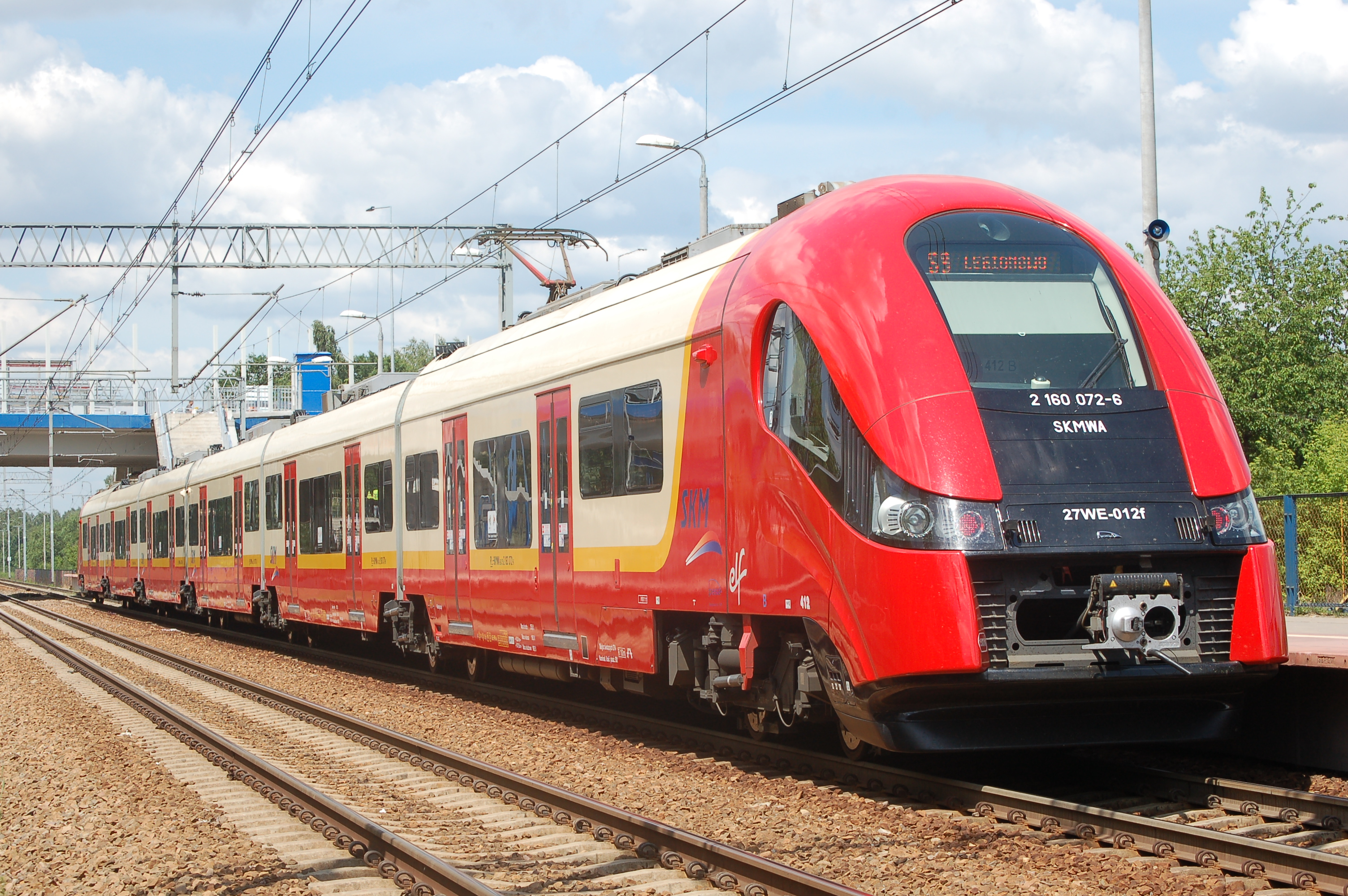
Elf I 27WE of Rapid Urban Railway at Warszawa Płudy in 2012

Warsaw's Rapid Urban Railway (SKM) consists of thirteen 4 car 27WE Elf Is, numbered 401–413. They were all ordered on 15 March 2010, to replace the leased class EN57 from the Tricity Rapid Urban Railway, whilst SKM had a shortage of rolling stock. In addition to the shortage, some services on the S9 line were covered by Masovian Railways. On 15 November 2010, SKM announced another tender for another six multiple units. Pesa once again proposed the Elf, however Newag won the contract with its Impuls family.

The first unit was delivered to the operator on 9 August 2011, working its first runs between Warszawa Wschodnia and Warszawa Zachodnia. Initially, the trains operated SKM lines S1, S2, and S9, and resolved the rolling stock shortage, with the leased EN57s being fully withdrawn from service on 24 September. On 20 April 2012, the Elf was the first train to arrive at Warsaw Chopin Airport during test runs in preparations for the station's opening, for 1 June. The trains were permanently assigned to the S2 and S3 lines part of European Union funding requirements, in which Warsaw Chopin Airport was the terminus of the lines.

On 23 June 2013, 27WE-009 was involved in a derailment over a set of points at Warsaw Chopin Airport. Three of the bogies and two cars were damaged. The train was subsequently repaired by Pesa, returning to service on 24 January 2014. The same unit was involved in rear-end collision on 10 February 2014 after it collided into a Masovian Railways EN57AKM-1623 near Warszawa Wesoła, injuring two. The front of the train was destroyed and was sent to Pesa for repairs in June of the same year.

On 21 May 2018, a contract worth 310.5 million PLN was signed for the construction of 13 Elf II trains, to be delivered by 2023. The contract consisted of eight 5 car units, and five 4 car units, with an option for an additional order of eight trains, which would consist of seven 5 car and one 4 car units. Pesa was scheduled to deliver the first 10 units by the end of 2019. SKM withdrew the contract in October 2019 when Pesa failed to meet the deadline of the delivery. At the time, one unit was built, which lacked homologation approval. It consequently underwent minor modifications to make it more versatile, after which it was presented at Wrocław Główny on 25 March 2021, as Pesa was seeking new buyers. Ultimately, the trains were sold to the Kuyavian–Pomeranian branch of Polregio, which were delivered on 25 November 2022.

==== Lower Silesian Railways ====
Elf II 48WEc of Lower Silesian Railways at Jelcz-Laskowice in 2026

On 9 September 2020, Lower Silesian Railways (KD) signed a contract with Pesa for the delivery of five Elf II 48WEc units, with the option for an additional order of another 20 units. KD ordered eight more units in March 2021, and ordered the remaining 12 units in March 2022, totalling the number of Elf IIs to 25. The first units were completed by the end of July 2022, with the first entering passenger services on 18 August serving routes D7/D70 between Wrocław Główny and Jelcz-Laskowice. Delivery of remaining units was completed in July 2024.

On 29 August 2024, another contract was signed with Pesa for the construction of 10 Elf II 48WEc units, at a cost of around €95 million. The contract also included the option to order an additional 10 units, which went ahead twice to 20 units in October 2025, totalling the future number of Elf trains on KD to 55. On 30 June 2026, KD announced that 12 units from the August 2024 contract had been delivered, totalling the number of Elfs on KD to 37; unit 064 was KD's one-hundredth train of its fleet, which subsequently received its own livery commemorating the achievement. By August 2026, 45 out of the 55 trains had been delivered to the operator.

==== Lesser Poland Railways ====
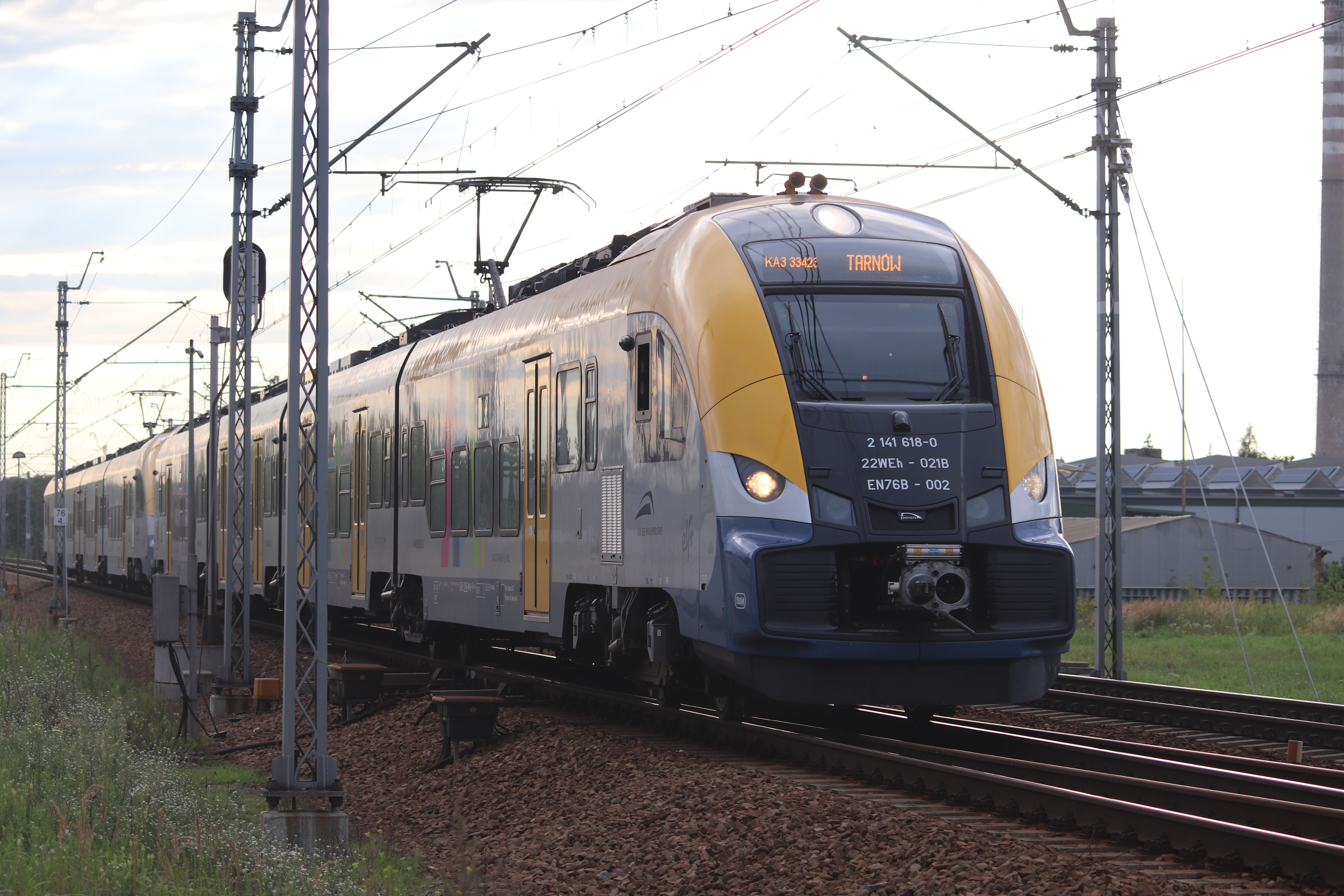
Elf II 22WEh of Lesser Poland Railways formed of units 002 and 001

On 28 October 2019, the Lesser Poland Voivodeship signed a contract with Pesa for the delivery of four Elf II 22WEh (EN76B) units to operate on Lesser Poland Railways. The first two units were delivered in August 2021, with the first entering service on 12 August. On 17 August, the new trains were presented by Pesa. On 27 August, the remaining two units were delivered.

=== Czech Republic ===
==== RegioJet ====
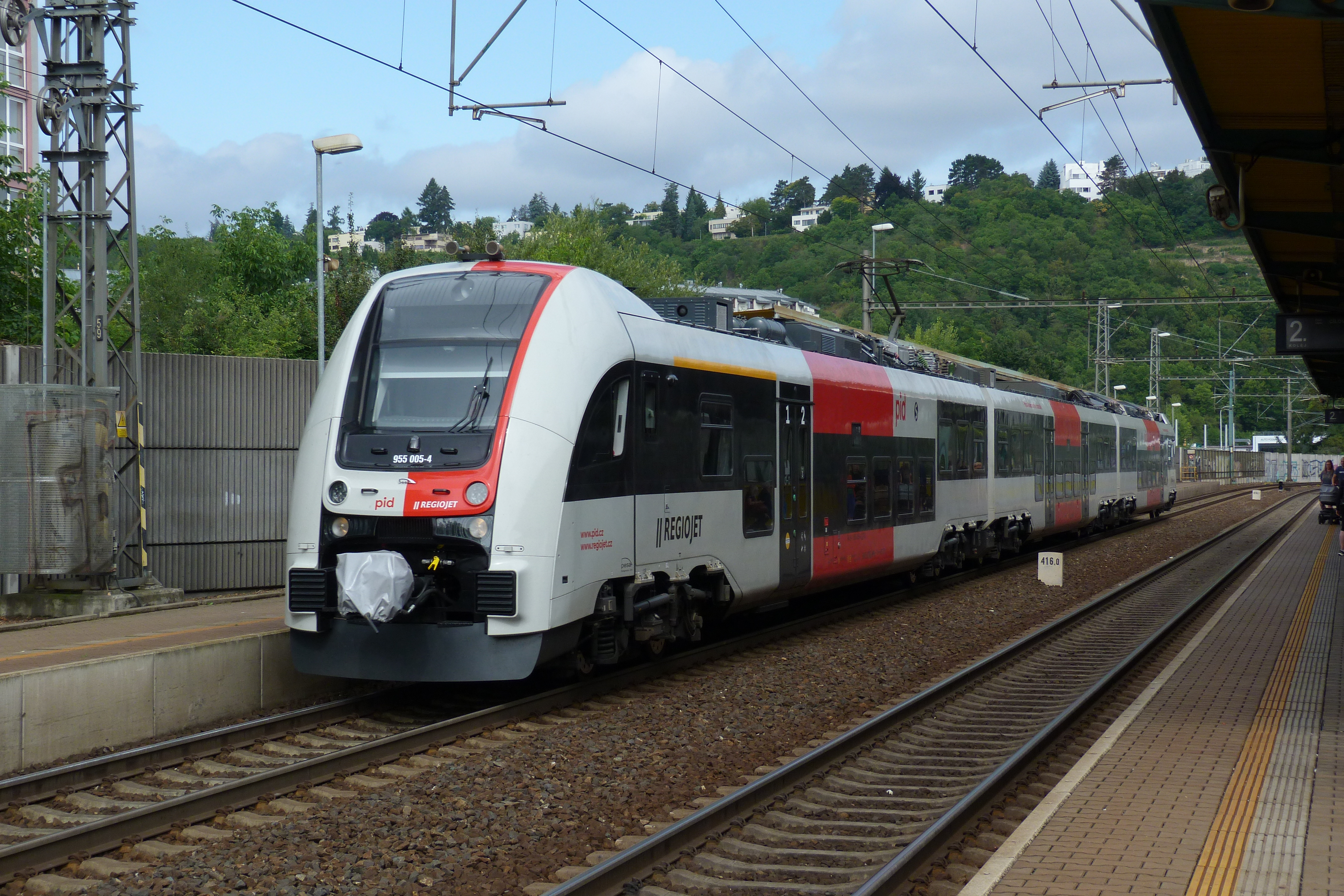
Elf.eu ČSD Class 655 of RegioJet at Praha-Podbaba in 2025

In March 2019, RegioJet signed a contract with Pesa for the delivery of seven two-car Elf.eu units for the Ústí nad Labem Region. These were the first Pesa Elf trains to serve places outside of Poland, and the first dual-voltage trains of the Elf series. The trains were designated as the ČSD Class 654, with the first three units entering service on 11 December 2022. The other two units were delivered in February 2023.

In November 2022, RegioJet signed another contract for the delivery of seven three-car Elf.eu units, designated as the ČSD Class 655. The trains entered service on 1 April 2025.

== Accidents and incidents ==
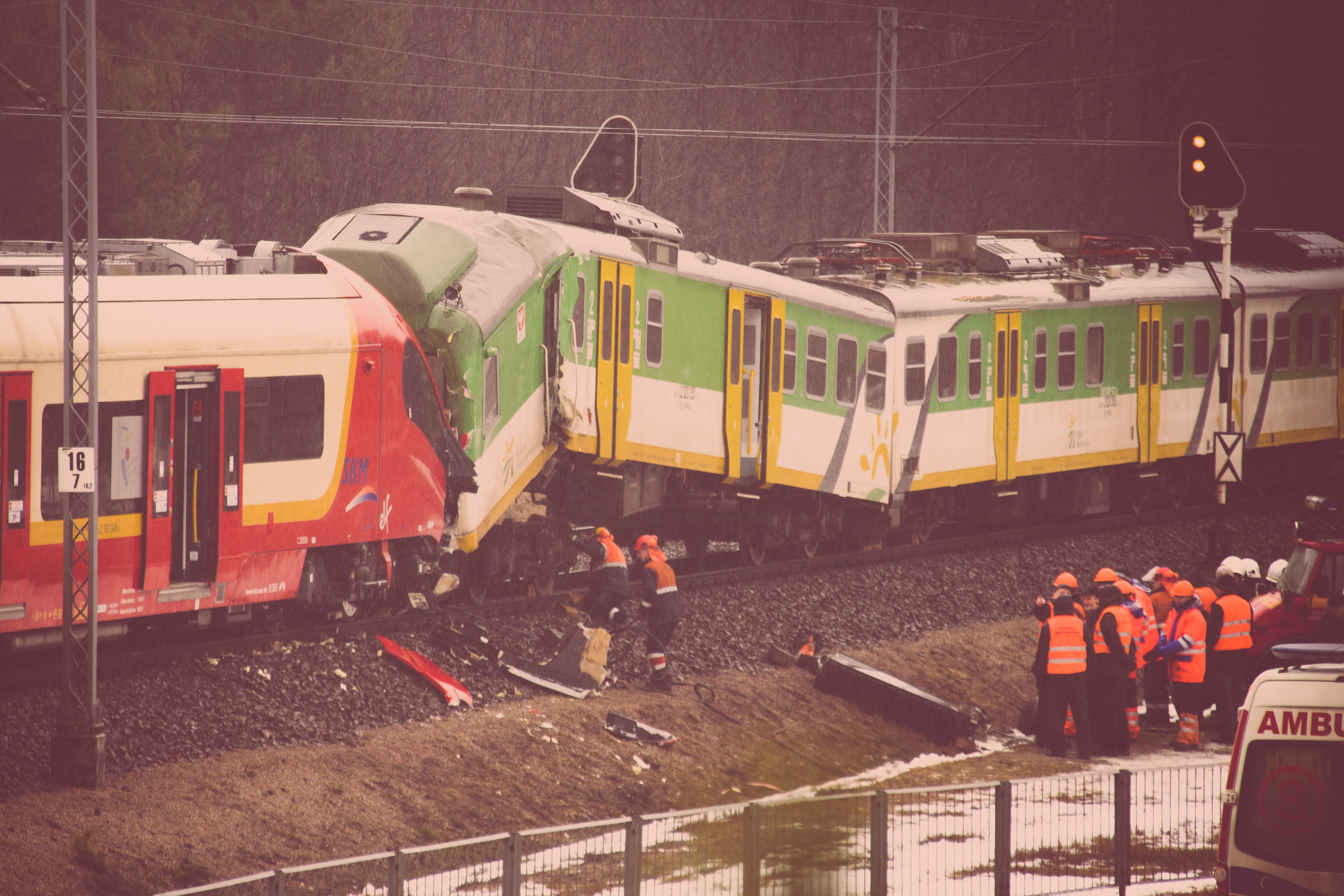
Aftermath of the 2014 collision, wrecked Elf train pictured on the left

- On 23 June 2013, at approximately 14:35, Warsaw Rapid Urban Railway (SKM) 27WE-009, derailed over a set of points in a tunnel after leaving Warsaw Chopin Airport railway station. It took one day to rerail the train, no one was injured. The cause of the derailment was human error, as the points were incorrectly switched whilst the train was running over them. The train was repaired by Pesa at a cost of 5 million PLN, and returned to service on 24 January 2014. The same unit was later involved in another accident near Sulejówek Miłosna railway station, two weeks after its repair.
- On 9 August 2013, Silesian Railways 22WE-004, caught fire after it had struck a fallen line of overhead wires that had been lying on the track, between Poraj and Korwinów. The driver's cab was completely destroyed as a result of the fire. The unit was sent to Pesa the following year for repairs.
- On 10 February 2014, at approximately 5:23 a.m., SKM 27WE-009, collided into a stationary Masovian Railways EN57AKM- 1623, near Sulejówek Miłosna railway station of the Warsaw–Terespol railway. Two people suffered minor injuries. The SKM train, operating from Warszawa Zachodnia, was the same unit that previously derailed in the tunnel after leaving Warsaw Chopin Airport railway station in June 2013, in which it returned into service just two weeks prior to the accident, after it was repaired at a cost of 5 million PLN. Regular services resumed at 15:50.
- 2026 Białośliwie train collision: on 25 June 2026, at approximately 18:04, a Polregio Elf I EN76KP collided head-on near Białośliwie railway station into the rear carriages of a PKP Intercity train, hauled by a Newag Griffin EU160. As a result, both the rear three carriages of the PKP Intercity and Polregio train derailed, injuring 11 passengers and crew, all of whom were on board the PKP Intercity train. Around 200 other passengers were evacuated. Significant disruption was caused to the Kutno–Piła railway after the incident.
