= Białośliwie =

- Village
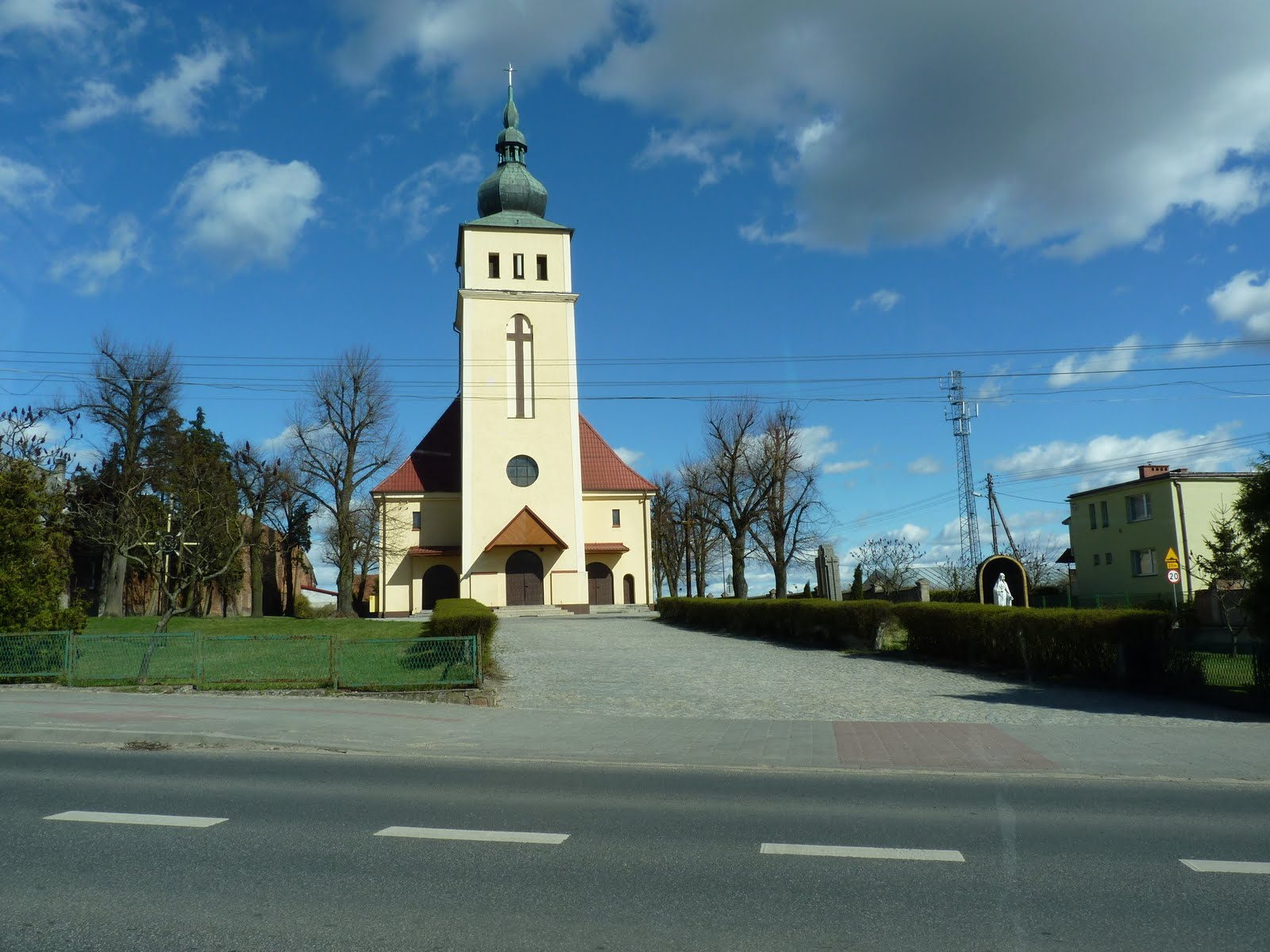
- Sacred Heart church in Białośliwie

- Location within Poland
- Coordinates: 53°6′N 17°8′E
- Country: Poland
- Voivodeship: Greater Poland
- County: Piła
- Gmina: Białośliwie
- First mentioned: 1216

Population
  - Total: 2,600
- Time zone: UTC+1 (CET)
  - Summer (DST): UTC+2 (CEST)

Białośliwie [bjawɔˈɕlivjɛ] is a village in Piła County, Greater Poland Voivodeship, in west-central Poland. It is the seat of the gmina (administrative district) called Gmina Białośliwie.

The oldest known mention of Białośliwie comes from 1216, when it was part of Piast-ruled Poland.

During the German occupation of Poland (World War II), in 1939, dozens of local Polish inhabitants were murdered by the Germans in mass executions carried out in Świerkówiec, Paterek and in the woods on the Noteć river.

The village has a pre-war Catholic church and two historic railway stations: Białośliwie railway station and Białośliwie Wąskotorowy railway station.
