= Białośliwie railway station =

Railway station in Białośliwie, west Poland

Białośliwie
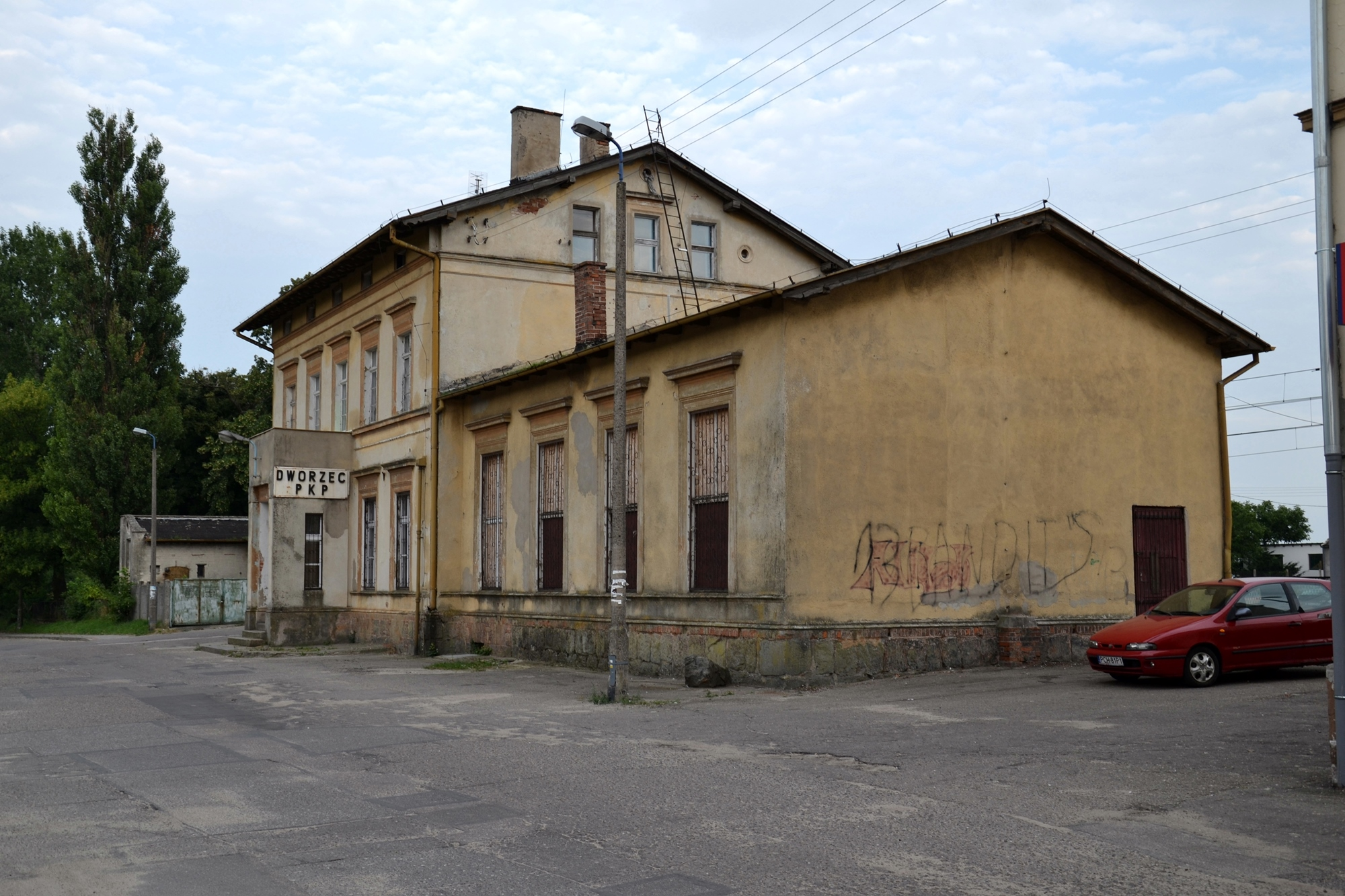
- Station building in 2013, prior to modernisations

General information
- Location: Białośliwie, Greater Poland Voivodeship; Poland
- Owner: Polish State Railways
- Line: Kutno–Piła railway
- Platforms: 3

History
- Opened: 27 July 1851
- Former names: Weißenhöhe (1851–1920); Białośliwie (1920–1939); Weißenhöhe (1939–1945)

Services
Preceding station	Polregio	Following station
Krostkowo towards Bydgoszcz Główna	PR	Miasteczko Krajeńskie towards Piła Główna
Location
- Location within Poland Location within Greater Poland Voivodeship

Białośliwie (German: Weißenhöhe) is a railway station in the village of Białośliwie, Piła County, within the Greater Poland Voivodeship in western Poland.

== History ==
The station was opened by Prussian State Railways on 27 July 1851 as Weißenhöhe. In 1920 it was renamed to its modern name, Białośliwie. During the Nazi occupation of Poland, the station was called Weißenhöhe. It was renamed back to its modern name in 1945.

The station building became culturally protected on 24 January 2007. In April 2025, newly modernised platforms were completed, at a cost of almost 10 million Polish złoty.

=== 2026 train collision ===
On 25 June 2026 at 18:04 CET, a Polregio train collided into the rear carriages of a PKP Intercity train, near the station. The Polregio train and the last three carriages of the PKP Intercity train derailed. 11 people suffered injuries. The two trains were rerailed on 27 June, with part of the line reopening on the same day.

== Train services ==
The station is served by the following services:

- Regional services (PR) Piła Główna - Bydgoszcz Główna
